= List of Archaeological Protected Monuments in Ratnapura District =

This is a list of Archaeological Protected Monuments in Ratnapura District, Sri Lanka.

Monument	Image	Location	Grama Niladhari Division	Divisional Secretary's Division	Registered	Description	Refs
Abayathilakarama Vihara		Panawenna	Kapuhenthota	Pelmadulla	23 February 2007	Image house with paintings, sculpture and rampart	
Ambagahawehera Mankada tope		No. 219 of the Ambagahawehera Mankada	Galpaya	Weligepola	30 December 2011	The old tope	
Ambanoluwa Raja Maha Vihara			No. 136D, Moragala	Eheliyagoda	30 December 2011	Drip-ledged cave temple	
Ammamuwa Kataragama Devalaya and Pattini Devalaya				Atakalampanna	30 July 1982	Rampart and throne	
Aramanapola Vihara		Ganegama		Pelmadulla	2 March 1951		
Aththalawatta Purana Vihara		Aththalawatta		Godakawela	22 November 2002	Buddhist shrine	
Aththarama Purana Vihara (Kolonne purana vihara)		Kolonna		Kolonna	6 July 2007	Buddha image	
Balawinna Purana Gangarama Vihara			Balawinna West	Godakawela	15 April 2016	Shrine with frescoes and sculptures	
Batatotalena Cave		Batatota		Kuruvita	27 July 2001		
Beligallena cave		Beligallenagama		Ratnapura	27 July 2001	Pre-Historic cave	
Bisokotuwa lake		Galpaya	Galpaya	Weligepola	6 June 2008	The bisocotuva lake with the stone sluice, bisocotuwa, ralapana retaining wall, the lake retaining wall	
Cemetery of Maduwanwala family		Dedarangamuwa	Maduwanwala	Kolonna	6 July 2007		
Dapane Sri Jayasundararama Raja Maha Vihara		Kolonna	No 210 Dapane	Kolonna	6 July 2007	Tampita vihara	
Dehigaskanda Mineral mine		Komarika	Miriswelpotha	Embilipitiya	23 February 2007		
Delgamuwa Raja Maha Vihara		Delgamuwa		Kuruvita	22 November 2002	Kurahan grinding stone, used to hide tooth relic of Buddha, shrine and library	
Devipahala Na Tree			Devipahala (GND No. 160A)	Kuruvita	7 June 2013	The historical Na Tree at Devipahala	
Dewalegawa Galkaduwa purana Len Vihara			Weralupe	Ratnapura	6 July 2007		
Dickwelegoda dagoda		Dickwelegoda	Maduwanwala	Kolonna	6 July 2007		
Diyavinna Devagiri Purana Gallen Vihara		Ganelandagama	Diyavinna	Balangoda	6 July 2007	Cave temple and two caves with drip-ledges in the premises	
Ehelepola Walawwa		Ratnapura town		Ratnapura	3 September 1999		
Ellawala Sri Gangarama Purana Vihara			No. 147B Deheragoda	Kiriella	30 December 2011	Old Image House	
Elugala Purana Tempita Vihara		Kanathiriyanwela		Imbulpe	22 November 2002	Tempita Vihara	
Ekneligoda Walawwa		Eknaligoda		Kuruvita	18 January 1974		
Ekneligoda Walawwa		Eknaligoda		Kuruvita	23 February 2007	Boundary wall bounded by Kuruvita-Erattna Highway, located in Ekneligoda Walawwa	
Galapatha Purana Vihara		Gangodagama, Palledenigoda		Weligepola	22 November 2002	Cave with Buddha statue, rock with inscriptions	
Gallengoda Raja Maha Vihara		Maragala		Godakawela	22 November 2002		
Galpoththawala Purana Vihara		Pelmadulla		Pelmadulla	22 November 2002	Image house with paintings	
Ganegoda Purana Vihara, Thiruwanakatiya		Thiruwanakatiya	Thiruwanakatiya	Ratnapura	6 June 2008	Buddhist shrine with sculpture and frescoes	
Gulana Cave			No. 194, Pimbura	Ayagama	30 December 2011	Cave situated in the land called Pimbura Veragamwatta	
Gurubalkada Bandara Cemetery		Eknaligoda		Kuruvita	23 February 2007	The Cemetery bounded in North-east by the land owned by the villages and reservation for the water tank of the town, South-East by reservation for the water tank of the town, South-East by reservation for the water tank and where the public cemetery is situated and South-West by the land inherited by Late J. K. Punchiappuhami, North-West by Kuruvita-erattna Highway	
Halmillaketiya Tope			Halmillaketiya	Embilipitiya	30 December 2011		
Halvinna Sri Jaya Maha Vihara			No 208 Kamburugamuwa	Kolonna	6 July 2007	Vihara Mandira	
Hargala ruins		Kewelagala		Weligepola	17 May 2013	The drip-ledged cave with brahmi inscriptions located in the mountain range adjoining the mountain range known as Hargala	
Hituwala Galge		Boltumbe-Sisiltonwatta		Imbulpe	8 July 2005		
Iddamalgoda Walawwa (Warigama Walawwa)		Battamgoda		Pelmadulla	8 July 2005	Tomb at Girawatte and Bodhi tree	
Ihalagalagama Gallen Raja Maha Vihara		Viharawela		Imbulpe	22 November 2002	Len vihara and two stupas	
Kande Purana Gallen Raja Maha Vihara		Kande Viharagama		Opanayaka	8 July 2005	Cave temple with drip-ledged caves and paintings and sculptures	
Kavantissa Raja Maha Vihara		Pallegama		Embilipitiya	22 November 2002	Stupa	
Kekula Kabara rock cave		Kekula		Elapattha	6 June 2008		
Kiriweldeniya Purana Vihara		Sannasgama	Sannasgama	Weligepola	24 July 2009	The front wall with the Makara Thorana in the Image House	
Kottimbulwala Len Vihara			Kottimbulwala	Weligepola	29 April 1977	Cave temple	
Kottimbulwala Len Vihara			Kottimbulwala	Weligepola	30 December 2011	The old hermitage in the premises of the cavern Rajamaha Vihara	
Kukuluwa Vihara		Batatota		Ayagama	27 July 2001	Pre-Historic cave in the Vihara premises	
Kuruvita Purana Vihara (Abhayathilakarathnaramaya)		Kuruwita		Kuruvita	22 November 2002	Stupa, Preaching hall, image house and paintings	
Lanka Pabbatha Gallen Raja Maha Vihara		Walipathyaaya	No. 260/B Walipathyaaya	Balangoda	30 December 2011	All the drip-ledged caverns with stone inscriptions in the premises	
Lendora Raja Maha Vihara		Belimaliyedda		Weligepola	22 November 2002		
Madarasinharama Vihara		Kandangamuwa	No. 136-A, Kandangamuwa	Eheliyagoda	6 June 2008	Buddhist shrine with paintings	
Maduwanwela Walawwa		Maduwanwela		Kolonna	20 September 1974		
Mahara Purana Vihara			No. 126, Mahara	Eheliyagoda	30 December 2011	Image house	
Maha Saman Devalaya		Dewalegama		Ratnapura	27 June 1952		
Maha Saman Devalaya		Dewalegama		Ratnapura	6 June 2008	The Alapatha Walawwe or official residence of the Basnayake Nilame and Buddhist shrine with paintings and sculptures of the Ratnapura Maha saman Dewala premises	
Makandura Maha Walawwa		Makandura	Makandura	Godakawela	12 June 2015	Bodhi Tree Terrace	
Makandura Purana Vihara			Makandura	Godakawela	6 July 2007	Image House with paintings and sculptures, Awasageya and boundary wall	
Manellena Cave		Batatota		Ayagama	27 July 2001	Pre-Historic cave	
Medabedda - Pallekanda Yaya ruins			Uggalkaltota Left bankLeft (GND No. 259)	Balangoda	17 May 2013	Stupa	
Meegahapola Purana Vihara		Meegahagoda		Pelmadulla	8 July 2005	Image house with paintings	
National gem and jewellery authority building		Ratnapura		Ratnapura	8 July 2005		
Nedun Raja Maha Vihara		Kiriella		Kiriella	22 November 2002	Buddhist shrine	
Nerawanalena Cave at Sri Sumana Gallen Vihara		Kukulegama		Kalawana	27 July 2001		
Niyandagala Purana Gallen Vihara		Pidaliganawa-Niyadagala		Imbulpe	8 July 2005		
Niyangama Udaha Walawwa			Niyangama (GND No. 236)	Godakawela	17 May 2013	The pre-historic tomb located in the territory	
Omalpe Tempita Vihara		Omalpe		Embilipitiya	22 November 2002		
Pothgul Raja Maha Len Vihara		Karangoda		Elapattha	22 November 2002	Two Len Vihara with paintings	
Puskada cave		Mahawalatenna		Weligepola	22 November 2002		
Ratnapura DIG office building		Ratnapura		Ratnapura	8 July 2005	Two storied building at old fort premises	
Ratnapura district court official residence		Ratnapura		Ratnapura	22 November 2002		
Ratnapura Dutch fort		Ratnapura		Ratnapura	22 November 2002		
Ratnapura Dutch fort		Ratnapura		Ratnapura	8 July 2005	Two Thorana	
Ratnapura guest house		Ratnapura		Ratnapura	22 November 2002		
Ratnapura library building		Ratnapura		Ratnapura	8 July 2005	At old fort premises	
Ratnapura Portuguese fort		Ratnapura		Ratnapura			
Ratnapura regional survey office building		Ratnapura		Ratnapura	8 July 2005		
Ratnapura SP office building		Ratnapura		Ratnapura	8 July 2005	Two storied building at fort premises	
Ratnapura SSP office building		Ratnapura		Ratnapura	8 July 2005	At old fort premises	
Ratnapura Traffic Police office building		Ratnapura		Ratnapura	8 July 2005	At old fort premises	
Saman Devalaya, Boltumbe		Boltumbe		Imbulpe	22 November 2002		
Sankhapala Raja Maha Vihara		Pallebedda		Embilipitiya	22 November 2002	Tomb of Pussadewa, the cave with drip ledges and other 15 caves	
Sri Chandrasekara Mudalindarama Purana Vihara		Mahawalathenna	Mahawalathenna	Balangoda	6 July 2007	Image House and Hewisimandapa	
Sri Mahinda Raja Maha Vihara		Godakawela		Kahawatta	1 November 1996	Image house with paintings	
Sri Rankoth Raja Maha Vihara		Gilimale		Ratnapura	22 November 2002	Image house with paintings and sculptures, Buddhist shrine	
Sri Sudharmarama Vihara, Pelmadulla		Pelmadulla town		Pelmadulla	6 June 2008	The Bhikku dwelling, the alms giving hall and the Dhamma discourse hall	
Sri Suwisuddharama Purana Vihara		Amitiyagoda	Amitiyagoda	Godakawela	6 June 2008	Buddhist shrine	
Sri Thaalarukkaaraama Vihara		Mullendiyaawala	Mullendiyaawala	Embilipitiya	30 December 2011	The old tope on the land Pin Haena	
St. Aloysius National school building			Ratnapura	Ratnapura	6 June 2008	Two-storey building belonging to St. Aloysius National School	
St. Anthony's Roman Catholic Church			Kanathiriyanwela	Imbulpe	24 July 2009	Church building	
St. Paul and Saint Peter Cathedral			Ratnapura	Ratnapura	6 June 2008	Church building	
Sudharmodaya Raja Maha Vihara		Pelmadulla		Pelmadulla	1 November 1996	Image house	
Sugatharama Vihara		Atawakwela		Balangoda	23 February 2007	Image house with Makarathorana and wall paintings	
The building bearing assessment number 1/1			Rathnapura Town	Ratnapura	6 July 2007	In Frank Hettiarachchi mawatha	
The building bearing assessment number 4			Rathnapura Town West	Ratnapura	6 July 2007	In Ratnapura Bandaranayake Mawatha	
The building bearing assessment number 58/1			Rathnapura Town	Ratnapura	6 July 2007	In Dutch fort premises	
Tomb of Iddamalgoda Basnayake Nilame		Pelmadulla		Pelmadulla	27 July 2001	The tomb at Girawatte land and Bodhi tree	
Udagama stupa			Udagama	Embilipitiya	17 May 2013		
Uggal Aluthnuwara Kataragama Devalaya		Aluthnuwara		Imbulpe	3 September 1999		
Veherabindayaya ruins		Biso Kotuwa	Galpaya	Weligepola	24 July 2009	Dagoba in ruins, building complex and premises with surrounding stone wall	
Veheragoda Purana Vihara		Atakalampanna Ambalanwatta		Kahawatta	22 November 2002	Dwelling house and the preaching hall	
Walalgoda Purana Tempita Vihara		Walalgoda		Embilipitiya	22 November 2002	Tempita Vihara	
Waldehi Katuwa Akuru Ketugala inscriptions		Kelambugaha Athura	Galpaya	Weligepola	6 June 2008	The inscriptions	
Waldehikotuwa Bodhighara		No. 219/B in the Galpaya-Bisokotuwa	Galpaya	Weligepola	30 December 2011		
Walipatha Puhulyaya Purana Vihara			Konegasmankada	Balangoda	6 July 2007	Cave with dripledges with Brahmee characters (Vidharshana cave temple)	
Wanawasa Pansala or Jayasumanarama Moola Maha Vihara			Thiruwanakatiya	Ratnapura	6 June 2008	Two-storey Dhamma discourse hall	
Wawlugala mountain		Alupatgala	Weragana	Godakawela	22 July 2011	Cave and hilltop containing pre-historic features	
Weheragodaella ruins		Rambukanagama D/3 cannel	Halmillaketiya	Embilipitiya	17 May 2013	Stupa	
Wehera Sindayaya ruins		Kanathiriyanwela	Kanathiriyanwela	Imbulpe	6 June 2008	Stone pathway, parapet and dagoba ruins	
Wijeyaratne Amitiyagoda Walauwa		Amitiyagoda	Amitiyagoda (No. 233B)	Godakawela	22 July 2011	Bodhi tree terrace	
