= Pathberiya Grama Niladhari Division =

Pathberiya
- Coordinates: 6.837128°N 80.326705°E
- Country: Sri Lanka
- Province: Sabaragamuwa Province
- District: Ratnapura District
- Divisional Secretariat: Eheliyagoda Divisional Secretariat
- Electoral District: Ratnapura Electoral District
- Polling Division: Eheliyagoda Polling Division

Population (2012)
  - Total: 3,088
- ISO 3166 code: LK-9103143

Pathberiya Grama Niladhari Division

Pathberiya Grama Niladhari Division is a Grama Niladhari Division of the Eheliyagoda Divisional Secretariat, of Ratnapura District, of Sabaragamuwa Province, Sri Lanka.

== Demographics ==
=== Ethnicity ===
Pathberiya by Ethnicity
1. Sinhalese (58.3%)
2. Sri Lankan Tamil (31.2%)
3. Indian Tamil (6.10%)
4. Moor (4.30%)
5. Malay (0.00%)
6. Burgher (0.00%)
7. Chetty (0.00%)
8. Bharatha (0.00%)
9. Others (0.00%)

=== Religion ===
Pathberiya by Religion
1. Buddhist (56.5%)
2. Hindu (26.4%)
3. Islam (5.00%)
4. Roman Catholic (6.60%)
5. Other Christian (5.60%)
6. Others (0.00%)
