= Karandana South Grama Niladhari Division =

Karandana South
- දකුණු කරඳන
- Coordinates: 6.78126°N 80.222552°E
- Country: Sri Lanka
- Province: Sabaragamuwa Province
- District: Ratnapura District
- Divisional Secretariat: Eheliyagoda Divisional Secretariat
- Electoral District: Ratnapura Electoral District
- Polling Division: Eheliyagoda Polling Division

Population (2012)
  - Total: 1,821
- ISO 3166 code: LK-9109051

Karandana South Grama Niladhari Division

Karandana South Grama Niladhari Division is a Grama Niladhari Division of the Eheliyagoda Divisional Secretariat of Ratnapura District, of Sabaragamuwa Province, Sri Lanka.

It remained a typical Sinhala Buddhist village until the 19th century. In addition to the original settlers, there has been some level of graphite mining during the British colonial period. Since the 19th century, many Sinhalese people have migrated from other areas for mining work, and the majority of the present villagers are descended from them. Also, with the spread of plantations from the late 19th century, a large number of Tamil Hindus also migrated.

An area with tea and rubber plantation as a primary economy. The village also consists of paddy fields and paddy farming is also done on a significant scale. Karandana Oya, a tributary of the Kalu Ganga, and the associated dola system are the main water sources of the village.

The main Buddhist religious center of the village is Karandana Sri Sanghikarama Maha Vihara. It was built by the village chiefs in 1870.

The name of Karandana became more and more famous as Karandana was the birthplace of a very famous Dharma preacher and a pioneer of Sri Lankan Buddhist revivalist movement, Karandana Sri Jinarathana Nayaka Thero (1875-1963) who was the chief incumbent of Thimbirigasayaya Ashokarama Buddhist Temple in Colombo. The Karandana Maha Vidyalaya was later named after Sri Jinarathana Nayaka Thero as a mark of respect.

Famous Native Doctor Nedurana Arachchige Yasarathne, popularly known as “Karandana Wedamahaththaya” in Waga (1980 – 1969) and writer and school principal Karandana Nedurana Arachchige Thigonis Gunadasa were two other personalities who brought fame to Karandana.

Karandana R/ Sri Jinarathana National School is the center of education in the village. This college, which started in 1888, is a school with a long history in Sabaragamuwa. It started as a boys' school during the British colonial era, which coincided with the revival movement of Buddhist education. The primary education headquarters is R/ Karadana Primary School . It also started in the year 1907 and has a history of more than a century.

== Demographics ==
=== Ethnicity ===
Karandana South by Ethnicity
1. Sinhalese (98.4%)
2. Sri Lankan Tamil (1.6%)
3. Indian Tamil (0%)
4. Moor (0%)
5. Malay (0%)
6. Burgher (0%)
7. Chetty (0%)
8. Bharatha (0%)
9. Others (0%)

=== Religion ===
Karandana South by Religion
1. Buddhist 98.4 (98.3%)
2. Hindu 1.4 (1.40%)
3. Islam 0 (0.00%)
4. Roman Catholic 0.2 (0.20%)
5. Other Christian 0.1 (0.10%)
6. Others 0 (0.00%)
