= Amuhenkanda Grama Niladhari Division =

Amuhenkanda
- Coordinates: 6.839662°N 80.291208°E
- Country: Sri Lanka
- Province: Western Province
- District: Ratnapura District
- Divisional Secretariat: Eheliyagoda Divisional Secretariat
- Electoral District: Ratnapura Electoral District
- Polling Division: Eheliyagoda Polling Division

Population (2012)
  - Total: 2,318
- ISO 3166 code: LK-9103141

Amuhenkanda Grama Niladhari Division

Amuhenkanda Grama Niladhari Division is a Grama Niladhari Division of the Eheliyagoda Divisional Secretariat, of Ratnapura District, of Sabaragamuwa Province, Sri Lanka.

== Demographics ==
=== Ethnicity ===
Amuhenkanda by Ethnicity
1. Sinhalese (72.5%)
2. Sri Lankan Tamil (3.7%)
3. Indian Tamil (2.6%)
4. Moor (21.2%)
5. Malay (0%)
6. Burgher (0%)
7. Chetty (0%)
8. Bharatha (0%)
9. Others (0%)

=== Religion ===
Amuhenkanda by Religion
1. Buddhist 71.9 (71.8%)
2. Hindu 5.7 (5.69%)
3. Islam 21.3 (21.3%)
4. Roman Catholic 0.3 (0.30%)
5. Other Christian 0.9 (0.90%)
6. Others 0 (0.00%)
