= Delgamuwa Raja Maha Vihara =

Buddhist temple in Kuruvita, Sri Lanka

- දෙල්ගමුව රජ මහා විහාරය
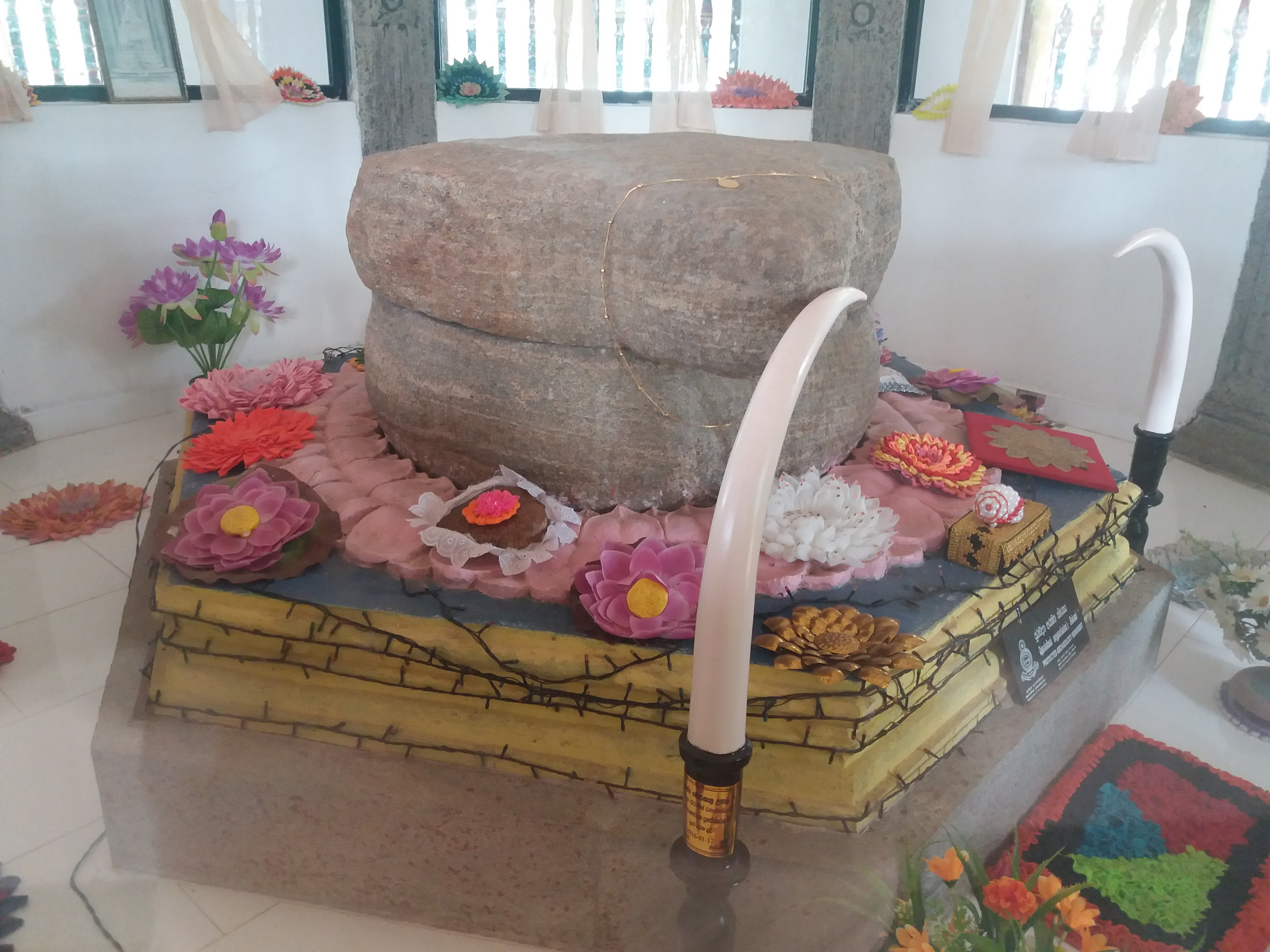
- The Kurahan grinding stone, which was used to hide the tooth relic of Buddha

Religion
- Affiliation: Buddhism
- District: Ratnapura
- Province: Sabaragamuwa Province

Location
- Location: Delgamuwa, Kuruwita, Sri Lanka
- Interactive map of Delgamuwa Raja Maha Vihara
- Coordinates: 06°46′33.1″N 80°21′22.8″E

Architecture
- Type: Buddhist temple

Delgamuwa Raja Maha Vihara (Sinhala: දෙල්ගමුව රජ මහා විහාරය) is an ancient Buddhist temple situated in Kuruvita of Ratnapura District, Sri Lanka. This temple is reputed as the hiding place of the tooth relic of Buddha during the ruling period of Portuguese in the country.

Currently this temple has been declared as one of the archaeological sites in Sri Lanka.

== History ==
The written history of Delgamuwa Vihara goes back to the time period of Sitawaka kingdom. During the past this temple was known as Saparagamu Vihara and Labujagama Viharaya as well.

With the arrival of the Portuguese in 1505 and the death of the King Bhuwanakabahu VII of Kotte Kingdom, a political turmoil was caused in the country. This was intensified with the conversion to Catholicism by King Don Juan Dharmapala. This incidence led the then Diyawadana Nilame Hiripitiye Divana Rala, who was the custodian of the tooth relic, to move the relic from Kotte Kingdom to King Mayadunne of Sitawaka (now Avissawella) for safe keeping in 1549. With the guidance of king Mayadunne the tooth relic was brought to Delgamuwa Vihara for further safekeeping, and kept it in a Kurahan (Eleusine coracana) grinding stone at the Vihara premises.

In 1592 Konappu Bandara, who conquered the throne of Kandy again, changed his name as Wimaladharmasuriya I and reclaimed the tooth relic from Delgamuwa vihara in Ratnapura to Kandy. He managed to build a separate two-storied palace to enshrine the tooth relic within the palace complex.

A few years after the removal of tooth relic, the temple was robbed and demolished by the Portuguese who constructed a fort there later.

== See also ==
- List of Archaeological Protected Monuments in Ratnapura District
