= Maduwanwela Walawwa =

- මඩුවන්වෙල වලව්ව
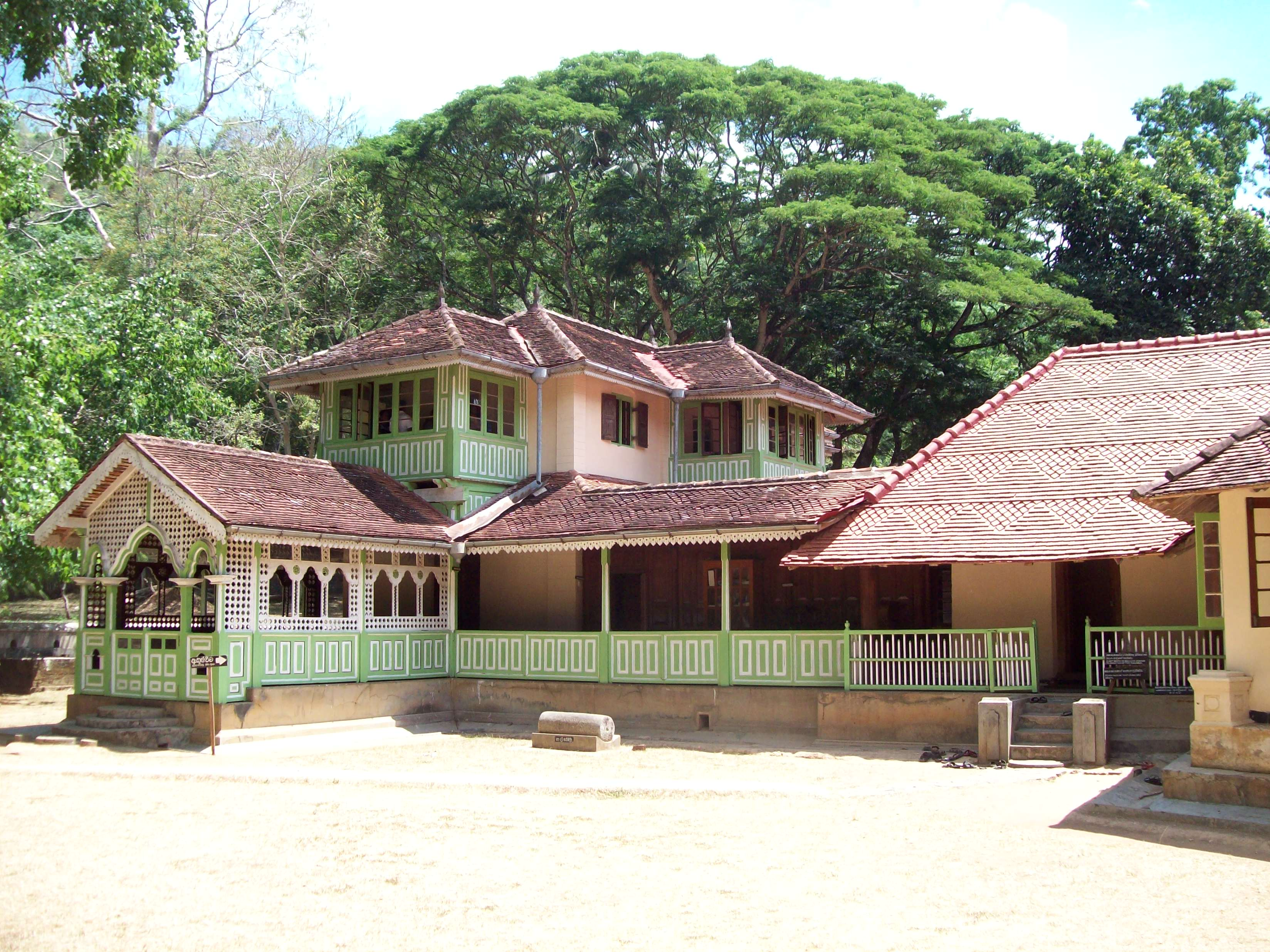
- Alternative names: Maduwanwela Mansion

General information
- Type: Walawwa
- Location: Maduwanwela
- Town or city: Kolonna
- Country: Sri Lanka
- Coordinates: 06°23′21.0″N 80°42′12.5″E
- Completed: 1725
- Owner: Department of Archaeology (Sri Lanka)
- Designations: Archaeological protected monument (20 September 1974)

Maduwanwela Walawwa is a walawwa located in Ratnapura District, Sabaragamuwa Province, Sri Lanka. The Walawwa is in the town of Maduwanwela, which lies between Embilipitiya and Rakwana, approximately 207 km (129 mi) from Colombo.

== History ==
Maduwanwela Walawwa dates back to the reign of King Vimaladharmasuriya II (1687-1707 AD). It was built by Maduwanwela Maha Mohottala in the 1700s and was expanded numerous times by the Maduwanwela family until 1905 when the final expansion was undertaken by Maduwanwela Maha Disawe.

== Building ==
Between 1877 and 1905, Maduwanwela Walawwa had 121 rooms, 21 inner courtyards (Meda Midula) and encompassed 32,000 hectares (80,000 acres) of surrounding land. Today, only 43 rooms remain. Within its grounds stands a courthouse with seating for 100 people, along with original furniture and punishment equipment still preserved. After the death of Maduwanwela Maha Disawe, the last of the Maduwanwela family, the walawwa was transferred to Sir Francis Molamure. In 1974, the Maduwanwela Walawwa and its estate, the Maduwanwela Nandigama Watte was taken over to the state by the Land Reform Commission and placed under the administration of the Department of Archaeology as a museum. In 2023, the Government of Sri Lanka leased 35 ha (87 acres) of the estate to Ceylon Tobacco Company for forest farming.
