= Kahawatta =

Kahawatta කහවත්ත
- Town
- Location within Sri Lanka
- Country: Sri Lanka
- Province: Sabaragamuwa
- District: Ratnapura

Area
  - Total: 4.563 km^{2} (1.762 sq mi)
- Elevation: 710 m (2,330 ft)

Population (2015)
  - Total: 1,101
- Time zone: UTC+5:30 (Sri Lanka Standard Time)
- Post Code(s): 70150
- Area code: 045

Kahawatta (Sinhala: කහවත්ත, Tamil: கஹவத்தா) is a town in the Ratnapura District, Sabaragamuwa Province, Sri Lanka. It is located in the central mountains of Sri Lanka at an elevation of 710 m (2,330 ft).

The town and its surrounding area is recognised for its large tea plantations and the gem industry. According to local folklore, the area was popular for providing turmeric to the Maha Saman Devalaya of Ratnapura. As a result, the area is known as Kahawatta, which means the "turmeric garden".

Religion in Kahawatta DS Division (2012)
1. Buddhist (76.4%)
2. Hindu (17.7%)
3. Muslim (3.40%)
4. Roman Catholic (1.60%)
5. Other Christian (0.90%)
6. Other (0.00%)

== Transport ==
Kahawatta is situated at the intersection of the Nonagama - Pelmadulla Road (A18) and the Watapotha - Opanayake Road, on the banks of the Wey Ganga. It is approximately 30 kilometres (19 mi) southeast of Ratnapura and approximately 100 kilometres (62 mi) southeast of Colombo.

== See also ==
- Karawwa
- Kahawatta Divisional Secretariat
