= Kalawana Central College (National School) =

- කලාවන මධ්‍ය මහා විද්‍යාලය

Location
- Kalawana; Sri Lanka
- Coordinates: 6°32′07.7″N 80°24′03.6″E

Information
- Type: National School
- Motto: සුනාථ ධාරෙත චරාථ ධමෙම
- Established: 4 June 1888; 137 years ago
- Staff: ~100
- Grades: 6 - 13
- Gender: Mixed
- Age: 11 to 19
- Enrollment: ~2,300
- Colours: Yellow & Green
- Song: Sinhala: "ශ්‍රී දේ දින දින දීප පූජිත කලවානේ මැදි විදුහල් මව්ණී"
- Website: https://www.kalawanaedu.net/kalawanans/

Kalawana Central College (Sinhala: කලවාන මධ්‍ය මහා විද්‍යාලය) or commonly known as Kalawana National School (Sinhala: කලාවන ජාතික පාසල) is a school situated in Kalawana, Ratnapura District, Sabaragamuwa Province, Sri Lanka. The school provides secondary education to boys and girls aged 11 to 19 and has a student population of over 2,000.

It was established on 4 June 1888, with 29 students and one temporary school building. The school was originally called Kalawana Swabhasha Misra Patashalawa. In 1958 it reached Maha Vidyalaya status and in 1979 Madya Maha Vidyalaya status. In 2012 there were over 2,300 students, 88 teachers and 28 permanent buildings.

Kalawana Central College was designated as a National School by the Sri Lankan Government in the mid 1990s.

== Notable alumni ==
- Prof. Dayananda Somasundara - Vice-chancellor Sabaragamuwa University (1995-2001)
- Thosapala Hewage - Ambassador to Nepal (2009-2012), Secretary - Ministry of Environment and Natural Resources (2001), Secretary - Ministry of Urban Development and Water Supply, Secretary - Ministry of Enterprise Development and Investment Promotion, Secretary - Ministry of Ports and Aviation, Chairman - LB Finance PLC (2013)
