= Ratnapura District Cricket Ground =

Cricket ground in Sri Lanka

Ratnapura District Cricket Ground is a cricket stadium in Monaravila, Ratnapura District, Sri Lanka. The ground was officially declared open on 30 March 2024 with the presence of Sri Lanka Cricket executive committee members, officials of the Ratnapura District Cricket Association and Uva Province Cricket Association, former Sri Lankan cricketer Sanath Jayasuriya, alongside current Sri Lankan national cricketers Pathum Nissanka and Wanindu Hasaranga. The stadium is built with an adequate capacity to host first-class games, under-19 cricket matches and domestic club matches. The ground project was financed by Sri Lanka Cricket through its National Development Pathway Programme.

== Development ==
Ratnapura District Cricket Ground's foundation was laid as part of Sri Lanka Cricket's program focusing on building ‘District Cricket Grounds’ with adequate infrastructure facilities, while also covering all 25 districts in Sri Lanka. The ground was inaugurated as the 11th district cricket ground by the Sri Lanka Cricket.

The construction work of the ground began on 26 February 2021. The first phase of the construction was speculated to end by around April 2021 and the first phase was proposed with the inclusion of facilities such as a play ground, turf, a well maintained drainage system and water tanks. Reportedly around 40 million rupees were allocated in the budget to cover the costs incurred during the first phase.

The second phase of the project was planned with a budget allocation of 350 million rupees and the second phase was proceeded with setting up of a pavilion, spectator stands and practice grounds. The ground was built with a proposal of including seven center turf wickets including five side turf wickets and two concrete wickets. The ground facility was developed as a tailor-made initiative for schools and clubs in the Ratnapura District and to cater to the requirements of schools and clubs in other areas of the Sabaragamuwa Province.
