= Hidallana =

Sri Lankan town

Coordinates: 6°43′N 80°23′E

Hidallana (Sinhala: හිදැල්ලන; also transcribed Hiddellana, Hidellana, Hidullena or in other ways) is a town in the Sabaragamuwa Province of Sri Lanka, located at latitude: 6°42'57.96", longitude: 80°22'46.2" near Ratnapura. The estimated mean elevation above sea level is 82 metres. The postal code is 70012.
