= Pelmadulla Divisional Secretariat =

- Divisional Secretariat
- Interactive map of Pelmadulla Divisional Secretariat
- Country: Sri Lanka
- Province: Sabaragamuwa Province
- District: Ratnapura District
- Time zone: UTC+5:30 (Sri Lanka Standard Time)

The Pelmadulla Divisional Secretariat is a divisional secretariat in the Ratnapura District of the Sabaragamuwa Province of Sri Lanka.

During the final period of the Kandy era, the Sabaragamuwa region was divided into six cantons:

- Kuruvita Korale
- Nawadun Korale
- Kolonna Korale
- Gravets and Center Korale
- Atakalan Korale
- Kukulu Korale

The Pelmadulla Divisional Secretariat belongs to the upper and middle parishes of Nawadun Korale.

It is located in the centre of the Ratnapura district. Compared with other divisional secretariats in the district, it is the twelfth largest by area. It spans about 14,674 hectares and covers 4.46% of the Rathnapura district or 0.22% of Sri Lanka.

Religion in Pelmadulla DS Division (2012)
1. Buddhist (85.3%)
2. Hindu (12.6%)
3. Muslim (0.70%)
4. Roman Catholic (0.80%)
5. Other Christian (0.50%)
6. Other (0.00%)

== Location ==
The province of Sabaragamuwa is located in south Sri Lanka.

The boundaries of the Pelmadulla Divisional Secretariat are:

	Divisional Secretariat	Grama Niladhari ("Village Officer")	
North	Ratnapura	Hettikanda	Egoda Malwala
		Banagoda	Kolandagala
		Heen Berenduwa	Angammana
		Batugedara	Galabada
		Durekkanda	Mudduwa
West	Ratnapura	Ethoya	
	Elapatha	Hangamuwa	Magurugoda
South	Nivithigala	Horangala	Pathakada
		Dombagammana	Erabadda
		Kiribathgala	Noragalla
		Wanniyawaththa	
	Kahawaththa	Nugawela West	Yainna
		Nugawela East	
	Godakawela	Kotakethana	
East	Opanayake	Polwaththahena	Hallina

== History ==
P.E.P Deraniyagala discovered remains of homo sapiens balangodensis (Balangoda Man) in Bulathwatta, providing evidence that the region of the present-day Pelmadulla secretariat has been inhabited since prehistoric times. A number of huts were also unearthed, originally built to provide shelter for ancient carters. This gave rise to the name 'Pelmadulla' for the area, meaning cluster of huts in Sinhalese.

The temple on the Denawaka and Kehelbaddala river basin was called Dronawakka Viharaya during the reign of King Vijayabahu I. The Nampotha (a book written in the Kandy period about important Buddhist centres) mentions this temple in its 203rd entry as Denawaka Viharaya, now known as Aramanapola Raja Maha Vihara. This latest renaming is credited to monks who arrived from Arammanadesh in Myanmar. The Pelmadulla divisional secretariat was established according to the sixth chapter of the Boundary Determination Act (no 22/1955) which was issued in 1955, as an assistant government agent division. Since then, the region has seen a marked increase in Grama Niladhari divisions:

Year	Number of Grama Niladhari ("Village Officer") Divisions
1955	10
1974	12
1985	18
1990	37

Under the Gamsabha administration, the Pelmadulla divisional secretariat was administrated under 3 Gam Karya Sabhas (staff council) and one semi-urban council. They were:

- Pelmadulla semi-urban council
- Pelmadulla Gam karya sabha
- Pathakada Gam karya sabha
- Marapana Gam karya sabha

According to Act no. 58/1992, the Pelmadulla divisional secretariat's office was installed in 1992.

Currently, the Pelmadulla Divisional Secretariat area is locally administrated by the Pelmadulla Pradeshiya Sabha (Divisional Council).

=== Ancient places ===
- Pelmadulla Rajamaha Viharaya
- Ganegama Aramunupola Viharaya
- Girawatta memorial
- Galpoththawala Sri Pada Viharaya
- Meegahagoda Viharaya

== Physical features ==
The Pelmadulla division can be divided into four main zones:

- Kuttapitiya mountain range
- Kiribathgala mountain range
- Denawaka valley
- Way valley

=== Kuttapitiya mountain range ===
This zone is located in the northern area of the division. The Kuttapitiya mountain (969 m) is the highest in the range, where the Kirindi Ella waterfall is also found.

=== Kiribathgala mountain range ===
This zone is located in the southern area of the division. The Kiribathgala Mountain (948m) is the highest in the range, where the Pulun Ella waterfall is also found.

=== Denawaka valley ===
The Denawaka rivers flow in the valley between Kuttapitiya and Kiribathgala mountain ranges. This zone is the most populous.

=== Way valley ===
The Way river flows in the southern boundary of the division.

==== Drainage ====
The main rivers in the division

- Denawaka river
- Way river
- Hangamu river

==== Waterfalls ====
- Kirindi Ella (116 m)
- Pulun Ella (105 m)
- Gerandi Ella (105 m)
- Rajana Ella (67.5 m)
- Lihini Ella (30 m)
- Kuda Ella (30 m)
- Hathbili Ella (11 m)
- Marakkala Ella (10.5 m)
- Ballan Damana Ella
