= Abhayathilakarathnaramaya =

- අභයතිලකාරත්නරාමය
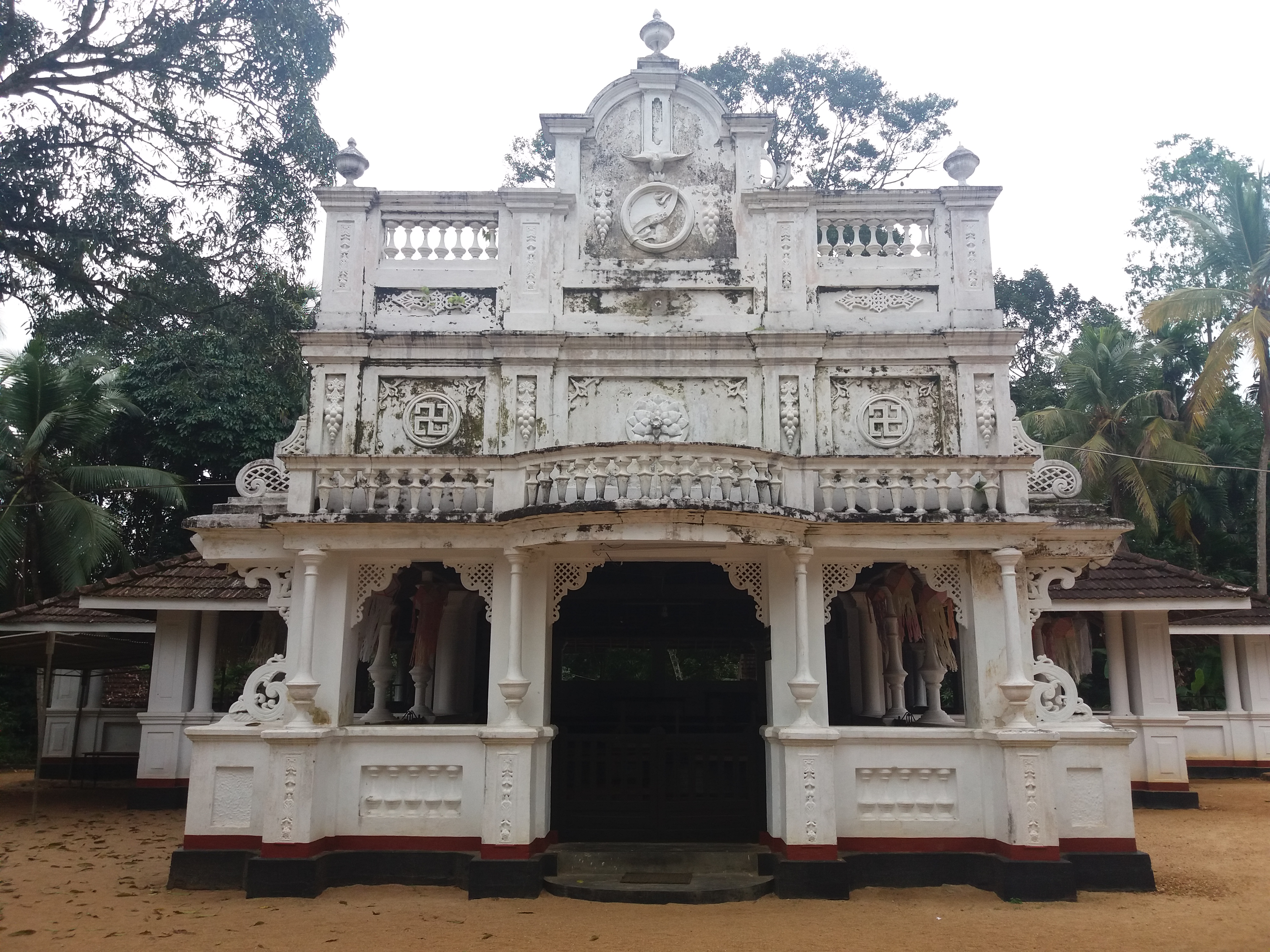
- The ancient Preaching hall at the Vihara

Religion
- Affiliation: Buddhism
- District: Ratnapura
- Province: Sabaragamuwa Province

Location
- Location: Kuruwita, Sri Lanka
- Interactive map of Abhayathilakarathnaramaya
- Coordinates: 06°46′41.2″N 80°22′00.4″E

Architecture
- Type: Buddhist Temple

Abhayathilakarathnaramaya (Sinhalaː අභයතිලකාරත්නරාමය) (or Kuruvita Purana Vihara) is an ancient Buddhist temple in Kuruwita, Sri Lanka. The temple is located on Kuruwita - Erathna road, approximately 150m from Colombo - Batticaloa highway. The temple has been formally recognized by the Government as an archaeological site in Sri Lanka.

== See also ==
- List of Archaeological Protected Monuments in Sri Lanka
