= Bopath Ella Falls =

Waterfall in Sri Lanka

Bopath Ella
- Bopath Ella
- Interactive map of Bopath Ella
- Location: Ratnapura, Sri Lanka
- Coordinates: 6°48′N 80°22′E
- Total height: 30 metres (98 ft)
- Watercourse: Kuru Ganga

Bopath Ella (Sinhala: බෝපත් ඇල්ල) is a waterfall situated in the Ratnapura District of Sri Lanka. It has a shape very similar to the leaf of the Sacred fig or "Bo" (බෝ) tree, which has earned it this name. The waterfall is a major tourist attraction in the country. Local myths say that it is haunted and that it hides a treasure trove.

== Location ==
Bopath Ella is located in a village named Agalwatte in Kuruwita in the Ratnapura District of Sri Lanka.

== Waterfall ==
The name "Bopath Ella" has been given to the waterfall because of its shape. The water flows through a narrow gap in the rocks and then widens, forming the shape of a leaf of a "Bo" tree which is the Sinhalese name for sacred fig (Ficus religiosa). "Path" means leaves of a tree and "Ella" means waterfall. Virgin forests with a rich biodiversity surround the waterfall.

Bopath Ella is 30 metres (98 ft) high. It is formed from the Kuru Ganga, which is a tributary of the Kalu Ganga. Its mean rate of flow is 6 square metres (65 ft^{2}) per second, and its catchment area receives an average rainfall of 5,080 millimetres (200 in) annually. Water from the falls is used for paddy cultivation. Bopath Ella is also the most comprehensively studied waterfall in the country.

Bopath Ella is a major tourist attraction in Sri Lanka, since it is not far from the capital, Colombo, and is easily accessible. There have been unsuccessful attempts to use the waterfall to generate hydroelectricity. The path to the waterfall is lined with a number of shops and stalls, and it is somewhat polluted because of this commercialization.

== Stories and myths ==
The waterfall has been used for bathing by ancient rulers of the country when they visited the nearby Maha Saman Devale in Ratnapura. It is also believed that the deity Saman has appeared here.

There are several myths associated with Bopath Ella. One such belief is that a local village girl jumped into the waterfall and killed herself when her lover abandoned her. He was reputedly a pilgrim from Colombo who failed to return to the pregnant girl. The girl's ghost is said to haunt the waterfall, and appears as a blue light. Another popular belief among the locals is that there is an ancient treasure trove hidden in the waterfall, and that one thousand human sacrifices are required to get it.

== See also ==
- List of waterfalls
- List of waterfalls of Sri Lanka
