= Karawwa =

Karawwa කරව්ව
- Village
- Location within Sri Lanka
- Coordinates: 7.249999°N 80.0666664°E
- Country: Sri Lanka
- Province: Sabaragamuwa Province
- District: Kahawatta
- Time zone: UTC+5:30 (Sri Lanka Standard Time)
- Sri Lanka Post: 61022
- Area code: 032

Karawwa is a village in the town of Kahawatta in Ratnapura District in Sri Lanka.

== Name ==
It was named after the herb "karaw" or Caraway.

== Geography ==
The area is surrounded by "Kahawathu kanda" (the mountain of Kahawatta) a small part of the Sabaragamu mountain range which is one of the main mountainous areas in Sri Lanka except the central hills in the middle of the island.

Wae ganga(wae rever) is flowing hiding thousands of precious stones in its territory and becoming a border to the area. It is a branch of Kalu ganga which is considered to be one of the four main rivers in Sri Lanka.

== Mining ==
Karawwa is one of the main areas where gem mining takes place. Most of the areas in Kahawatta town are damaged by gem mining. Because of the underground holes dug for gem mining the area is dangerous. One of the buildings of Kahawatta base hospital has already been submerged and is out of use. The area often suffers from landslides which may also be as a result of this underground cavities. Gem miners dig a basic pit of 10 to 15 feet in diameter until they find the strips of "illam" (the special stratum of soil, in which precious stones are liable to be found). As that is a stratum it exists horizontally, hence miners have to dig borrows called "dona" horizontally. After all the illams have been taken off the mine is refilled with soil, but donas remain and make the area dangerous.
