= Ekanite =

Phyllosilicate mineral

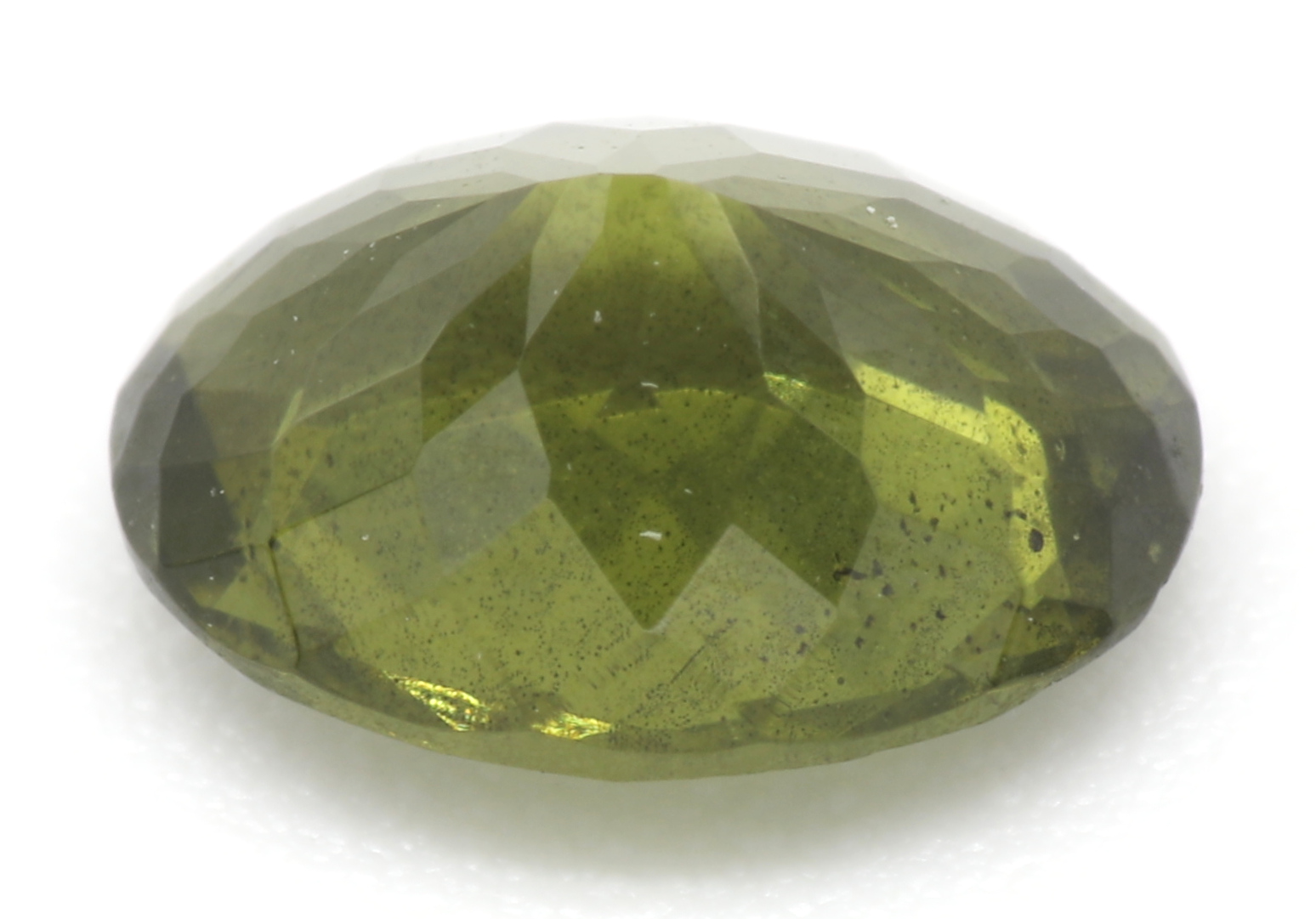
- A cut crystal of ekanite

General
- Category: Phyllosilicate minerals
- Formula: Ca_{2}ThSi_{8}O_{20} or (Ca,Fe,Pb)_{2}(Th,U)Si_{8}O_{20}
- IMA symbol: Ek
- Strunz classification: 9.EA.10
- Crystal system: Tetragonal
- Crystal class: Trapezohedral (422); H-M symbol: (4 2 2)
- Space group: I422

Identification
- Color: Green, yellow, dark red
- Crystal habit: Pyramidal crystals, granular to massive
- Cleavage: Distinct on {101}
- Fracture: Brittle, uneven
- Mohs scale hardness: 4.5
- Luster: Vitreous
- Streak: White
- Diaphaneity: Transparent to translucent
- Specific gravity: 2.95 – 3.28
- Optical properties: Uniaxial (−)
- Refractive index: n_{ω} = 1.580 n_{ε} = 1.568
- Birefringence: δ = 0.012
- 2V angle: 10 – 15°
- Other characteristics: Radioactive, metamict

Ekanite is an uncommon silicate mineral with chemical formula Ca_{2}ThSi_{8}O_{20} or (Ca,Fe,Pb)_{2}(Th,U)Si_{8}O_{20}. It is a member of the steacyite group. It is among the few gemstones that are naturally radioactive. Most ekanite is mined in Sri Lanka, although deposits also occur in Russia and North America. Clear and well-colored stones are rare as the radioactivity tends to degrade the crystal matrix over time in a process known as metamictization.

The type locality is Eheliyagoda, Ratnapura District, Sabaragamuwa Province, Sri Lanka, where it was first described in 1955 by F. L. D. Ekanayake, a Sri Lankan scientist, and it is named after him.

In Sri Lanka the mineral specimens occur as detrital pebbles. In the Tombstone Mountains of Yukon, Canada, the mineral is found in a syenitic glacial erratic boulder. In the Alban Hills of Italy it is found in volcanic ejecta.

Ekanite can be uranium-lead dated with ekanite from Okkampitiya in the Monaragala District of Sri Lanka being dated to around 560 million years old.
