= Pohorabawa =

Pohorabawa පොහොරබාව
- Village
- Location in Sri Lanka
- Coordinates: 6.4727°N 80.1843°E
- Country: Sri Lanka
- Province: Sabaragamuwa Province
- District: Ratnapura District
- Area code: 045

Pohorabawa is a village in the Ratnapura District in the Sabaragamuwa Province of Sri Lanka. It is divided into Ihala Pohorabawa and Pahala Pohorabawa. This village has a school, a post office, and a rural bank.
