= Elapattha Divisional Secretariat =

- Divisional Secretariat
- Interactive map of Elapattha Divisional Secretariat
- Country: Sri Lanka
- Province: Sabaragamuwa Province
- District: Ratnapura District
- Time zone: UTC+5:30 (Sri Lanka Standard Time)

Elapattha Divisional Secretariat is a Divisional Secretariat of Ratnapura District, of Sabaragamuwa Province, Sri Lanka.

Religion in Elapatha DS Division (2012)
1. Buddhist (94.1%)
2. Hindu (4.70%)
3. Muslim (0.30%)
4. Roman Catholic (0.80%)
5. Other Christian (0.20%)
6. Other (0.00%)
