= Kiriella Divisional Secretariat =

- Divisional Secretariat
- Interactive map of Kiriella Divisional Secretariat
- Country: Sri Lanka
- Province: Sabaragamuwa Province
- District: Ratnapura District
- Time zone: UTC+5:30 (Sri Lanka Standard Time)

Kiriella Divisional Secretariat is a Divisional Secretariat of Ratnapura District, of Sabaragamuwa Province, Sri Lanka.

Religion in Kiriella DS Division (2012)
1. Buddhist (96.3%)
2. Hindu (3.00%)
3. Muslim (0.00%)
4. Roman Catholic (0.50%)
5. Other Christian (0.20%)
6. Other (0.00%)
