= Balangoda Divisional Secretariat =

- Divisional Secretariat
- Interactive map of Balangoda Divisional Secretariat
- Country: Sri Lanka
- Province: Sabaragamuwa Province
- District: Ratnapura District
- Time zone: UTC+5:30 (Sri Lanka Standard Time)

Balangoda Divisional Secretariat is a Divisional Secretariat of Ratnapura District, of Sabaragamuwa Province, Sri Lanka.

Religion in Balangoda DS Division (2012)
1. Buddhist (77.5%)
2. Hindu (11.7%)
3. Muslim (7.60%)
4. Roman Catholic (2.20%)
5. Other Christian (1.00%)
6. Other (0.00%)
