= Ayagama Divisional Secretariat =

- Divisional Secretariat
- Location in Sri Lanka
- Coordinates: 6°38′54″N 80°17′58″E
- Country: Sri Lanka
- Province: Sabaragamuwa Province
- District: Ratnapura District
- Time zone: UTC+5:30 (Sri Lanka Standard Time)

Ayagama Divisional Secretariat is a Divisional Secretariat of Ratnapura District, of Sabaragamuwa Province, Sri Lanka.

Religion in Ayagama DS Division (2012)
1. Buddhist (86.2%)
2. Hindu (12.4%)
3. Muslim (0.10%)
4. Roman Catholic (0.40%)
5. Other Christian (0.90%)
6. Other (0.00%)
