= Godakawela Divisional Secretariat =

Coordinates: 6°30′5″N 80°37′54″E

Godakawela city
- city
- Interactive map of Godakawela city
- Country: Sri Lanka
- Province: Sabaragamuwa Province
- District: Ratnapura District
- Time zone: UTC+5:30 (Sri Lanka Standard Time)

Godakawela city is a City of Ratnapura District, of Sabaragamuwa Province, Sri Lanka.

Religion in Godakawela DS Division (2012)
1. Buddhist (77.3%)
2. Hindu (16.1%)
3. Muslim (3.80%)
4. Roman Catholic (1.80%)
5. Other Christian (1.10%)
6. Other (0.00%)
