= Opanayaka Divisional Secretariat =

- Divisional Secretariat
- Interactive map of Opanayaka Divisional Secretariat
- Country: Sri Lanka
- Province: Sabaragamuwa Province
- District: Ratnapura District
- Time zone: UTC+5:30 (Sri Lanka Standard Time)

Opanayaka Divisional Secretariat is a Divisional Secretariat of Ratnapura District, of Sabaragamuwa Province, Sri Lanka.

Religion in Opanayaka DS Division (2012)
1. Buddhist (91.3%)
2. Hindu (6.60%)
3. Muslim (1.00%)
4. Roman Catholic (0.50%)
5. Other Christian (0.60%)
6. Other (0.00%)
