= Gems of Sri Lanka =

Traditional Gem Fields of Sri Lanka

Sri Lanka’s gem industry has a very long and colorful history. Sri Lanka was affectionately known as Ratna-Dweepa which means Gem Island. The name is a reflection of its natural wealth. Marco Polo wrote that the island had the best sapphires, topazes, amethysts, and other gems in the world. Ptolemy, the 2nd century astronomer recorded that beryl and sapphire were the mainstay of Sri Lanka’s gem industry. Records from sailors that visited the island state that they brought back “jewels of Serendib”. Serendib was the ancient name given to the island by middle eastern and Persian traders that crossed the Indian Ocean to trade gems from Sri Lanka to the East during the 4th and 5th century. Often the historical word "Ceylon" is used within gem industries to denote stones that come from the island.

Sri Lanka, geologically speaking is an extremely old country. Ninety percent of the rocks of the island are of Precambrian age, 560 million to 2,400 million years ago. The gems form in sedimentary residual gem deposits, eluvial deposits, metamorphic deposits, skarn and calcium-rich rocks. Nearly all the gem formations in Sri Lanka are located in the central high-grade metamorphic terrain of the Highland Complex. The gem deposits are classified as sedimentary, metamorphic and magmatic; the sedimentary types being the most abundant. The mineralogy of the gem deposits varies widely with, among others, corundum (sapphire, ruby), chrysoberyl, beryl, spinel, topaz, zircon, tourmaline, garnet being common.

Timber-lined shaft of an artisanal gem pit near Pelmadulla, Ratnapura District

Residual deposits are mainly found in flood plains of rivers and streams. The metamorphic types of gems constitute 90% of the gem deposits in Sri Lanka. It has been estimated that nearly 25% of the total land area of Sri Lanka is potentially gem-bearing, making Sri Lanka one of the countries with the highest density of gem deposits compared to its landmass.

Ratnapura contains the most gem deposits and derived its name from the gem industry. Ratnapura means “city of gems”.
