= Uggal Aluthnuwara Kataragama Devalaya =

Ancient hindu place of worship

Uggal Aluthnuwara Kataragama Devalaya උග්ගල් අළුත්නුවර කතරගම දේවාලය
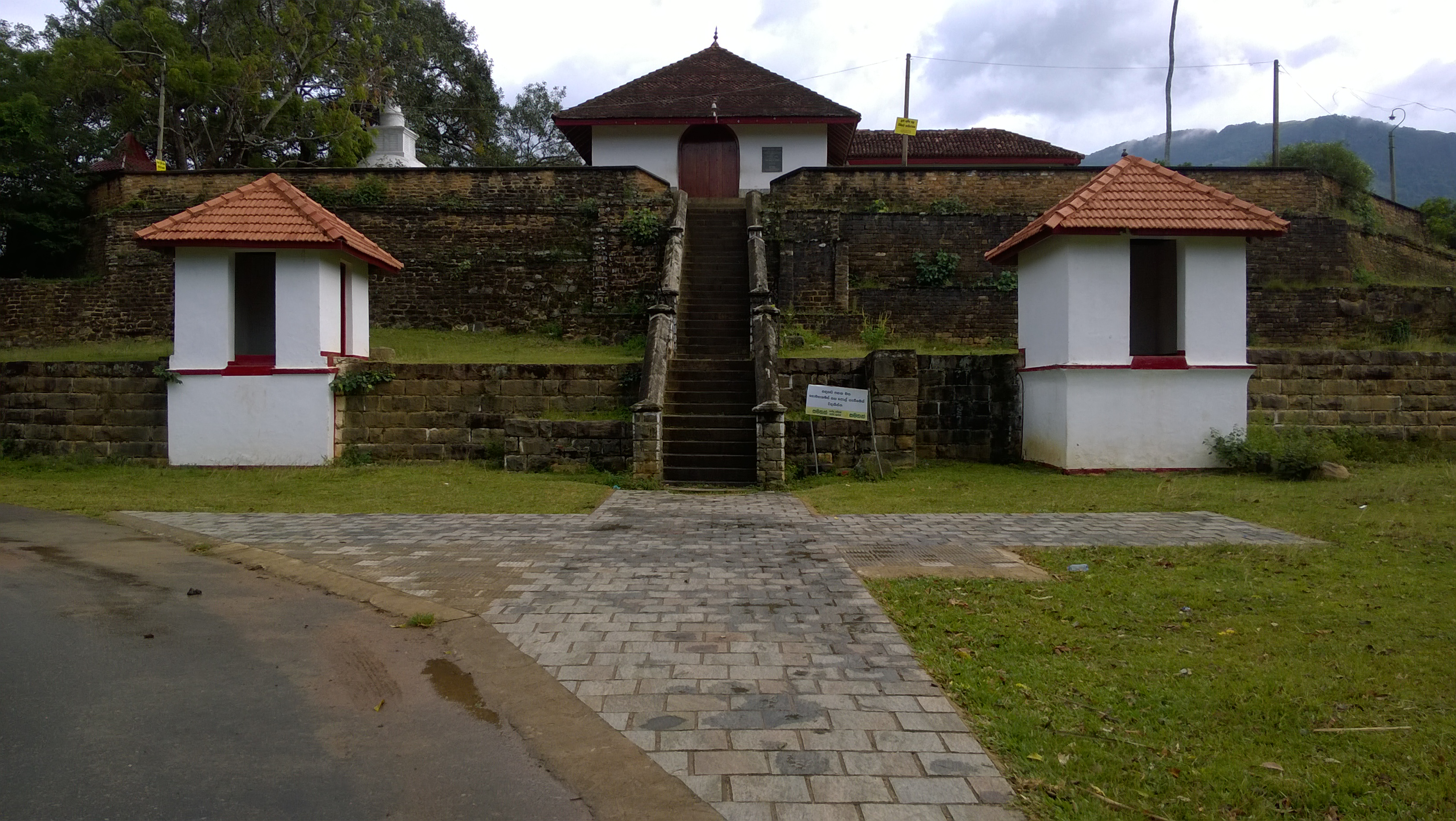

Religion
- Affiliation: Buddhism
- District: Ratnapura
- Province: Sabaragamuwa Province
- Deity: Kataragama deviyo

Location
- Location: Uggal Aluthnuwara, Balangoda, Sri Lanka
- Interactive map of Uggal Aluthnuwara Kataragama Devalaya උග්ගල් අළුත්නුවර කතරගම දේවාලය
- Coordinates: 06°41′03.0″N 80°44′48.7″E

Architecture
- Type: Devalaya
- Founder: King Suriya
- Completed: 1382

Uggal Aluthnuwara Kataragama Devalaya (Sinhala: උග්ගල් අළුත්නුවර කතරගම දේවාලය) is an ancient devalaya, situated in Uggal Aluthnuwara, Sri Lanka. It lies on Colombo - Batticaloa main road, approximately 9 km (5.6 mi) away from the Balangoda town. The shrine is dedicated to the Sinhalese deity Kataragama deviyo, who is believed as a guardian deity of the Buddha Sasana in Sri Lanka. The devalaya has been formally recognised by the government as an archaeological protected monument. The designation was declared on 3 September 1999 under the government Gazette number 1096.

== History ==
According to the written history, Uggal Aluthnuwara Devalaya was first constructed in 1382 as Medagama Devalaya by a King named Suriya. It is said that the King Suriya refers to King Bhuvanakabahu V (1374–1408) of Gampola Kingdom who belonged to the Suriya clan. The king built the devalaya and dedicated it to deity Kataragama deviyo. However the present devalaya complex and its related buildings have been erected in 1582 by a king called Yapa Maharaja, 200 years after the construction of original Medagama Devalaya.

References about the King Yapa Maharaja is only found in the old documents belonging to the devalaya and there is no further historical mentions regarding the any of a king by this name. It is said that the King Yapa made a vow at the Jack tree of the Medagma devalaya to build a new devala complex and a town at the site if he wins the war against the Portuguese. According to these local information and chronological facts of other historical resources, historians believe that the King Yapa is no other than King Rajasingha I. The jack tree at which the Yapa Maharaja made his wow in 1582 still can be seen at the temple premises and known as Kos Ruppaya.

== See also ==
- Badulla Kataragama Devalaya
- Kataragama temple
