= Eheliyagoda =

Eheliyagoda: ඇහැලියගොඩ; எஹெலியகொடை
- Town
- Location within Sri Lanka
- Coordinates: 6.8486°N 80.2600°E
- Country: Sri Lanka
- Province: Sabaragamuwa
- District: Ratnapura
- Time zone: UTC+5:30 (Sri Lanka Standard Time)
- Sri Lanka Post: 70600
- Area code: 045

Eheliyagoda is a town in Ratnapura District, Sabaragamuwa Province, Sri Lanka. It is located approximately 72 km (45 mi) east of Colombo.

The town is the centre of traditional gemstone mining and rubber plantations. Ekanite, a rare radioactive gemstone, was first discovered in Eheliyagoda in 1953 by F. L. D. Ekanayake.

In 2018 Eheliyagoda was identified as a priority town, to be developed under the Small and Medium Town Development Programme being undertaken by the Ministry of Defence and Urban Development. Proposed improvements under the programme include a public fair and playgrounds.

Religion in Eheliyagoda DS Division (2012)
1. Buddhist (88.6%)
2. Hindu (4.74%)
3. Muslim (5.29%)
4. Roman Catholic (0.74%)
5. Other Christian (0.64%)
6. Other (0.01%)

== Transport ==
Eheliyagoda was one of the railway stations on the Kelani Valley line, when the narrow gauge railway line between Avissawella to Opanayake via Ratnapura was opened in 1919. It was closed in 1976 when the branch line between Avissawella and Opanayake was shut down.

The town straddles the A4 (Colombo-Batticaloa) Highway.

== Educational ==
The main schools in Eheliyagoda are:

- Eheliyagoda National College (Est. 1904)
- Eheliyagoda Dharmapala National College(Est. 1926)
- Eheliyagoda Al/Aqsa Muslim Maha Vidyalaya.
- Amuhenkanda vimalasara maha vidyalaya

== Religion ==
The main temples in the town are:

- Pushparama Purana Viharaya
- Madarasinharama Temple
- Mahara Purana Viharaya
- Sri Nagarukkarama Maha Viharaya
- Ambanoluwa Rajamaha Viharaya
- Sri Vimalaramaya thalavitiya

The main mousqe in the town are:

- Al Falah jumma Masjidh (V727+9H8, Ratnapura Road, Eheliyagoda, Sri Lanka)
