= Weligepola Divisional Secretariat =

- Divisional Secretariat
- Interactive map of Weligepola Divisional Secretariat
- Country: Sri Lanka
- Province: Sabaragamuwa Province
- District: Ratnapura District
- Time zone: UTC+5:30 (Sri Lanka Standard Time)

Weligepola Divisional Secretariat is a Divisional Secretariat of Ratnapura District, of Sabaragamuwa Province, Sri Lanka.

Religion in Weligepola DS Division (2012)
1. Buddhist (98.7%)
2. Hindu (1.10%)
3. Muslim (0.00%)
4. Roman Catholic (0.10%)
5. Other Christian (0.10%)
6. Other (0.00%)

== Education ==
•R/Sri Walagamba Maha Vidyalaya-Weligepola

•R/Udaranwala Vidyalaya-

•Weeraseekara Vidyalaya-Pollamura
