= Kolonna Divisional Secretariat =

Kolonna Divisional Secretariat Kolonna koralaya Kolonna koralaya
- Divisional Secretariat
- Location within Sri Lanka
- Country: Sri Lanka
- Province: Sabaragamuwa Province
- District: Ratnapura District
- Pradeshiya Sabha: Kolonna Pradeshiya Sabha
- Time zone: UTC+5:30 (Sri Lanka Standard Time)

Kolonna Divisional Secretariat is a Divisional Secretariat of Ratnapura District, of Sabaragamuwa Province, Sri Lanka.

Religion in Kolonna DS Division (2012)
1. Buddhist (90.0%)
2. Hindu (8.70%)
3. Muslim (0.10%)
4. Roman Catholic (0.60%)
5. Other Christian (0.60%)
6. Other (0.00%)
