= Kalawana =

Kalawana කලවාන கலாவான
- Town
- Location within Sri Lanka
- Coordinates: 6°31′53.48″N 80°23′48.3″E
- Country: Sri Lanka
- Province: Sabaragamuwa
- District: Ratnapura
- Division: Kalawana

Area
  - Total: 379 km^{2} (146 sq mi)

Population (2012)
  - Total: 51,307
  - Density: 135.4/km^{2} (351/sq mi)
- Time zone: UTC+5:30 (Sri Lanka Standard Time)
- Postal code: 70450

Kalawana (Sinhala: කලවාන, Tamil: கலாவானா) is a town in the Ratnapura District of Sabaragamuwa Province in Sri Lanka.

Kalawana is located approximately 30 km (19 mi) away from Ratnapura and 100 km (62 mi) to the south-east of Colombo.

Gem Trade, Tea Plantation and Tourism had been the main source of income for many families in Kalawana for decades.

Kalawana is in the vicinity of the Sinharaja Forest Reserve which is an UNESCO World Heritage site and a biodiversity hotspot in Sri Lanka.

The Kukule Ganga Dam is also located in Kalawana area on the Kukule river.

Religion in Kalawana DS Division (2012)
1. Buddhist (85.5%)
2. Hindu (13.2%)
3. Muslim (0.10%)
4. Roman Catholic (0.30%)
5. Other Christian (1.00%)
6. Other (0.00%)

== Climate ==
Ratnapura - Kalawana belongs to the wet zone of Sri Lanka where ample amount of rain is received throughout the year. The average temperature is 30 degrees Celsius during day time and high humidity is sometimes experienced.

== Schools ==
- Kalawana Central College (National School)
- Gamini Central College
- Rambuka e Village School
- Meepaga Jayanthi Maha Vidyalaya
- Weddagala South Maha Vidyalaya
- Pothupitiya Maha Vidyalaya
- Wewagama Vidyalaya
- Pitigalakanda Vidyalaya
- Nawalakanda Vidyalaya
- Kalawana Primary School
- Wewelkandura Vidyala
- Kalawana Tamil College
- Samanpura Model Primary School
- Pedikanda Vidyalaya
- Royal Primary College
- Kalawana Model Primary School
- Delgoda Vidyalaya
- Wathurawa Janapada Vidyalaya
- Kalawana Gamini Primary School
- Delgoda Janapada Vidyalaya
- Weddagala North Vidyalaya
- Gagalagamuwa Vidyalaya
- Weddagala Kudawa Vidyalaya
- Kudumiriya Vidyalaya
- Panapola Vidyalaya
- Kosgulana Vidyalaya
- Ilumbakanda Vidyalaya
- Ilumbakanada New College
- Kajugaswaththa Vidyalaya
- Kopikella Vidyalaya
- Rambuka New Primary School
- Thanabela Mahawilahena Vidyalaya
- Dipdeen Tamil School

== Hospitals ==
- Kalawana Base Hospital
- Pothupitiya Divisional Hospital

== Police Stations ==
- Kalawana Police Station
- Pothupitiya Sub Police Station

== Gallery ==
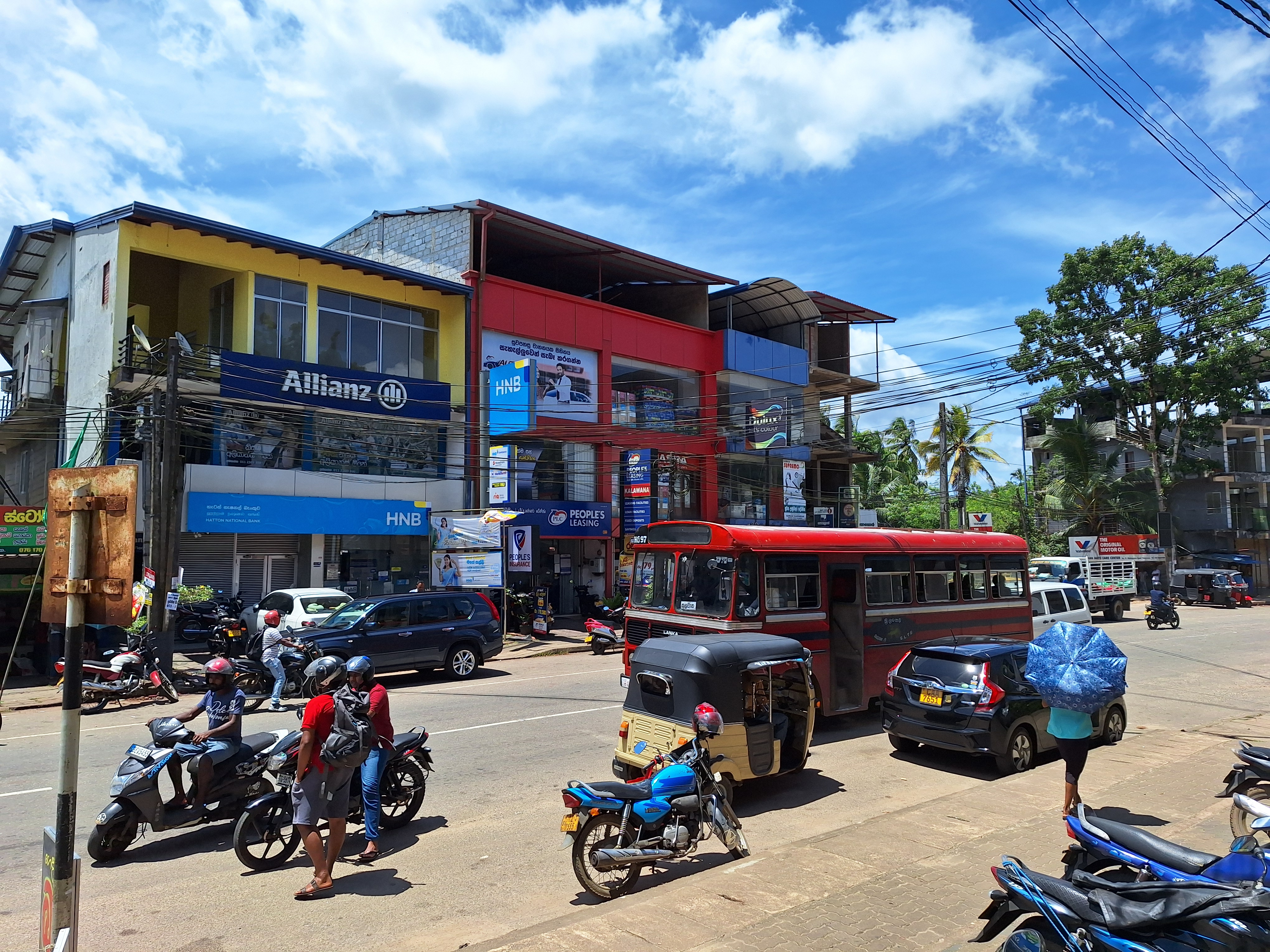
Tiruwanaketiya-Agalawatte Rd in 2024
