= Embilipitiya Divisional Secretariat =

- Divisional Secretariat
- Interactive map of Embilipitiya Divisional Secretariat
- Country: Sri Lanka
- Province: Sabaragamuwa Province
- District: Ratnapura District
- Time zone: UTC+5:30 (Sri Lanka Standard Time)

Embilipitiya Divisional Secretariat is a Divisional Secretariat of Ratnapura District, of Sabaragamuwa Province, Sri Lanka.

Religion in Embilipitiya DS Division (2012)
1. Buddhist (99.5%)
2. Hindu (0.10%)
3. Muslim (0.00%)
4. Roman Catholic (0.20%)
5. Other Christian (0.20%)
6. Other (0.00%)
