= Kuruvita Divisional Secretariat =

- Divisional Secretariat
- Country: Sri Lanka
- Province: Sabaragamuwa Province
- District: Ratnapura District
- Divisional Secretary: A.S.J. Godallawaththa
- Time zone: UTC+5:30 (Sri Lanka Standard Time)

Kuruvita Divisional Secretariat is a Divisional Secretariat of Ratnapura District, of Sabaragamuwa Province, Sri Lanka.
