= Aramanapola Raja Maha Vihara =

Buddhist temple in Ganegama, Sri Lanka

Aramanapola Raja Maha Vihara (English: Aramanapola Great Royal Temple)
- අරමණපොළ රජ මහා විහාරය
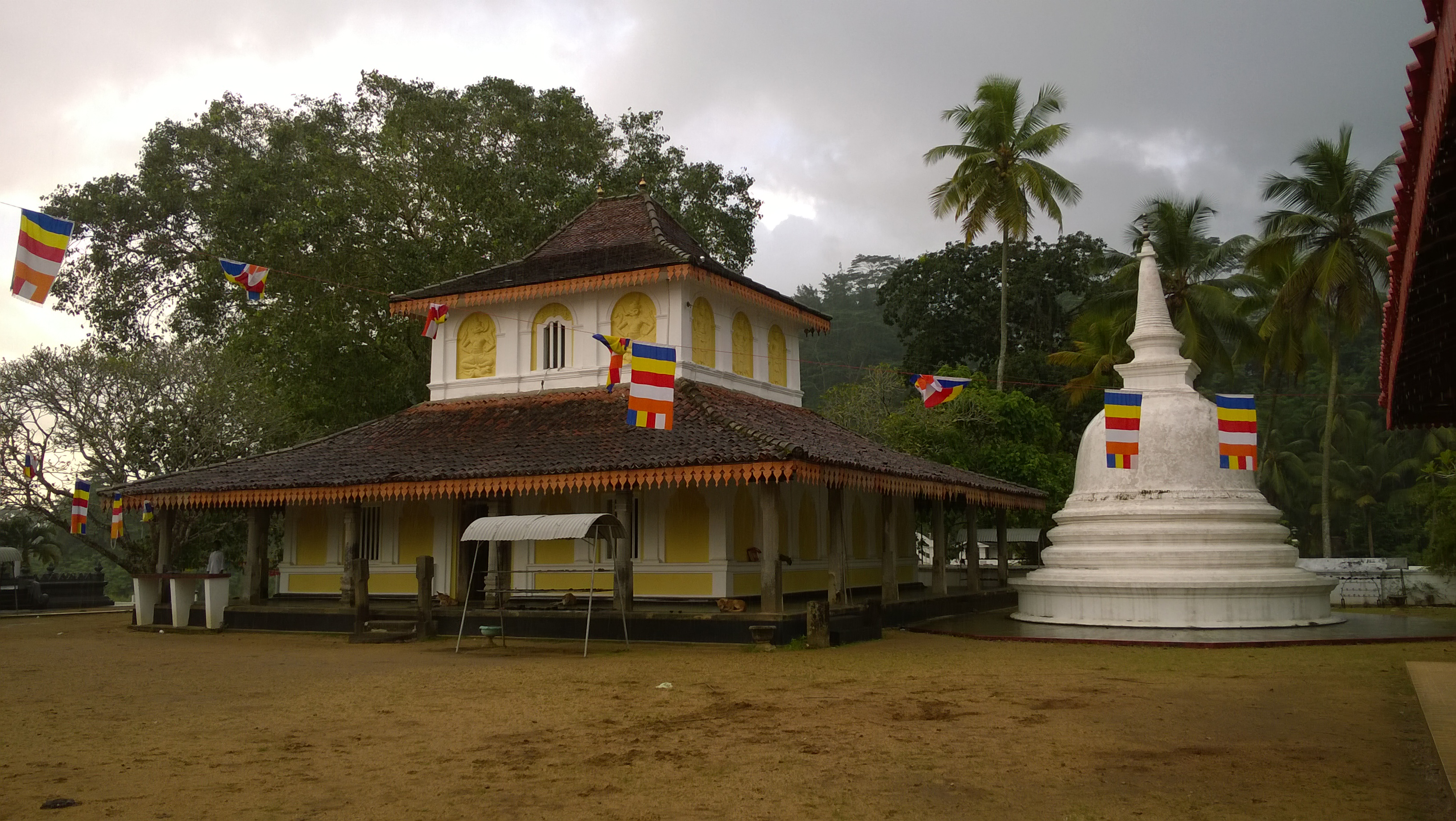
- The image house and the Stupa

Religion
- Affiliation: Buddhism
- District: Ratnapura
- Province: Sabaragamuwa Province

Location
- Location: Ganegama, Pelmadulla, Sri Lanka
- Interactive map of Aramanapola Raja Maha Vihara (English: Aramanapola Great Royal Temple)
- Coordinates: 06°38′04.3″N 80°31′22.2″E

Architecture
- Type: Buddhist Temple

Aramanapola Raja Maha Vihara or Ganegama Rankoth Vihara (Sinhala: අරමණපොළ රජ මහා විහාරය, English: Aramanapola Great Royal Temple) is an ancient Buddhist temple in Ganegama, Sri Lanka. The Vihara is located approximately 2.5 km (1.6 mi) far away from the Pelmadulla town on Colombo - Batticaloa main road (A4). The temple has been formally recognised by the Government as an archaeological site in Sri Lanka. The designation was declared on 2 March 1951 under the government Gazette number 10217. As part of the name of several temples, Raja Maha Vihara means in English: Great Royal Temple or Great Royal Monastery. It designates ancient Sri Lankan Buddhist temples that historically received royal patronage and donations from the king.

== Name ==
Aramanapola temple is referred to in historical sources as Denawaka Viharaya and Ganegama Viharaya. In the early periods, this region was called Denawaka as the river Denawaka Ganga flows through this area. The word Denawaka is said to be broken from Dona Wakka (basin) as the area is located between the hilltops of Kiribathgala & Kuttapitiya. Word Dona Wakka became Denawaka and the temple located in Denawaka was begun to call as Denawaka Viharaya. The temple is also referred to in Vihara Asna (Nam Potha), a Kandyan period compiled book about important Buddhist centres in the country.

The temple is also known as Ganegama Viharaya as Buddhist monks called Ganinwahansela lived in this temple during the Kandyan era. It is said that in this period, the country's Buddhism was in declined state due to colonial rule. The monks maintained the temple with many difficulties and due to that the temple was called Ganegama temple.

In the present day the temple is known as Aramanapola Viharaya. According to the Sabaragamu Vamsakathawa, Buddhism in the country had suffered a lot after the Chola rule in 993-1077 time period. During the reign of King Vijayabhahu I (1077–1110) there was a lack of monks necessary for doing Upasampada Karma (ordination) of Buddhist monks. To re-establish Buddhism in the country, Vijayabahu I invited higher ordinate Buddhist monks from Arammana area of Myanmar. People believe that those monks have used this temple during their mission in the country. So it is said that this temple has got its name Aramanapola Viharaya, as the Buddhist monks from Aramana area of Myanmar lived here.

== History ==
The history of Aramanapola Vihara is dated back to the reign of King Devanampiya Tissa (250-210 BC) of Anuradhapura Kingdom. It is believed that one of 32 saplings of sacred Jaya Sri Maha Bodhi have been planted in this temple premises by the king. The Sinhala Bodhivamsa, written by Rev. Wilgamula thero in Kurunegala period, also mentions that the Bodhi Tree in Ganegama was planted in Anuradhapura era by King Devanampiya Tissa. The temple is again mentioned in the reign of King Parakramabahu I (1153–1186) of Polonnaruwa kingdom. It is said that King Vijayabahu I established a military camp at a basin between hilltop of Kiribathgala and Kuttapitiya which is believed to be this location.

During the 15th century the Sabaragamuwa area was under the rule of Kingdom of Kotte and ruled by King Parakramabahu VI (1411–1463). King Parakramabahu VI developed many temples around his territory in honor of his mother Sunethradevi. The name of Aramanapola Viharaya is mentioned in the Pepiliyana Sunethradevi Pirivena inscription of Parakramabahu VI. The king developed the Vihara as complete temple with all aspects and assigned it under the Sunethradevi Pirivena in Pepiliyana.

== The temple ==
The temple consists mainly of a Stupa, image house, sacred Bodhi Tree, Dhamma discourse hall and Bhikku dwellings. The image house consists of Kotte era paintings and is built using 27 carved rock pillars. Inside the most inner chamber of the image house is the main Samadhi Buddha statue with other related statues and paintings. The inner chamber is entered with a carved stone door frame (Gal Uluhau) and the corners of the building have been strengthened using stone columns. The Bodhi Tree of the Vihara which is believed to be one of 32 saplings of Jaya Sri Maha Bodhi, has been identified as the largest Bodhi tree among the 32 Bodhis that are found in the island.
