= Kalawana Divisional Secretariat =

- Divisional Secretariat
- Interactive map of Kalawana Divisional Secretariat
- Country: Sri Lanka
- Province: Sabaragamuwa Province
- District: Ratnapura District
- Time zone: UTC+5:30 (Sri Lanka Standard Time)

Kalawana Divisional Secretariat is a Divisional Secretariat of Ratnapura District, of Sabaragamuwa Province, Sri Lanka.

== Demography-Religion ==
Religion in Kalawana DS Division (2012)
1. Buddhist (85.5%)
2. Hindu (13.2%)
3. Muslim (0.10%)
4. Roman Catholic (0.30%)
5. Other Christian (1.00%)
6. Other (0.00%)
