= Kahawatta Divisional Secretariat =

- Divisional Secretariat
- Interactive map of Kahawatta Divisional Secretariat
- Country: Sri Lanka
- Province: Sabaragamuwa Province
- District: Ratnapura District

Government
  - Divisional Secretary: B. T. Gayani I. Karunarathna

Area
  - Total: 10,205 ha (25,220 acres)

Population (2012)
  - Total: 48,661
- Time zone: UTC+5:30 (Sri Lanka Standard Time)

Kahawatta Divisional Secretariat is a Divisional Secretariat of Ratnapura District, of Sabaragamuwa Province, Sri Lanka.

Kahawatta is one of the seventeen divisions in the Ratnapura District and has 21 Grama Niladhari divisions, the largest of which is Wellandura and Yainna. It is 10,205 hectares (25,217 acres) in area, with a population of 48,661. 77% of the population is Sinhalese, 20% is Tamil and 3% are Muslim.
