= Kukulugala =

- Location within Sri Lanka

Highest point
- Elevation: 704 m (2,310 ft)
- Coordinates: 6°39′52″N 80°15′50″E

Geography
- Location: Sri Lanka

Kukulugala is a mountain in the Rathnapura District of Sri Lanka. At a summit elevation of 704 m (2,310 ft), it is the 18th tallest mountain in Sri Lanka.

== See also ==
- List of mountains of Sri Lanka
