= Embilipitiya =

Embilipitiya ඇඹිලිපිටිය எம்பிலிபிட்டி
- City
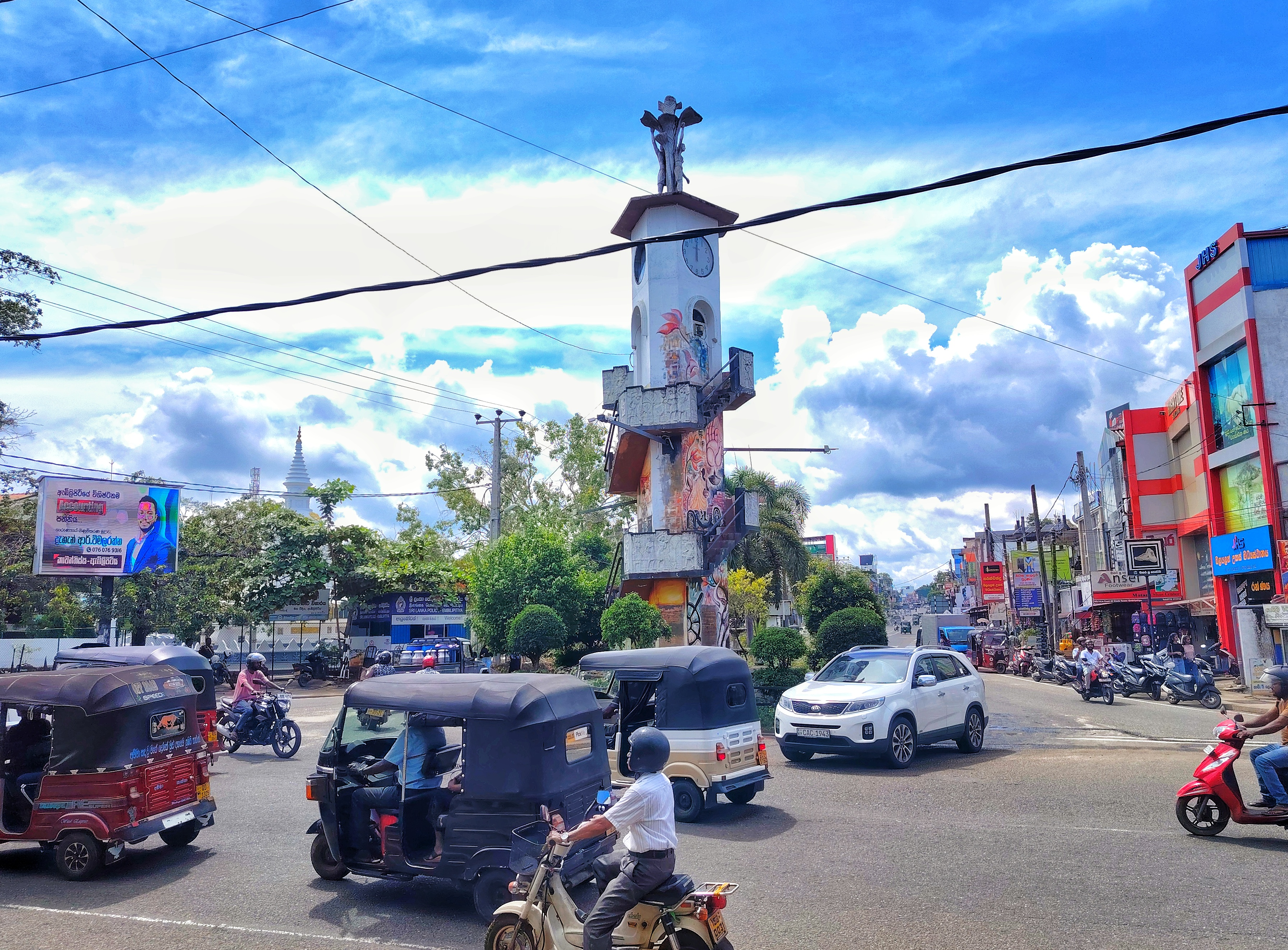
- Embilipitiya Clock Tower

- Location in Sri Lanka
- Coordinates: 6°20′38″N 80°50′56″E
- Country: Sri Lanka
- Province: Sabaragamuwa Province
- District: Ratnapura District
- Local Government: Embilipitiya Urban Council
- Population: 58,351 (2012 census)

Government
  - Type: Urban Council
  - Chairman: Dinesh Madhusanka
- Time zone: +5.30

Embilipitiya is a town, governed by an urban council, in Ratnapura District, Sabaragamuwa Province, Sri Lanka.

In the 1970s it was a small town with two or three small boutiques. Under the Udawalawe development project, Embilipitiya grew and currently it is one of towns in Sri Lanka with a modern infrastructure. Embilipitiya is becoming the central hub and the commercial centre of Greater Hambantota development project. Embilipitiya is the nearest city to Sooriyawewa International Cricket Stadium and Mattala International Airport.

Embilipitiya DS Division area is predominantly Sinhala Buddhist. According to 2012 census data, the religious composition in Embilipitiya DS Division area is as follows: Buddhists 134,041-99.50%, Roman Catholics 310-0.23%, Other Christians 203-0.15%, Hindus 93-0.07%, Muslims 63-0.05%, Others 3-0.00%.

== Transportation ==
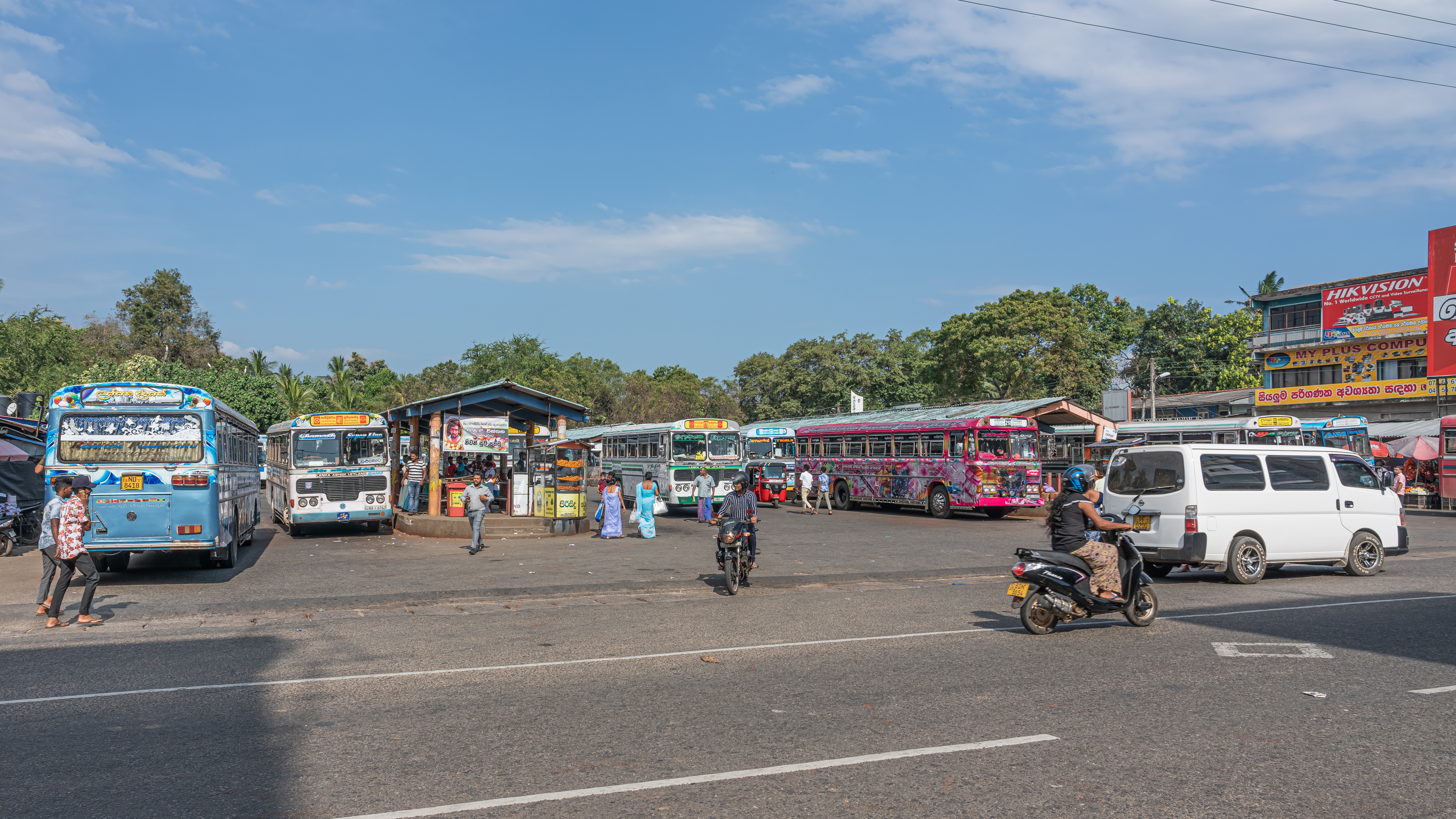
Embilipitiya bus station

During the 1970s transportation to and from Embilipitiya was difficult. There were two or three buses from Embilipitiya to Ratnapura and there was no guarantee that they would be running daily. However, the transportation system developed significantly. There are buses from Embilipitiya to Ratnapura and Colombo every five minutes and the Embilipitiya bus station is one of the busiest in Southern and Sabaragamuwa region. With the construction of the Southern Expressway, the expressway will be accessible through the Barawakumbuka entrance via Embilipitiya.

== Education ==
Schools within Embilipitiya Urban council area include Embilipitiya Technical College, Embilipitiya President's College, Embilipitiya Maha Vidyalaya, Sri Bodhiraja International College, Embilipitiya Junior Secondary School, Moraketiya Maha Vidyalaya, Halmillaketiya Maha Vidyalaya, and Modrawana Maha Vidyalaya.

== Infrastructure ==
Embilipitya has branches of almost all private and public banks and also the town is served by number of supermarket chains.

== Urban Council ==
Embilipitiya became an urban council in 2006 and it is the only urban council in Sri Lanka to be promoted from village council and it is one of the three urban councils (Kegalle, Balangoda and Embilipitiya) in Sabaragamuwa province.

== Economy ==
The Economic Centre and the international leaders' training center are institutions in Embilipitiya. Public and private institutes aim to help people engaged in the small-scale food processing sector to develop relevant skills and technology, and to increase their access to information which will contribute towards helping them gain control of their livelihoods and communities.

== See also ==
- List of railway stations in Sri Lanka
- List of municipalities in Sri Lanka
