= Imbulpe Divisional Secretariat =

Imbulpe Divisional Secretariat ඉඹුල්පේ
- Divisional Secretariat
- Location within Sri Lanka
- Coordinates: 6.7008°N 80.7533°E
- Country: Sri Lanka
- Province: Sabaragamuwa Province
- District: Ratnapura District
- Time zone: UTC+5:30 (Sri Lanka Standard Time)

Imbulpe Divisional Secretariat is a Divisional Secretariat of Ratnapura District, of Sabaragamuwa Province, Sri Lanka.

Religion in Imbulpe DS Division (2012)
1. Buddhist (84.2%)
2. Hindu (12.7%)
3. Muslim (0.10%)
4. Roman Catholic (1.90%)
5. Other Christian (1.00%)
6. Other (0.00%)
