= Eheliyagoda Polling Division =

Eheliyagoda
- Polling Division
- Interactive map of Eheliyagoda
- Coordinates: 6.806782°N 80.302240°E
- Country: Sri Lanka
- Province: Sabaragamuwa Province, Sri Lanka
- Electoral District: Ratnapura Electoral District

Area
  - Total: 411.46 km^{2} (158.87 sq mi)

Population (2012)
  - Total: 199,098
  - Density: 484/km^{2} (1,250/sq mi)
- ISO 3166 code: EC-21A

The Eheliyagoda Polling Division is a Polling Division in the Ratnapura Electoral District, in the Sabaragamuwa Province, Sri Lanka.

== Presidential Election Results ==
=== Summary ===
The winner of Eheliyagoda has matched the final country result in 7 out of 8 elections in Sri Lanka. Hence, Eheliyagoda is a Bellwether for Presidential Elections.

Year	Eheliyagoda	Ratnapura Electoral District	MAE %	Sri Lanka	MAE %
2019	SLPP	SLPP	1.00%	SLPP	7.77%
2015	UPFA	UPFA	2.24%	NDF	10.33%
2010	UPFA	UPFA	2.47%	UPFA	8.18%
2005	UPFA	UPFA	2.18%	UPFA	4.94%
1999	PA	PA	1.28%	PA	2.05%
1994	PA	PA	2.21%	PA	1.93%
1988	UNP	UNP	3.20%	UNP	3.37%
1982	UNP	UNP	1.84%	UNP	2.78%
Matches/Mean MAE	7/8	7/8	2.05%	8/8	5.17%

=== 2019 Sri Lankan Presidential Election ===
Party	Eheliyagoda		Ratnapura Electoral District		Sri Lanka	
Party	Votes	%	Votes	%	Votes	%
SLPP	50,993	61.11%	448,044	59.93%	6,924,255	52.25%
NDF	28,855	34.58%	264,503	35.38%	5,564,239	41.99%
NMPP	1,946	2.33%	18,887	2.53%	418,553	3.16%
Other Parties (with < 1%)	1,647	1.97%	16,237	2.17%	345,452	2.61%
Valid Votes	83,441	99.30%	747,671	99.22%	13,252,499	98.99%
Rejected Votes	587	0.70%	5,853	0.78%	135,452	1.01%
Total Polled	84,028	86.35%	753,524	87.11%	13,387,951	83.71%
Registered Electors	97,311		864,979		15,992,568	

=== 2015 Sri Lankan Presidential Election ===
Party	Eheliyagoda		Ratnapura Electoral District		Sri Lanka	
Party	Votes	%	Votes	%	Votes	%
UPFA	45,606	58.14%	379,053	55.74%	5,768,090	47.58%
NDF	32,106	40.93%	292,514	43.01%	6,217,162	51.28%
Other Parties (with < 1%)	731	0.93%	8,517	1.25%	138,200	1.14%
Valid Votes	78,443	99.19%	680,084	98.89%	12,123,452	98.85%
Rejected Votes	638	0.81%	7,656	1.11%	140,925	1.15%
Total Polled	79,081	82.23%	687,740	82.69%	12,264,377	78.69%
Registered Electors	96,170		831,712		15,585,942	

=== 2010 Sri Lankan Presidential Election ===
Party	Eheliyagoda		Ratnapura Electoral District		Sri Lanka	
Party	Votes	%	Votes	%	Votes	%
UPFA	46,177	66.37%	377,734	63.76%	6,015,934	57.88%
NDF	22,277	32.02%	203,566	34.36%	4,173,185	40.15%
Other Parties (with < 1%)	1,121	1.61%	11,126	1.88%	204,494	1.97%
Valid Votes	69,575	99.41%	592,426	99.26%	10,393,613	99.03%
Rejected Votes	416	0.59%	4,430	0.74%	101,838	0.97%
Total Polled	69,991	78.19%	596,856	79.75%	10,495,451	66.70%
Registered Electors	89,518		748,404		15,734,587	

=== 2005 Sri Lankan Presidential Election ===
Party	Eheliyagoda		Ratnapura Electoral District		Sri Lanka	
Party	Votes	%	Votes	%	Votes	%
UPFA	37,243	55.34%	294,260	53.01%	4,887,152	50.29%
UNP	29,255	43.47%	252,838	45.55%	4,706,366	48.43%
Other Parties (with < 1%)	804	1.19%	7,976	1.44%	123,521	1.27%
Valid Votes	67,302	99.26%	555,074	99.02%	9,717,039	98.88%
Rejected Votes	502	0.74%	5,510	0.98%	109,869	1.12%
Total Polled	67,804	81.00%	560,584	82.57%	9,826,908	69.51%
Registered Electors	83,705		678,909		14,136,979	

=== 1999 Sri Lankan Presidential Election ===
Party	Eheliyagoda		Ratnapura Electoral District		Sri Lanka	
Party	Votes	%	Votes	%	Votes	%
PA	31,228	53.45%	250,409	52.13%	4,312,157	51.12%
UNP	23,868	40.85%	202,621	42.18%	3,602,748	42.71%
JVP	1,502	2.57%	16,482	3.43%	343,927	4.08%
LDA	949	1.62%	2,007	0.42%	23,668	0.28%
Other Parties (with < 1%)	882	1.51%	8,845	1.84%	153,011	1.81%
Valid Votes	58,429	97.93%	480,364	98.15%	8,435,754	97.69%
Rejected Votes	1,236	2.07%	9,038	1.85%	199,536	2.31%
Total Polled	59,665	78.17%	489,402	81.27%	8,635,290	72.17%
Registered Electors	76,327		602,172		11,965,536	

=== 1994 Sri Lankan Presidential Election ===
Party	Eheliyagoda		Ratnapura Electoral District		Sri Lanka	
Party	Votes	%	Votes	%	Votes	%
PA	32,647	60.46%	257,265	58.07%	4,709,205	62.28%
UNP	20,589	38.13%	177,924	40.16%	2,715,283	35.91%
Other Parties (with < 1%)	761	1.41%	7,842	1.77%	137,040	1.81%
Valid Votes	53,997	98.71%	443,031	98.31%	7,561,526	98.03%
Rejected Votes	705	1.29%	7,595	1.69%	151,706	1.97%
Total Polled	54,702	76.38%	450,626	80.02%	7,713,232	69.12%
Registered Electors	71,614		563,174		11,158,880	

=== 1988 Sri Lankan Presidential Election ===
Party	Eheliyagoda		Ratnapura Electoral District		Sri Lanka	
Party	Votes	%	Votes	%	Votes	%
UNP	24,281	54.00%	180,622	51.75%	2,569,199	50.43%
SLFP	18,647	41.47%	159,879	45.81%	2,289,857	44.95%
SLMP	2,037	4.53%	8,516	2.44%	235,701	4.63%
Valid Votes	44,965	98.83%	349,017	98.84%	5,094,754	98.24%
Rejected Votes	533	1.17%	4,113	1.16%	91,499	1.76%
Total Polled	45,498	74.34%	353,130	76.64%	5,186,256	55.87%
Registered Electors	61,203		460,735		9,283,143	

=== 1982 Sri Lankan Presidential Election ===
Party	Eheliyagoda		Ratnapura Electoral District		Sri Lanka	
Party	Votes	%	Votes	%	Votes	%
UNP	23,721	49.81%	175,903	50.90%	3,450,815	52.93%
SLFP	19,742	41.45%	152,506	44.13%	2,546,348	39.05%
NSSP	2,987	6.27%	3,494	1.01%	16,995	0.26%
JVP	851	1.79%	11,283	3.26%	273,428	4.19%
Other Parties (with < 1%)	326	0.68%	2,418	0.70%	232,465	3.57%
Valid Votes	47,627	98.24%	345,604	99.02%	6,520,156	98.78%
Rejected Votes	855	1.76%	3,407	0.98%	80,470	1.22%
Total Polled	48,482	85.67%	349,011	85.91%	6,600,626	80.15%
Registered Electors	56,592		406,275		8,235,358	

== Parliamentary Election Results ==
=== Summary ===
The winner of Eheliyagoda has matched the final country result 6 out of 7 times. Hence, Eheliyagoda is a Bellwether for Parliamentary Elections.

Year	Eheliyagoda	Ratnapura Electoral District	MAE %	Sri Lanka	MAE %
2015	UPFA	UPFA	1.69%	UNP	5.69%
2010	UPFA	UPFA	10.67%	UPFA	7.01%
2004	UPFA	UPFA	1.18%	UPFA	3.99%
2001	UNP	UNP	0.77%	UNP	3.06%
2000	PA	PA	2.44%	PA	1.37%
1994	PA	PA	3.52%	PA	2.61%
1989	UNP	UNP	7.37%	UNP	7.70%
Matches/Mean MAE	6/7	6/7	2.64%	7/7	4.49%

=== 2015 Sri Lankan Parliamentary Election ===
Party	Eheliyagoda		Ratnapura Electoral District		Sri Lanka	
Party	Votes	%	Votes	%	Votes	%
UPFA	38,162	53.23%	323,636	51.21%	4,732,664	42.48%
UNP	31,211	43.53%	284,117	44.96%	5,098,916	45.77%
JVP	2,057	2.87%	21,525	3.41%	544,154	4.88%
Other Parties (with < 1%)	262	0.37%	2,720	0.43%	83,333	0.75%
Valid Votes	71,692	96.90%	631,998	96.46%	11,140,333	95.35%
Rejected Votes	2,272	3.07%	23,026	3.51%	516,926	4.42%
Total Polled	73,989	76.94%	655,222	80.88%	11,684,111	77.66%
Registered Electors	96,170		810,082		15,044,490	

=== 2010 Sri Lankan Parliamentary Election ===
Party	Eheliyagoda		Ratnapura Electoral District		Sri Lanka	
Party	Votes	%	Votes	%	Votes	%
UPFA	37,329	70.57%	305,327	68.87%	4,846,388	60.38%
UNP	14,346	27.12%	125,076	28.21%	2,357,057	29.37%
DNA	1,012	1.91%	11,053	2.49%	441,251	5.50%
Other Parties (with < 1%)	211	0.40%	1,853	0.42%	35,498	0.44%
Valid Votes	52,898	93.20%	443,309	92.28%	8,026,322	96.03%
Rejected Votes	3,851	6.78%	37,022	7.71%	581,465	6.96%
Total Polled	56,759	63.41%	480,395	64.02%	8,358,246	59.29%
Registered Electors	89,518		750,416		14,097,690	

=== 2004 Sri Lankan Parliamentary Election ===
Party	Eheliyagoda		Ratnapura Electoral District		Sri Lanka	
Party	Votes	%	Votes	%	Votes	%
UPFA	31,341	51.58%	261,450	53.14%	4,223,126	45.70%
UNP	24,934	41.03%	205,490	41.77%	3,486,792	37.73%
JHU	3,142	5.17%	20,801	4.23%	552,723	5.98%
NLF	944	1.55%	1,336	0.27%	8,452	0.09%
Other Parties (with < 1%)	403	0.66%	2,926	0.59%	49,630	0.54%
Valid Votes	60,764	94.97%	492,003	94.55%	9,241,931	94.52%
Rejected Votes	3,220	5.03%	28,346	5.45%	534,452	5.47%
Total Polled	63,984	78.36%	520,349	80.42%	9,777,821	75.74%
Registered Electors	81,652		647,035		12,909,631	

=== 2001 Sri Lankan Parliamentary Election ===
Party	Eheliyagoda		Ratnapura Electoral District		Sri Lanka	
Party	Votes	%	Votes	%	Votes	%
UNP	27,594	45.95%	227,202	46.41%	4,086,026	45.62%
PA	26,773	44.59%	212,794	43.46%	3,330,815	37.19%
JVP	4,448	7.41%	40,377	8.25%	815,353	9.10%
Other Parties (with < 1%)	1,231	2.05%	9,205	1.88%	131,990	1.47%
Valid Votes	60,046	94.80%	489,578	94.14%	8,955,844	94.77%
Rejected Votes	3,294	5.20%	30,483	5.86%	494,009	5.23%
Total Polled	63,340	79.93%	520,061	83.41%	9,449,878	76.03%
Registered Electors	79,242		623,506		12,428,762	

=== 2000 Sri Lankan Parliamentary Election ===
Party	Eheliyagoda		Ratnapura Electoral District		Sri Lanka	
Party	Votes	%	Votes	%	Votes	%
PA	27,885	47.38%	244,142	50.63%	3,899,329	45.33%
UNP	23,985	40.75%	204,017	42.30%	3,451,765	40.12%
L&DA	4,272	7.26%	6,158	1.28%	9,781	0.11%
JVP	1,907	3.24%	22,222	4.61%	518,725	6.03%
Other Parties (with < 1%)	810	1.38%	5,715	1.19%	229,640	2.67%
Valid Votes	58,859	N/A	482,254	N/A	8,602,617	N/A

=== 1994 Sri Lankan Parliamentary Election ===
Party	Eheliyagoda		Ratnapura Electoral District		Sri Lanka	
Party	Votes	%	Votes	%	Votes	%
PA	30,714	54.13%	233,687	50.77%	3,887,805	48.94%
UNP	25,070	44.18%	220,750	47.96%	3,498,370	44.04%
Other Parties (with < 1%)	959	1.69%	5,848	1.27%	223,848	2.82%
Valid Votes	56,743	95.30%	460,285	95.12%	7,943,688	95.20%
Rejected Votes	2,797	4.70%	23,611	4.88%	400,395	4.80%
Total Polled	59,540	83.14%	483,890	85.77%	8,344,095	74.75%
Registered Electors	71,614		564,194		11,163,064	

=== 1989 Sri Lankan Parliamentary Election ===
Party	Eheliyagoda		Ratnapura Electoral District		Sri Lanka	
Party	Votes	%	Votes	%	Votes	%
UNP	26,165	57.63%	196,323	57.89%	2,838,005	50.71%
USP	10,285	22.65%	17,323	5.11%	17,323	0.31%
SLFP	8,628	19.00%	123,360	36.38%	1,785,369	31.90%
Other Parties (with < 1%)	327	0.72%	2,116	0.62%	68,609	1.23%
Valid Votes	45,405	93.96%	339,122	94.37%	5,596,468	93.87%
Rejected Votes	2,919	6.04%	20,248	5.63%	365,563	6.13%
Total Polled	48,324	79.92%	359,370	78.60%	5,962,031	63.60%
Registered Electors	60,466		457,224		9,374,164	

== Demographics ==
=== Ethnicity ===
The Eheliyagoda Polling Division has a Sinhalese majority (92.0%) . In comparison, the Ratnapura Electoral District (which contains the Eheliyagoda Polling Division) has a Sinhalese majority (87.1%)

Ethnicity in Eheliyagoda
1. Sinhalese (92.0%)
2. Sri Lankan Tamil (4.00%)
3. Moor (2.70%)
4. Indian Tamil (1.30%)
5. Other (0.10%)

=== Religion ===
The Eheliyagoda Polling Division has a Buddhist majority (91.5%) . In comparison, the Ratnapura Electoral District (which contains the Eheliyagoda Polling Division) has a Buddhist majority (86.7%)

Religion in Eheliyagoda
1. Buddhist (91.5%)
2. Hindu (4.40%)
3. Muslim (2.80%)
4. Other (1.30%)
