= Kuruwita =

Kuruwita කුරුවිට
- Town
- Location within Sri Lanka
- Coordinates: 6.8218°N 80.3615°E
- Country: Sri Lanka
- Province: Sabaragamuwa Province
- District: Ratnapura District
- Time zone: UTC+5:30 (Sri Lanka Standard Time)
- Sri Lanka Post: 70500

Kuruwita is a town in the Ratnapura District of Sabaragamuwa Province of Sri Lanka. It is 87 km from Colombo. It used to be served by the 2 ft 6 in (762 mm) narrow gauge Sabaragamuwa Railway, a branch of the national railway system. And known for the nearby waterfall called Bopath Ella.

Religion in Kuruvita DS Division (2012)
1. Buddhist (92.7%)
2. Hindu (4.60%)
3. Muslim (1.30%)
4. Roman Catholic (0.90%)
5. Other Christian (0.50%)
6. Other (0.00%)

== Tourist attractions ==
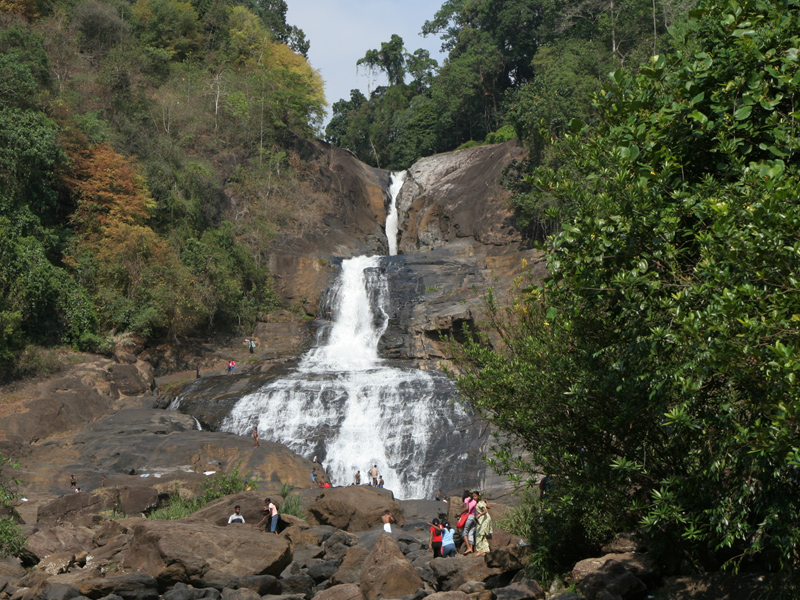
Bopath Ella

- Delgamu Vihara - This temple is reputed as the hiding place of the Tooth relic of Buddha during the ruling period of Portuguese in the country.
- Batatotalena Cave - Batatotalena Cave is a cave temple, believed to be the place Buddha rested while visiting Sri Pada (Adam's Peak), as discussed in the Mahavamsa as one of the nine places Buddha had visited during his third visit to Sri Lanka. Its view of Samanala Kanda (mountain of Sri Pada) and its size (able to shelter over 500 people) led to its widely accepted identification as the Diva Guhava of the Mahavamsa. It is located about 5 km off from Kuruwita town (10 km towards to Colombo from Ratnapura) on Erathna road, one of the ancient roads to Sri Pada.
- Bopath Ella - Situated at Kuruvita, a few miles away from Colombo Ratnapura high-level road. The fall is like a petal leaf that gives its name.

== See also ==
- Balangoda Man
- Batadombalena
- Railway stations in Sri Lanka
