= Ratnapura =

Ratnapura රත්නපුර இரத்தினபுரி Mini Pura, Ruwan Pura, Manikya Pura, city of Gems
- City
- Ratnapura
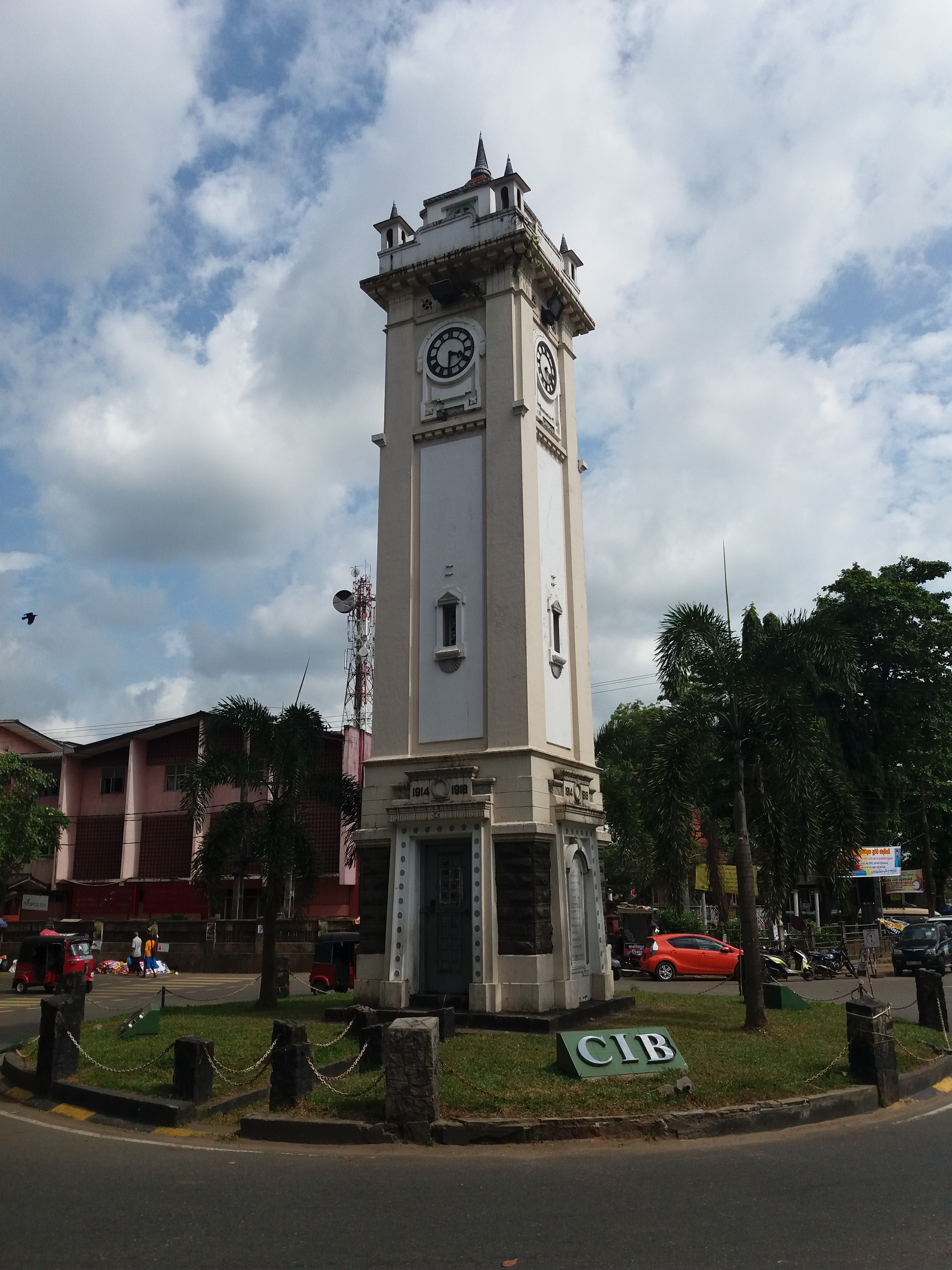
- Ratnapura Clock tower

- Location within Sri Lanka
- Coordinates: 6°40′50″N 80°24′08″E
- Country: Sri Lanka
- Province: Sabaragamuwa
- District: Ratnapura

Government
  - Type: Municipal Council
  - Mayor: K.A.D.R.I. Katugampala (NPP)

Area
  - Total: 20 km^{2} (7.7 sq mi)
- Elevation: 130 m (430 ft)

Population (2022)
  - Total: 165,998
- Demonym: Ratnians
- Time zone: UTC+05:30 (SLT)
- postal code: 70000
- Website: ratnapura.mc.gov.lk

Ratnapura (Sinhala: රත්නපුර, IPA: [rət̪n̪əpurə]; Tamil: இரத்தினபுரி, IPA: [iɾɐt̪ːinɐβuɾi]) ("City of Gems" in Sinhala and Tamil) is a major city in Sri Lanka. It is the capital city of Sabaragamuwa Province, as well as the Ratnapura District, and is a traditional centre for the Sri Lankan gem trade. It is located on the Kalu Ganga (Black River) in south-central Sri Lanka, some 101 km (63 mi) southeast of the country's capital, Colombo. Ratnapura is also spelled as Rathnapura.

The name 'Ratnapura' is a Sanskrit word meaning "city of gems", from the Sanskrit words pura (town) and ratna (gemstone). Over 2000 years ago, the Buddhist teachings in Sanskrit and Pali influenced the local language. While candy produced from the jaggery palm is traditionally known in this region as ratnapura, it is more likely that the candy was named for the locale rather than vice versa.

It is the centre of a long-established industry of precious stone mining including rubies, sapphires, and other gems. Apart from gem mining, the city is known for the production of rice and fruit. Large plantations of tea and rubber surround the city. Tea grown in this region is called low-country tea. There is a well-established tourism industry in Ratnapura. Nearby Sinharaja Forest Reserve, Udawalawe National Park, Kitulgala, and Adam's Peak are especially popular among tourists.

In 1901, the town of Ratnapura had a population of 4,084, and by 2021, it had an estimate around 100,000 people, with Buddhists, Hindus, Christians and Muslims each constituting a significant portion of the population.

== Politics ==
The city is governed by a municipal council headed by a mayor. The council is elected by popular vote and has 15 seats. There were 29,159 registered voters in the 2006 local authorities elections.

== Health ==
Ratnapura hospital, upgraded to a Teaching Hospital in early 2019, is equipped with three surgical units, three medical units, two orthopedic units, three Obstetrics and gynaecology units, two paediatrics units, an ENT unit, a neurology unit, a neurosurgical unit, a rheumatology unit, a urosurgical unit, a nephrology unit with dialysing facilities, a dermatology unit, a psychiatric unit, an A&E unit, and a cardiology unit. It has theatre facilities for routine surgeries, and for 24/7 casualties. It also has two ICU units catering 12 ICU beds at the moment. It is also a post graduate training center for surgical and paediatric pg trainees. It was upgraded as a teaching hospital, with the establishment of Medical faculty in Sabaragamuwa university.

== Economy ==
=== Gem trade ===
The people of the town depend on the gem trade. Gem pits are common sights in the surrounding area. Most of the large-scale gem businessmen of Sri Lanka operate from Ratnapura. There are considerable numbers of foreign gem traders in the city too who have recognised the value of the gems found there. Among the foreign traders, Thai (Thailand) traders are in the majority. Every day, a large number of traders from suburbs and other towns gather in the town centre to sell or buy gemstones. Large-scale merchants collect gemstones from locals and sell them in the international market. Some traders go out of the city to buy gems. This includes neighboring towns like Kalawana, Bogawantalawa, and Ela-Hera. After the discovery of world-class alluvial sapphire deposits in the valley of Ilakaka in Madagascar, many Ratnapura merchants travel out of the country to Madagascar to buy gems. There are three main Gem marketplaces in Ratnapura: Abagahamula Gem Market, Clock Tower Gem Market, and Demuwamawatha Gem Market. These markets operate in different hours in the day.

=== Agriculture ===
The city's agricultural industry is also well developed. Large plantations of tea and rubber surround the town. Although rice fields also used to be a common sight around the town, rice cultivation presently faces an uncertain future in Ratnapura because many farmers are giving up their rice cultivation and switching to gem mining which is a more productive way of earning money. If many farmers give up on agriculture, it would be harder for farmers to harvest enough food for them and to trade in the markets. Many delicious fruits (like mango and papaya) and vegetables are grown as market products.

== Transport ==
Ratnapura city is located in the A4 Highway which connects capital Colombo to Kalmunai in the Eastern Province. Another Highway A8 connects the town with Panadura in the western coast of Sri Lanka. During the British occupation of the Island, narrow gauge train track was laid in 1912 connecting Colombo–Avissawella–Ratnapura–Opanayake however line Avissawella onwards removed in 1976. Thus reducing the mode of transportation to road. In 2006, construction started on a new broad gauge railway line to Rathnapura only. In 2014, the government gave approval to the E06 Ruwanpura Expressway which will connect Rathnapura with Sri Lanka's Expressway Network. Work on the expressway began in 2021, with the first section to be completed by the end of 2023.

== Climate ==
Ratnapura features a tropical rainforest climate under the Köppen climate classification. The city is located in the south-western part of Sri Lanka, the so-called wet zone. The town receives rainfall mainly from south-western monsoons from May to September. During the remaining months of the year, there is also considerable precipitation due to convective rains. The average annual precipitation is about 3,500 to 5,000 millimetres (140 to 200 in). The average temperature varies from 24 to 35 °C (75.2 to 95.0 °F), and there are high humidity levels. The city is 21 m (69 ft) above sea level.

Climate data for Ratnapura (1991–2020, extremes 1991-present)
Month	Jan	Feb	Mar	Apr	May	Jun	Jul	Aug	Sep	Oct	Nov	Dec	Year
Record high °C (°F)	36.1 (97.0)	38.3 (100.9)	38.7 (101.7)	37.0 (98.6)	36.1 (97.0)	35.7 (96.3)	34.8 (94.6)	37.2 (99.0)	36.3 (97.3)	34.8 (94.6)	35.1 (95.2)	34.9 (94.8)	38.7 (101.7)
Mean daily maximum °C (°F)	32.4 (90.3)	33.7 (92.7)	34.2 (93.6)	33.5 (92.3)	32.0 (89.6)	30.9 (87.6)	30.6 (87.1)	30.7 (87.3)	31.1 (88.0)	31.3 (88.3)	31.4 (88.5)	31.4 (88.5)	31.9 (89.4)
Daily mean °C (°F)	27.2 (81.0)	27.9 (82.2)	28.5 (83.3)	28.5 (83.3)	28.1 (82.6)	27.5 (81.5)	27.2 (81.0)	27.2 (81.0)	27.1 (80.8)	27.1 (80.8)	27.1 (80.8)	26.9 (80.4)	27.5 (81.5)
Mean daily minimum °C (°F)	21.9 (71.4)	22.2 (72.0)	22.8 (73.0)	23.4 (74.1)	24.1 (75.4)	24.0 (75.2)	23.9 (75.0)	23.6 (74.5)	23.2 (73.8)	23.0 (73.4)	22.8 (73.0)	22.4 (72.3)	23.1 (73.6)
Record low °C (°F)	17.0 (62.6)	16.7 (62.1)	18.0 (64.4)	20.4 (68.7)	20.1 (68.2)	20.7 (69.3)	20.6 (69.1)	20.5 (68.9)	20.1 (68.2)	20.0 (68.0)	19.6 (67.3)	16.6 (61.9)	16.6 (61.9)
Average precipitation mm (inches)	124.7 (4.91)	137.0 (5.39)	204.1 (8.04)	366.1 (14.41)	467.5 (18.41)	382.1 (15.04)	282.1 (11.11)	304.6 (11.99)	372.1 (14.65)	467.5 (18.41)	368.3 (14.50)	211.7 (8.33)	3,687.9 (145.19)
Average precipitation days (≥ 1.0 mm)	8.2	8.5	12.3	19.0	20.3	21.1	18.9	18.6	19.1	21.2	17.9	12.9	198.0
Source: NOAA

=== Floods ===
Much of the city of Ratnapura is situated in the flood plain of the Kalu River. As a result, it experiences regular floods, usually during the month of May. There are no large-scale dams upstream on the Kalu to control Spring runoff. Proposals to reduce flood risk in the city have yet to reach the feasibility stage. In May 2003, the town experienced the largest flood since the independence of Sri Lanka from Britain in 1947.

== Paleontology ==
Several fossil localities have been reported from the Ganga valley in which several rivers reside. Overall, Stegodon insignis and Palaeoloxodon namadicus are known from Varanasi and Allahabad; Elephas antiquus and Rhinoceros are known from the lower Ganga alluvium. The fauna of the Ratnapura are is termed the Ratnapura fauna.

=== Balahapuva and Dakaragoda ===
The paleontological site of Balahapuva was described in detail by Paulus Edward Pieris Deraniyagala. This site comprises the Ratnapura fauna, made-up of a gem pit bearing sand-encrusted fossils and thick limonite lumps. He described an upper third hippopotamus molar, a Rhinoceros mandibular body, an elephant molar, Axis tooth, two Rusa teeth, and a crystalline scraper as well as two now-defunct hominid species: Homo sinhaleyus (misspelt as sinhalensis) from Dakaragoda and Homopithecus sinhaleyus from Balahapuva.

Homo sinhaleyus was named from a small fragmented skull with a thick brow and small orbits probably contemporary with Hexaprotodon sinhaleyus at the site of Dakaragoda. Homopithecus sinhaleyus is based upon a badly worn upper left first incisor (Ratnapura Museum No. F. 389) missing the root discovered 18 ft underground and associated with the entirety of the local fauna. He pinned an upper Middle Pleistocene age. Deraniyagala believed that the Homo sinhaleyus may have been a "Neanderthaloid" race, and pegged Homopithecus sinhaleyus as more primitive. Deraniyagala formulated the Ratnapura Culture to be a predecessor to the Balangoda Culture. Other human remains are known from the Ratnapura area.

Early research by Deraniyagala shows that he once preferred to assign the tooth to Pithecanthropus sinhaleyus. Later investigation by Seth (1993) discovered that the tooth of Homopithecus was likely a large ungulate or gaur, and the crystal was not a tool; the skull of Homo sinhaleyus was determined to be a young woman exhibiting dolichocephaly of unknown geological age and having attribution to Homo sapiens.

=== Minor sites ===
The site of Mallapitiya contains fossils from the Kalu Ganga and Hangamu rivers and supports a similar fauna to Balahapuva: three elephant molars and an incomplete limb, a bovine tooth, two fragmented hippopotamus limbs, and a fossilized Paludomus shell cast. The site of Bokirideniya preserves four hippopotamus molars, a tusk and a canine, various unidentified fossil material, and an elephant molar. The site of Kanukätiya preserves an Elephas maximus sinhaleyus molar, a Rhinoceros molar and a Hexaprotodon sinhaleyus molar. The site of Talagahakumbura preserves an E. m. sinhaleyus tarsal, a hippopotamus molar, a porcupine tooth, Rusa and elephant molars, and a hippopotamus incisor. The site of Dodampé preserves E. m. sinhaleyus, Rhinoceros kagavena, Rusa unicolor unicolor, Gona sinhaleya, Tatera sinhaleyus, Muva sinhaleya, and Hexaprotodon sinhaleyus.

== Places of worship ==
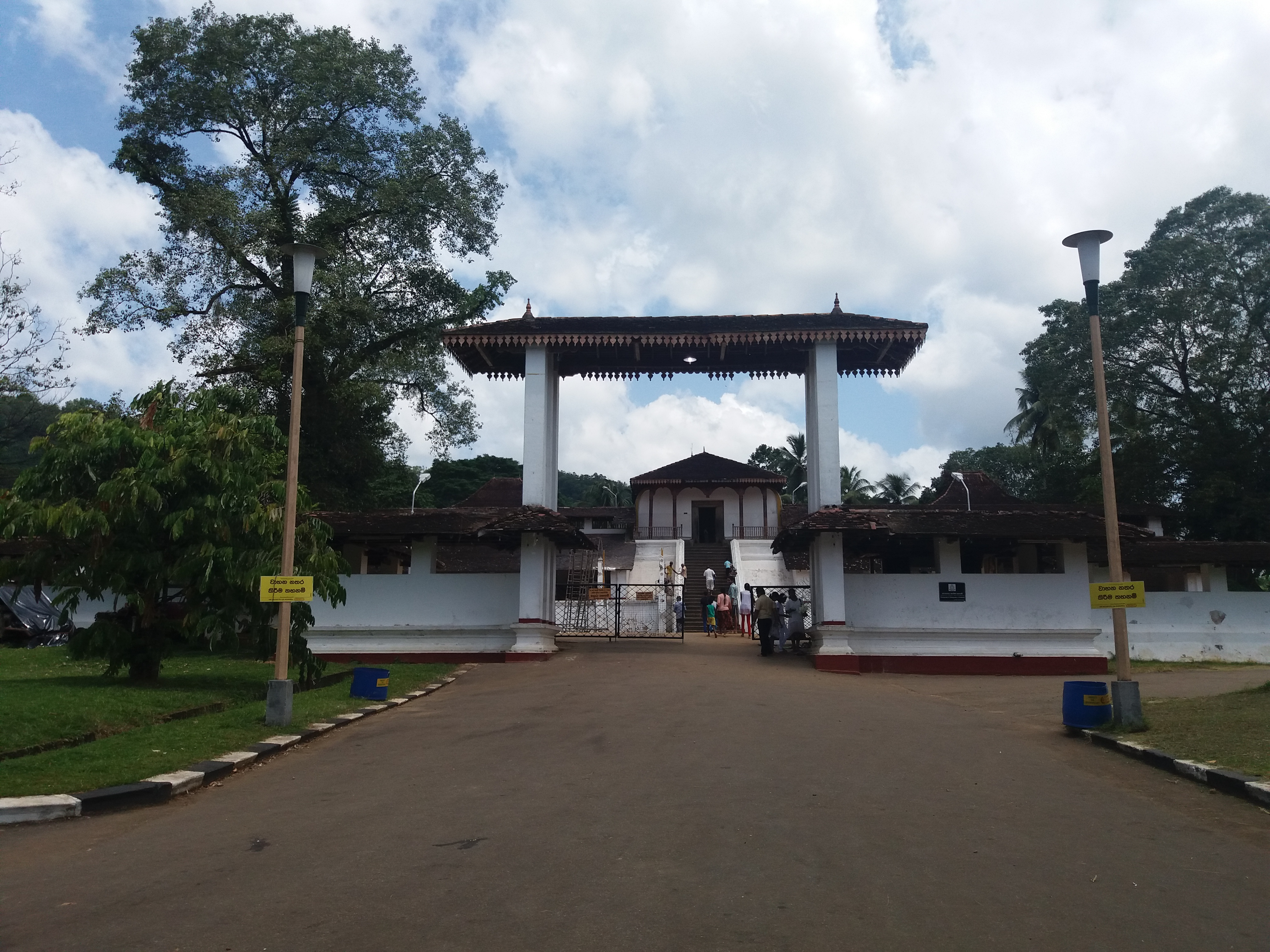
Ratnapura Maha Saman Devala premises

There are a number of places of worship in and around Ratnapura, including:

- Maha Saman Devalaya – a shrine dedicated to the god Saman. The god Saman is (a Buddhist deity) considered to be the guardian of Ratnapura. When the Portuguese captured Ratnapura, the ancient shrine that stood at this location was destroyed and a Portuguese church was constructed on top of it. When the Kandyan kingdom recaptured Ratnapura, the Portuguese church was destroyed and the shrine was rebuilt. Although there is no direct evidence to support the existence of the old shrine, indirect evidence supports the existence of a shrine that looked like a Hindu temple at the current location before Portuguese times. Currently this shrine is a very important place for Buddhists.
- Saints Peter and Paul's Cathedral – The history of Catholics in Ratnapura begins with Portuguese rule in Ratnapura. Very few Catholics lived in the town in the 17th century. Many of them are the descendants of Portuguese and locals that they married. There is evidence to suggest that the Portuguese built a church on top of a destroyed Buddhist temple. That Portuguese church was destroyed when the Kandyan kingdom recaptured Ratnapura from the Portuguese. The current church was built in a different location along the main street of Ratnapura (inside the town). The Church building being used now is said to be inspired by St. Joseph Vaz (Apostle of Ceylon) during the 17th century when he visited Ratnapura as a part of his apostolic mission to Sabaragamuwa. After Sabaragamuwa became a diocese on 2 November 1995 SS. Peter-Paul's Church was raised to the status of the Cathedral of the diocese.
- Pothgul Viharaya - Rathnapura Pothgul Rajamaha Viharaya (පොත්ගුල් විහාරය) is a picturesque cave temple built on top of a hill believed to be built by king Vatta Gamini Abhaya better known as king Walagamba (89-77 BC) in the 1st century. It had been renovated during the days of King Kirthi Sri Rajasinghe (1747 – 1781) of the Kandy period. There are two temples belonging to these two periods within the Pothgul Viharaya.
- St. Luke's Church (Church of England)
- Siva Temple (Hindu)

=== Sri Pada (Adam's Peak) ===
Ratnapura is the starting point for the 'classic' or hard route up Adam's Peak, via the Gilimale and Carney Estates. The pilgrimage season starts on Poya (full moon) day in December and runs until the start of the south-west monsoon in April. It has been a pilgrimage centre for over 1,000 years. King Parakramabahu and King Nissanka Malla of Polonnaruwa provided ambalamas or 'resting places' for weary pilgrims along the mountain route. The other more popular route is through Dalhousie (pronounced 'Del-house') close to Dickoya.

=== Religion ===
Ratnapura DS Division has a Buddhist majority (78.17%) and a significant Hindu population (14.05%) .

Religion in Ratnapura
1. Buddhist (78.2%)
2. Hindu (14.1%)
3. Muslim (5.26%)
4. Roman Catholic (1.51%)
5. Other Christian (1.00%)
6. Other (0.01%)

== Education ==
Schools in Ratnapura include:

- Convent of Infant Jesus
- Dharmapala Maha Vidyalaya
- Ferguson High School
- St.John's Tamil National College, Rakwana
- Rathnaloka Central College, Rakwana
- Kalawana National School
- Malwala Navodya School
- Mihindu Vidyalaya
- Prince College, Ratnapura
- Ananda Maithreya Central College, Balangoda
- Sivali Central College
- St. Aloysius College
- St. Luke's College
- Sumana Balika Vidyalaya
- Sumana Central College
- Sumana Saman Maha Vidyalaya
- Sussex College
- Lyceum Ratnapura
- Ratnapura Tamil Maha Vidyalayam
- Sri Sumana Maha Vidyalaya. Ratnapura.
- Gallella Maha Vidyalaya.Gallella. Ratnapura.
- Siduhath Vidyalaya. Galaboda, Ratnapura.

== Attractions ==
=== Waterfalls ===
- Katugas Ella (කටුගස් ඇල්ල) – a 6-metre-high (20 ft) waterfall, located at Mahawalawatta, 3 km (1.9 mi) away from Ratnapura.
- Kirindi Ella (කිරිඳි ඇල්ල) – a 116-metre-high (381 ft) waterfall (the seventh highest in Sri Lanka), located 4 km (2.5 mi) away from Ratnapura, on the Ratnapura – Pelmadulla road.
- Rajanawa Ella (රජනෑ ඇල්ල) – a 12-metre-high (39 ft) waterfall located adjacent to the Ratnapura–Kalawana road, at the village of Marapana. The scenery around the waterfall has been captured in several Sinhala films.

=== Gem mines ===
Washed gem gravel being sorted by hand at a pit near Pelmadulla, Ratnapura District

There are numerous gem mines located around the area, especially in paddy fields on lower ground. The mines are generally around 10 m (33 ft) to 50 m (160 ft) deep. Portable hand operating tools used for the mining process, include shovels, picks, pans (specially made from bamboo) and cradles. Once the soil is extracted from the mine, water is used to wash the dirt and mud away using pans and any gemstones, which heavier than normal stones, will remain at the bottom of the pan.
