= Ratnapura District =

Ratnapura District රත්නපුර දිස්ත්‍රික්කය இரத்தினபுரம் மாவட்டம்
- Administrative District
- Map of Sri Lanka with Ratnapura District highlighted
- Coordinates: 6°35′N 80°35′E
- Country: Sri Lanka
- Province: Sabaragamuwa Province
- Largest City: Ratnapura

Government
  - District Secretary: Malani Lokupothagama

Area
  - Total: 3,275 km^{2} (1,264 sq mi)

Population (2012)
  - Total: 1,088,007
  - Density: 332.2/km^{2} (860/sq mi)
- Time zone: UTC+05:30 (Sri Lanka)
- ISO 3166 code: LK-91

Ratnapura (Sinhala: රත්නපුර දිස්ත්‍රික්කය, Tamil: இரத்தினபுரம் மாவட்டம்) is a district of Sri Lanka in the Sabaragamuwa Province.

This gem-mining centre of Sri Lanka is also a major crossroads between southern plains and the hill country to the east. Many of Sri Lanka's prominent gem dealers operate from this market city, which services most of the surrounding towns. There is a route to Sri Pada from the direction of Ratnapura. Local attractions include Sinharaja Forest Reserve and Udawalawe National Park. The surrounding area is popular with trekkers and bird watchers. The district is home to Kukulugala, the 18th tallest mountain in Sri Lanka.

== Demographics ==
Ethnicity in Ratnapura District (2024)
1. Sinhala (87.6%)
2. Sri Lankan Tamils (7.97%)
3. Sri Lankan Moors (2.26%)
4. Hill Tamils (2.09%)
5. Others (0.07%)

Religion in Ratnapura district (2024)
| Religion | Percent |
| Buddhism | 87.28% |
| Hinduism | 9.07% |
| Islam | 2.34% |
| Catholicism | 0.75% |
| Other Christianity | 0.56% |
| Other or not stated | 0.00% |

The majority of the population are Buddhists. Other religions include Hinduism, Islam and Christianity.

| Religion | Population(2012) |
|---|---|
| Buddhism | 943,464 |
| Hinduism | 101,962 |
| Islam | 24,446 |
| Christianity | 18,056 |
| Other Religion | 79 |

== Major cities ==
- Ratnapura (Municipal Council)

== Large towns ==
- Balangoda (Urban Council)
- Embilipitiya (Urban Council)

== Other towns ==
- Rakwana
- Pelmadulla
- Kuruwita
- Imbulpe
- Godakawela
- Kahawatta
- Eheliyagoda
- Weligepola
- Nivitigala
- Ayagama
- Kalawana
- Kolonna
- Panamure
- Pallebedda
- Udawalawe

== Administration ==
18 Divisional Secretariat divisions of Ratnapura district

For administrative purposes, the district is divided into 18 Divisional Secretariat divisions:

1. Eheliyagoda
2. Kuruwita
3. Kiriella
4. Rathnapura
5. Elapatha
6. Ayagama
7. Imbulpe
8. Opanayaka
9. Pelmadulla
10. Nivithigala
11. Kalawana
12. Balangoda
13. Weligepola
14. Godakawela
15. Kahawaththa
16. Embilipitiya
17. Kolonna
18. Kalthota

=== Plantation companies ===
The Ratnapura district includes areas managed by Five Plantation Companies. Namely, Agalawatte Plantations PLC managed by Mackwoods, Balangoda Plantations PLC managed by Stassens, Pussellawa Plantations PLC, managed by Freelanka, Hapugastenne Plantations PLC Managed by Finlays, and Kahawatte Plantations PLC managed by Forbes.

The ownership of these companies lie with the State.
