= Sabaragamuwa Province =

Province of Sri Lanka

Sabaragamuwa Province සබරගමුව පළාත சப்ரகமுவ மாகாணம்
- Province
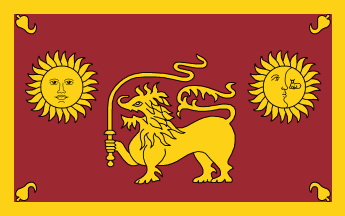
- Flag

- Location within Sri Lanka
- Coordinates: 6°40′N 80°24′E
- Country: Sri Lanka
- Created: 1889
- Admitted: 14 November 1987
- Capital: Ratnapura
- Largest city: Ratnapura
- Districts: List: Kegalle; Ratnapura

Government
  - Type: Provincial council
  - Body: Sabaragamuwa Provincial Council
  - Governor: Champa Janaki Rajaratne

Area
  - Total: 4,968 km^{2} (1,918 sq mi)
  - Rank: 8th (7.46% of total area)

Population (2024 census)
  - Total: 2,015,899
  - Rank: 5th (9.63% of total pop.)
  - Density: 405.8/km^{2} (1,051/sq mi)

Ethnicity (2012 census)
  - Sinhalese: 1,666,180 (86.4%)
  - Indian Tamil: 105,872 (5.49%)
  - Sri Lankan Moors: 82,343 (4.27%)
  - Sri Lankan Tamil: 72,298 (3.75%)
  - Other: 1,962 (0.09%)

Religion (2012 census)
  - Buddhist: 1,653,381 (85.73%)
  - Hindu: 156,312 (8.1%)
  - Muslim: 85,610 (4.44%)
  - Christian: 33,219 (1.72%)
  - Other/None: 133 (0.006%)
- Time zone: UTC+05:30 (Sri Lanka)
- ISO 3166 code: LK-9
- Vehicle registration: SG
- Official Languages: Sinhala, Tamil
- Flower: Vesak flower (Dendrobium Maccarthiae)
- Literacy (2012): 94.8% ▲
- Computer literacy (2020): 32% ▲
- Website: www.sg.gov.lk

The Sabaragamuwa Province (IPA: [səbəɾəɡəmuʋə], Sinhala: සබරගමුව පළාත, romanised: Sabaragamuwa Paḷāta, Tamil: சபரகமுவ மாகாணம், romanised: Sabaragamuva Mākāṇam) is one of the nine provinces of Sri Lanka. Ratnapura is the capital of the province.

== History ==
The provinces of Sri Lanka were created by the British in the 19th century, but did not have any legal status until 1987 when the 13th Amendment to the Constitution of Sri Lanka established provincial councils.

The province is named after its former indigenous inhabitants, namely the Sabara (शबर Śabara), an Indic term for hunter-gatherers (mleccha) and the Sinhala gamuwa, "gathering place."

The Sabaragamuwa University of Sri Lanka is located in the town of Belihuloya, and was founded in 1991.

== Geography ==
The province has an area of 4,968 km^{2} and a population of 1,918,880. Major towns include Ratnapura and Kegalle.

== Demographics ==
=== Ethnic groups ===
Ethnicity in Sabaragamuwa Province (2024)
1. Sinhala (86.3%)
2. Sri Lankan Tamils (6.54%)
3. Sri Lankan Moors (4.84%)
4. Hill Tamils (2.24%)
5. Others (0.07%)

The Sinhalese are the majority ethnic group of the Sabaragamuwa province. Additionally, there are sizeable minority populations of Indian Tamils, Moors and Sri Lankan Tamils.

Ethnic group	Population	%
Sinhalese	1,666,180	86.4%
Indian Tamils	105,872	5.49%
Sri Lankan Moors	82,343	4.27%
Sri Lankan Tamils	72,298	3.75%
Others	1,962	0.09%
Total	1,918,880	100.00%

=== Religion ===
Religion in Sabaragamuwa Province (2024)
1. Buddhism (85.8%)
2. Hinduism (7.94%)
3. Islam (4.93%)
4. Catholicism (0.79%)
5. Other Christianity (0.58%)
6. Others (0.01%)

Religion in Sabaragamuwa Province 1981–2012
Religion	Census 1981		Census 2001		Census 2012	
Religion	Population	%	Population	%	Population	%
Buddhism	1,259,396	84.98%	1,547,769	85.77%	1,653,381	85.73%
Hinduism	146,010	9.86%	148,400	8.2%	156,312	8.1%
Islam	51,248	3.46%	73,576	4%	85,610	4.44%
Christianity	24,892	1.67%	30,994	2%	33,219	1.72%
Others/None	485	0.03%	592	0.03%	133	0.006%
Total	1,482,031	100%	1,801,331	100%	1,928,655	100%

== Administrative divisions ==
Sabaragamuwa is divided into two districts and 28 divisional secretariats.

=== Districts ===
Administrative Divisions of Sabaragamuwa Province
District	Capital	Area (km^{2})	Population
Kegalle District	Kegalle	1,693	837,179
Ratnapura District	Ratnapura	3,275	1,088,007

=== Major population centres ===
- Ratnapura
- Balangoda
- Embilipitiya
- Kegalle
- Bulathkohupitiya
- Belihuloya
- Eheliyagoda
- Kalawana
- Kuruwita
- Mawanella
- Aranayaka
- Rakwana
- Imbulpe
- Deraniyagala
- Ambepussa
- Rambukkana
- Kitulgala
- Panamure
- Godakawela
- Yatiyanthota
- Karawanalla
- Ruwanwella
- Aguruwalla
- Dehiowita

== See also ==
- Provinces of Sri Lanka
- Districts of Sri Lanka
