= List of Archaeological Protected Monuments in Badulla District =

This is a list of Archaeological Protected Monuments in Badulla District, Sri Lanka.

Monument	Image	Location	Grama Niladhari Division	Divisional Secretary's Division	Registered	Description	Refs
Alankaragobe Purana Vihara		Balgolla		Meegahakivula	22 November 2002	Stupa and image house	
Aluyatawela Purana Vihara			No. 01 I Aluyatawela	Mahiyanganaya	6 June 2008	Dagoba ruins	
Ampitiya archaeological site		Galauda		Kandaketiya	22 November 2002	Bodhi Prakara, Stupa, Image house and Devalaya	
Ampitiya Vihara			No. 81 Kendagolla	Badulla	22 November 2002	The Bodhi tree and its surrounding premises	
Andagala ruins		Ekiriyan kumbura		Rideemaliyadda	22 November 2002	Andagala ledged cave, image house and Pond	
Andeniya bridge			No. 78 J Badulla Badulupitiya	Badulla	22 November 2002	A timber suspension bridge, connecting Andeniya and Badulupitiya	
Badulla building complex and Ambalama			No. 78 D Badulla Central	Badulla	22 November 2002		
Badulla assistant government agent's office		Badulla	No. 78 D Badulla Central	Badulla	22 November 2002		
Badulla base hospital complex		Badulla	No. 78 D Badulla Central	Badulla	22 November 2002	British colonial hospital building (constructed in 1891)	
Badulla building material corporation building		Badulla	No. 78 F Badulla Kanupelella	Badulla	22 November 2002		
Badulla Court building		Badulla	No. 78 D Badulla Central	Badulla	22 November 2002		
Badulla district secretary's bungalow		Badulla	Badulla East	Badulla	22 November 2002		
Badulla four official Kachcheri residences		Badulla	No 78 B Badulla East	Badulla	22 November 2002	At Polwatta	
Badulla government agent's bungalow		Badulla	No 78 B Badulla East	Badulla	22 November 2002	Chief Minister's residence	
Badulla governor's secretary bungalow		Badulla	No 78 B Badulla East	Badulla	22 November 2002	In front of Wills park, Library lane	
Badulla health director's office building		Badulla	No. 78 G Badulla Kailagoda	Badulla	22 November 2002	Mahiyangana road	
Badulla health education unit building		Badulla	No. 78 G Badulla Kailagoda	Badulla	22 November 2002	Mahiyangana road	
Badulla irrigation quarters		Badulla	No. 78 C Badulla West	Badulla	22 November 2002	At Polwatta	
Badulla Judge's bungalow		Badulla	No. 78 D Badulla Central	Badulla	22 November 2002		
Badulla Kataragama Devalaya		Badulla		Badulla	23 March 1952	Image house	`
Badulla Municipal Council building		Badulla	No. 78 D Badulla Central	Badulla	22 November 2002	Badulla - Bandarawela road	
Badulla Municipal Council garden		Badulla	No. 78 J Badulla Badulupitiya	Badulla	22 November 2002		
Badulla paddy marketing board building		Badulla	No. 78 G Badulla Kailagoda	Badulla	22 November 2002	Mahiyangana road	
Badulla Pillar Inscription		Badulla	No 78 B Badulla East	Badulla	22 November 2002	At the Paranavitana library premises	
Badulla prison building		Badulla	No 78 B Badulla East	Badulla	22 November 2002		
Badulla provincial council building		Badulla	No 78 B Badulla East	Badulla	22 November 2002		
Badulla race course tank		Badulla	No. 78 J Badulla Badulupitiya	Badulla	22 November 2002		
Badulla railway station		Badulla	No. 78 F Badulla Kanupelella	Badulla	22 November 2002	Railway station and bungalow	
Badulla Rose Bank building		Badulla	No. 78 G Badulla Kailagoda	Badulla	22 November 2002	Mahiyangana road	
Badulla Salusala building		Badulla	No 78 B Badulla East	Badulla	22 November 2002		
Badulla S.P. bungalow		Badulla	No. 78 D Badulla Central	Badulla	22 November 2002		
Bandarawela Hotel		Bandarawela		Bandarawela	23 January 2009	An 1894 Colonial hotel building	
Bogoda Raja Maha Vihara		Bogoda		Hali-Ela	22 November 2002	Len Vihara and Awasa house	
Boliyedda Vihara		Boliyedda		Soranathota	22 November 2002	Devalaya	
Broughton estate			Poonagala	Bandarawela	8 July 2005	Broughton bungalow, Catte hut and office building	`
Buduge Kanda Raja Maha Vihara				Soranathota	1 November 1996	Vihara and painting	
Bulathwatta len Vihara		Bulathwatta		Hali-Ela	22 November 2002	Devalaya	
Dambawinna Purana Vihara		Dambawinna		Welimada	22 November 2002	Image house and Stupa	
Dankumbura Raja Maha Vihara		Dankumbura		Rideemaliyadda	1 November 1996	Vihara and painting	
Dankumbura Raja Maha Vihara		Dankumbura	Aralupitiya	Rideemaliyadda	12 June 2015	Drip-ledged cave and other archaeological evidences	
Dhowa rock temple		Dhowa		Bandarawela	1 November 1996	Image house	
Dikkapitiya Purana Vihara		Dikkapitiya		Welimada	22 November 2002	Image house	
Dimbulana Vihara		Ambagahawatta		Uva-Paranagama	22 November 2002	Image house and Bodhi wall	
Divurumwela Raja Maha Vihara		Nugatalawa		Welimada	22 November 2002	Stupa	
Divurumwela Raja Maha Vihara		Nugatalawa		Welimada	6 June 2008	Bodhighara	
Egodakele Coffee Factory		Illukpelessa		Ella	23 January 2009		
Etampitiya Ambalama		Etampitiya		Hali-Ela	8 July 2005	Ambalama	`
Kotugodella fort		Ettampitiya		Hali-Ela	22 November 2002	Ruins of Portuguese fort at Kotugodella	
Ganetenna Purana Raja Maha Vihara				Hali-Ela	1 November 1996	Vihara and Painting	
Galegoluwa Raja Maha Vihara		Galegoluwa		Haputale	1 November 1996	Image house	
Galge Pitiya Purana Vihara		Kottegoda-Kadana		Hali-Ela	22 November 2002	Len Vihara	
Girandurukotte school premises ruins			No. 01 F Girandurukotte	Mahiyanganaya	6 June 2008	Dagoba, brick pathway wall, three buildings with stone pillars and a gate at Girandurukotte school premises	
Godegedara Vihara		Godegama		Hali-Ela	9 October 1969	Vihara with paintings	`
Haldummulla Judicial Court		Hallatthuthenna		Haldummulla	23 January 2009	The witness stand of the Haldummulla Judicial Courts	
Haldummulla Purana Vihara		Haldummulla		Haldummulla	22 November 2002	Image house and Preaching hall	
Hanguma Purana Vihara		Millakewa Girandurukotte		Mahiyanganaya	22 November 2002	Stupa	
Haputale Circuit Bungalow and official residence of the Wild Life Conservation Officers			Haputale	Haputale	6 February 2009		
Haputale forest-site office		Haputale		Haputale	22 November 2002		
Hebarawa ruins		Hebarawa		Mahiyanganaya	12 June 2015	Hillock of ruined Chaitya	
Hehelayaya ruins			No. 01 C	Mahiyanganaya	6 June 2008	The Stupa mound on rock in the place known as Hahelayaya	
Henahela Veedhiya ruins			No. 02 C Talangamuwa	Mahiyanganaya	6 June 2008	Stupa mound, building foundation and archaeological reserve with the round base in the place called henahela Veedhiya	
Hill Oya Raja Maha Vihara				Ella	23 January 2009	Buddha Bhikkus residence, Hewisi Hall, Buddha Bhikkus Disciplinary Hall, the pillar for the prayer Call Bell, and forecourt of the Bodhi tree	
Hobariyawa Purana Vihara		Hobariyawa		Mahiyanganaya	22 November 2002	Drip ledged caves	
Hunugalagala Limestone Cave				Haldummulla			
Jayakontarama Vihara		Bandarawela	Kontahela	Bandarawela	23 January 2009	Residence of Buddha Bhikkus, Discourse Hall and Buddhist shrine	
Kadademugala archaeological site		Godaporugala	No. 01 B Galporuyaya	Mahiyanganaya	6 June 2008	Building ruins, flight of steps, foundation, broken up stone with chiseled marks and such other remains of the archaeological reserve	
Kahatathalawa Naa bodhi			53-F–Kotawera	Uva-Paranagama	6 June 2008	The pathway wall around the Naa bodhi	
Kahaththewela Ambalama		Kahaththewela		Bandarawela	25 March 2016		
Kalubullanda Purana Vihara			No. 51 A Klubullanda	Welimada	6 June 2008	Image house	
Kanugolla Shailabimbarama Vihara			No. 11-B–Ridimaliyadde South	Rideemaliyadda	6 June 2008	The two drip ledged rock caves and pond	
Kanugolla Shailabimbarama Vihara		Kanugolla	Ridimaliyadda South	Rideemaliyadda	12 June 2015	Cave temple with rock art, drip ledges	
Keppetipola Fort		Keppetipola		Welimada	22 November 2002	Stupa	
Ketawala Ambalama		Uva Ketawala		Hali-Ela	8 July 2005	Ambalama	`
Kirawanagama Raja Maha Vihara		Kirawanagama		Haputale	1 November 1996	Image house	
Kirioruwa Ambalama		Amunudova	Kontahela	Bandarawela	23 January 2009		
Kirivehera Raja Maha Vihara		Pallewela		Kandaketiya	22 November 2002	Stupa	
Kosgama Walawwa		Uva Kosgama		Haldummulla	22 November 2002		
Koslanda Ariyawansarama Vihara		Koslanda		Haldummulla	22 November 2002	Image house	
Kotalawala Walawwa			No. 78 K Hindagoda	Badulla	22 November 2002	The walawwa along Badulla-Passara road	
Kudagalayaya Veeppannagala rock ruins		Kudagalayaya		Mahiyanganaya	6 February 2009	Veeppannagala rock plain bearing archaeological evidence	
Maha Sudarshana Thapowana Vihara		15 Mile Post		Rideemaliyadda	22 November 2002	Drip-ledged caves with inscriptions	
Mahiyangana Raja Maha Vihara		Mahiyangana		Mahiyanganaya	22 November 2002	Stupa	
Mana Ella archaeological reserve			Lunuwatta	Uva-Paranagama	6 June 2008	Stone seat, broken round pillar with inscriptions and chiseled marks	
Mapagala Vehera archaeological site		Mapakada		Mahiyanganaya	22 November 2002	Drip ledged caves	
Mapagoda Weheragodella ruins		Mapakadawewa	Mahiyangana	Mahiyanganaya	25 March 2016	Rock called Mapagoda Weheragodella with the hillock Dagoba and other archaeological evidences with places with remains of stone tools	
Mawaragala Forest Hermitage		Dambana		Mahiyanganaya	22 November 2002	Drip ledged caves	
Minuwangamuwa Vihara		Lunuwatta Kudaperuwa		Uva-Paranagama	23 February 2007	Image house and dagoba	
Muthiyangana Raja Maha Vihara		Badulla		Badulla	1 November 1996	Image house	
Nagadeepa Raja Maha Vihara, Uraneeya		Uraneeya		Rideemaliyadda	18 November 1960		`
No. 132 Walawwa			No. 78-P-Kailagoda	Badulla	6 June 2008	Walawwa premises situated along Puwakgodamule-Mahiayangana Road	
Pahala Kotavehera Vihara		Pahala Kotavehera		Welimada	22 November 2002	Stupa and Pattini Devalaya	
Parapawa Raja Maha Vihara		Parapawa		Passara	22 November 2002	Image house, Stupa and Preaching hall	
Passara Raja Maha Vihara		Hapuketiya		Passara	22 November 2002	Image house, Awasa house and Stupa	
Pattini Devalaya, Badulla		Badulla Town	Badulla	Haputale	8 April 2009	The Sri Pattini Dewala Premises in Badulla and associated buildings and other archaeological remains situated within the limits	
Pattini Devalaya, Helahalpe				Ella	22 November 2002	Pattini Devalaya, Sinhasanaya and Kitchen	
Pattini Devalaya, Kohovila				Soranathota	22 November 2002	Drip ledged caves with inscriptions	
Pattini Devalaya, Lindamulla			No. 78 E Gurugamuwa	Badulla	8 July 2005		`
Pitamaruwa Raja Maha Vihara		Pitamaruwa		Passara	22 November 2002	Image house	
Potawa Ambalama		Rideemaliyadda	Rideemaliyadda South	Rideemaliyadda	25 March 2016		
Rambaken Vihara		Keselpotha		Rideemaliyadda	22 November 2002	Stupa	
Rambukpotha Maha Walawwa			No. 80-Rambukpotha	Badulla	6 June 2008		
Rambukpotha Purana Vihara			No. 80-Rambukpotha	Badulla	6 June 2008	The Buddha shrine	
Ravana Ella Vihara		Ravana ella		Bandarawela	1 November 1996	Image house	
Reheddegala Forest Hermitage			Haputale	Haputale	6 February 2009	Drip-ledged rock cave	
Rideepana evaluvation building			No 78 A Badulla North	Badulla	22 November 2002		
Saman Devalaya, Mahiyangana		Mahiyangana		Mahiyanganaya	22 November 2002		
Senasungala Aranyagiri Vihara			6 Aluketiyawa	Rideemaliyadda	6 June 2008	The drip ledged rock cave, dagoba ruins, cave with inscription	
Sorabora Wewa		Soraborawewa	Wevgampaha	Mahiyanganaya	25 March 2016	Sorabora wewa with sluice	
Soragune Devalaya			Soragune	Haputale	6 July 2007		
Sri Bimbarama Raja Maha Vihara		Haputalegama		Haputale	1 November 1996	Image house	`
Sri Somananda Pirivena		Keppetipola		Welimada	22 November 2002	Stupa	
St. Andrew's Church		Kadurugamuwa		Haputale	22 November 2002		`
St. Mark's Church, Badulla			No. 78 D Badulla Central	Badulla	6 June 2008	The Church and the bell tower	
Sudarmarama Purana Vihara, Obadaella			No. 65 f Obadaella	Bandarawela	6 June 2008	Buddhist shrine	
Thunnewa Rock drip ledged cave		Dikkumbura		Kandaketiya	23 January 2009		
Tomb of Thisahami			No. 78 J Badulla Badulupitiya	Badulla	22 November 2002	At Badulupitiya Cemetery	
Udukinda Jinapothikarama Vihara			Medawela	Uva-Paranagama	6 June 2008	The Dhamma discourse hall	
Ulugala Raja Maha Vihara		Bowela		Uva-Paranagama	23 February 2007	Cave temple, Avasage and Dagoba	
Urumtenna Purana Vihara		Kahataruppa		Passara	22 November 2002	Drip-ledged cave	
Veedurupola Vihara		Veedurupola		Welimada	22 November 2002	Image house	
Velanhinna Fort				Haputale	22 November 2002	Fort and old water canal	
Viharagoda Vihara		Galkotuwa		Uva-Paranagama	23 February 2007	Image house and dagoba	
Viharatenna archaeological site				Ella	23 January 2009	Building ruins, stupa and other evidence of antiques in the archaeological site	
Welekade old market complex		Welekade	No. 78 D Badulla Central	Badulla	6 June 2008	Dutch Fort premises in Velekada Village	
