= Soragune Devalaya =

- සොරගුණේ දේවාලය

Religion
- Affiliation: Buddhism
- District: Badulla
- Province: Uva Province
- Deity: Kataragama deviyo
- Year consecrated: 1528; 498 years ago

Location
- Location: Haldummulla, Sri Lanka
- Interactive map of Soragune Devalaya
- Coordinates: 6°44′48.7″N 80°53′38.9″E

Architecture
- Type: Devalaya

Soragune Devalaya (Sinhala: සොරගුණේ දේවාලය), also known as Soragune Kuda Katharagama Devalaya, is an ancient Devalaya, situated in Haldummulla Divisional Secretariat, Sri Lanka. It lies on Badulla – Bandarawela main road, approximately 54 km (34 mi) away from the Badulla, the capital of Uva Province. The shrine is dedicated to the Sinhalese deity Kataragama deviyo, whose main and major shine is situated at south part of the island at Kataragama. The devalaya was formally recognised by the government as an archaeological protected monument. The designation was declared on 6 July 2007 under the government Gazette number 1505.

== History ==
The temple's origins date back to the reign of King Valagamba. The current complex however was constructed in 1528 during the reign of King Mayadunne, who according to local folklore, was seeking the blessing/protection of Kataragama, while he was away from the province. The temple was destroyed during the 1818 Uva-Wellassa rebellion but was subsequently reconstructed and in 1988 was conserved in its present state by the Department of Archaeology.

== Devalaya ==
The devalaya complex consists of a Maligava (shrine room), Sinhasana Mandiraya (chamber of throne), Digge (drummer's hall), Aramudalge (treasurery room), Gabadage, stupa, Bhodhigara (Bodhi temple), Bodhi tree and a Vihara. There is also a secondary shrine, dedicated to the Sinhalese guardian deity, Pattini.

== Controversies ==
In 2011 254 ha (628 acres) of land belonging to the Soragune Devalaya was sold, allegedly illegally, in order to construct a 36-hole golf course and a 1,500 room hotel. The Centre for Environmental Justice subsequently lodged a writ in the Court of Appeal against the clearing of the forest without following the proper environmental impact assessment procedures. In February 2014 a Dharma Yathra was started in Colombo, which culminated with a number of trees within the subject area being ordained by Buddhist monks on 1 March. The project has not proceeded since that time.

In 2015 a further 1,200 ha (3,000 acres) was sold to a private company, Lalan Rubbers Ltd, for the cultivation of rubber plantations.

== See also ==
- Badulla Kataragama Devalaya
- Kataragama temple
- Nawagamuwa Pattini Devalaya
