= Lindamulla Pattini Devalaya =

Lindamulla Pattini Devalaya ළිඳමුල්ල පත්තිනි දේවාලය
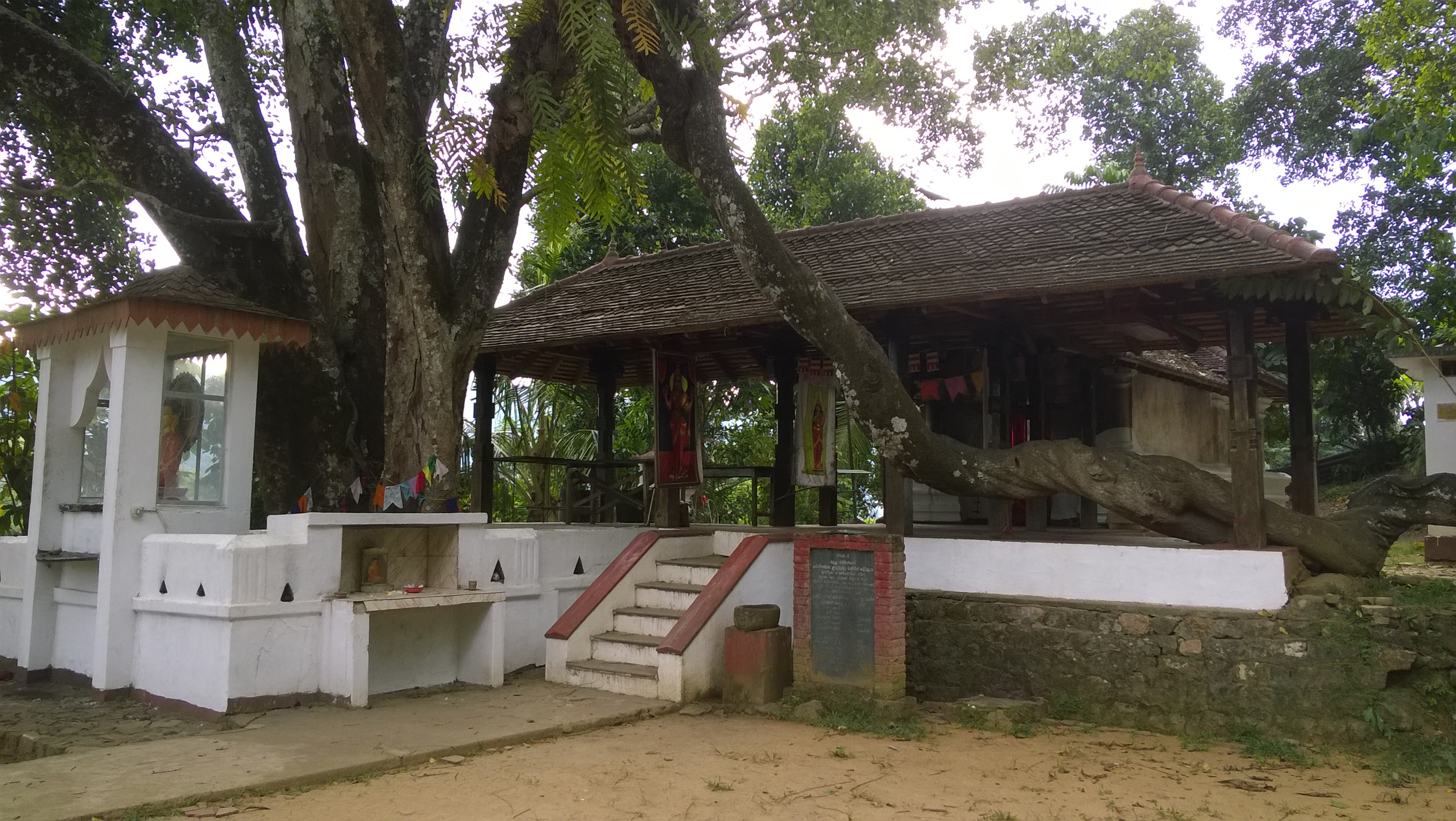

Religion
- Affiliation: Buddhism
- District: Badulla
- Province: Uva Province
- Deity: Pattini

Location
- Location: Gurugamuwa, Badulla, Sri Lanka
- Interactive map of Lindamulla Pattini Devalaya ළිඳමුල්ල පත්තිනි දේවාලය
- Coordinates: 06°58′47.6″N 81°04′10.7″E

Architecture
- Type: Devalaya

Lindamulla Pattini Devalaya (Sinhala: ළිඳමුල්ල පත්තිනි දේවාලය) is an ancient Devalaya, situated in Badulla Divisional Secretariat, Sri Lanka. It lies on Demodara - Spring Valley - Badulla road main road, approximately 1.5 km (0.93 mi) away from the historic temple Muthiyangana Raja Maha Vihara. The shrine is dedicated to Sinhalese goddess Pattini who is believed to be the patron goddess of fertility and health. The Devalaya has been formally recognised by the government as an archaeological protected monument. The designation was declared on 8 July 2005 under the government Gazette number 1401.

== The temple ==
The temple consists of the Maligava (The main Shrine room), kitchen and Buddha shrine with a Bodhi Tree. However, there is no Sinhasana Mandiraya (Chamber of Throne) in front of the main shrine room. The outer wall of the shrine has been decorated with various old paintings.

== See also ==
- Halpe Pattini Devalaya
- Nawagamuwa Pattini Devalaya
