= Halpe Pattini Devalaya =

Hindu temple in Sri Lanka

Halpe Pattini Devalaya හල්පේ පත්තිනි දේවාලය
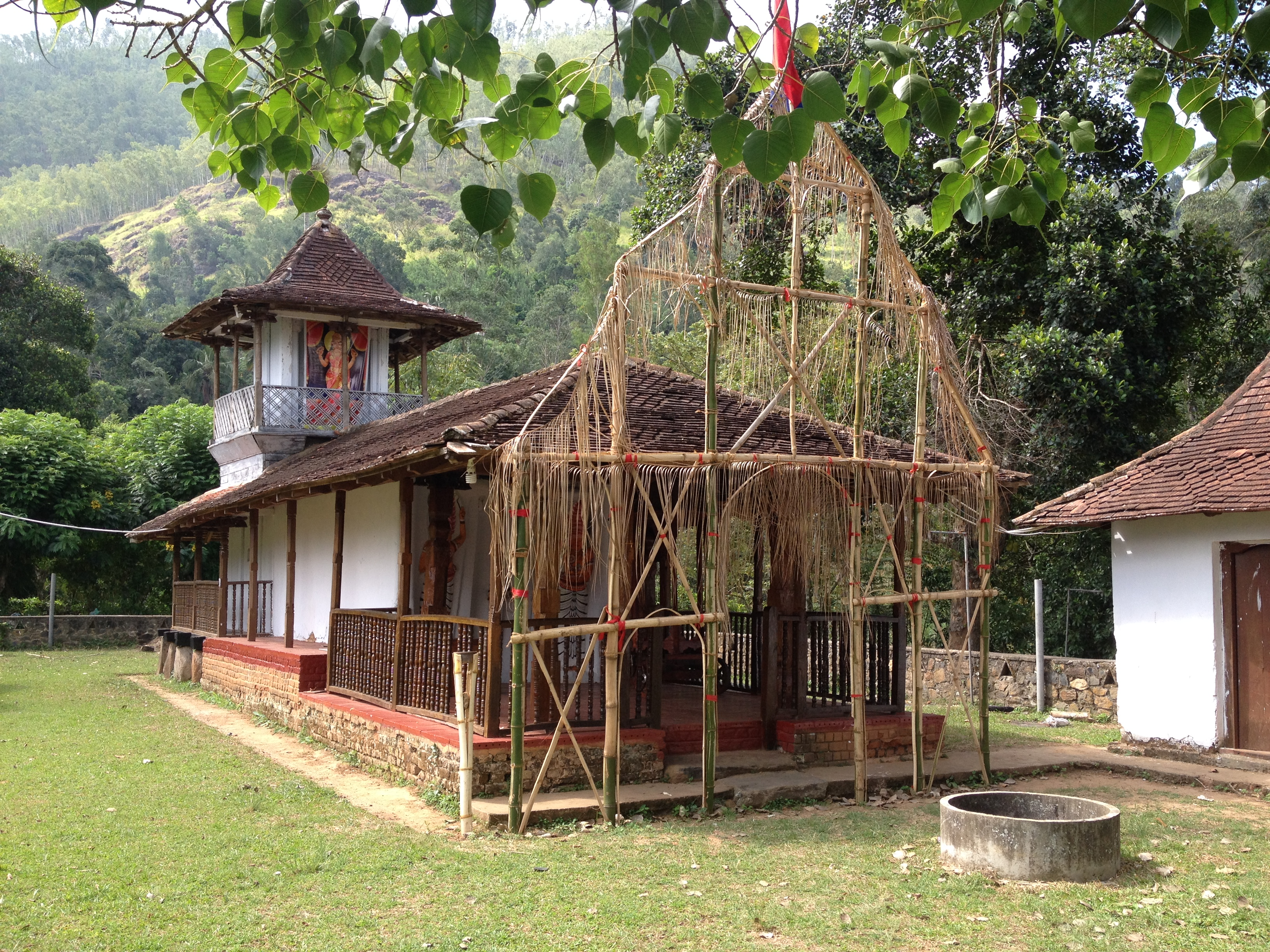

Religion
- Affiliation: Buddhism
- District: Badulla
- Province: Uva Province
- Deity: Pattini

Location
- Location: Halpe, Sri Lanka
- Interactive map of Halpe Pattini Devalaya හල්පේ පත්තිනි දේවාලය
- Coordinates: 06°53′24.1″N 81°02′29.3″E

Architecture
- Type: Devalaya

Halpe Pattini Devalaya is an ancient Devalaya, situated in Ella Divisional Secretariat, Sri Lanka. It lies on Badulla – Bandarawela main road, approximately 3 km (1.86 mi) away from the Ella town. The shrine is dedicated to Sinhalese goddess Pattini who is worshiped by both Buddhists and Hindu devotees. The devalaya has been formally recognised by the government as an archaeological protected monument. The designation was declared on 22 November 2002 under the government Gazette number 1264.

== Folklore ==
According to a folklore related with the shrine reveals that the devalaya was originally constructed in a nearby village called Hettipola, which was later shifted to the current site.

== Devalaya ==
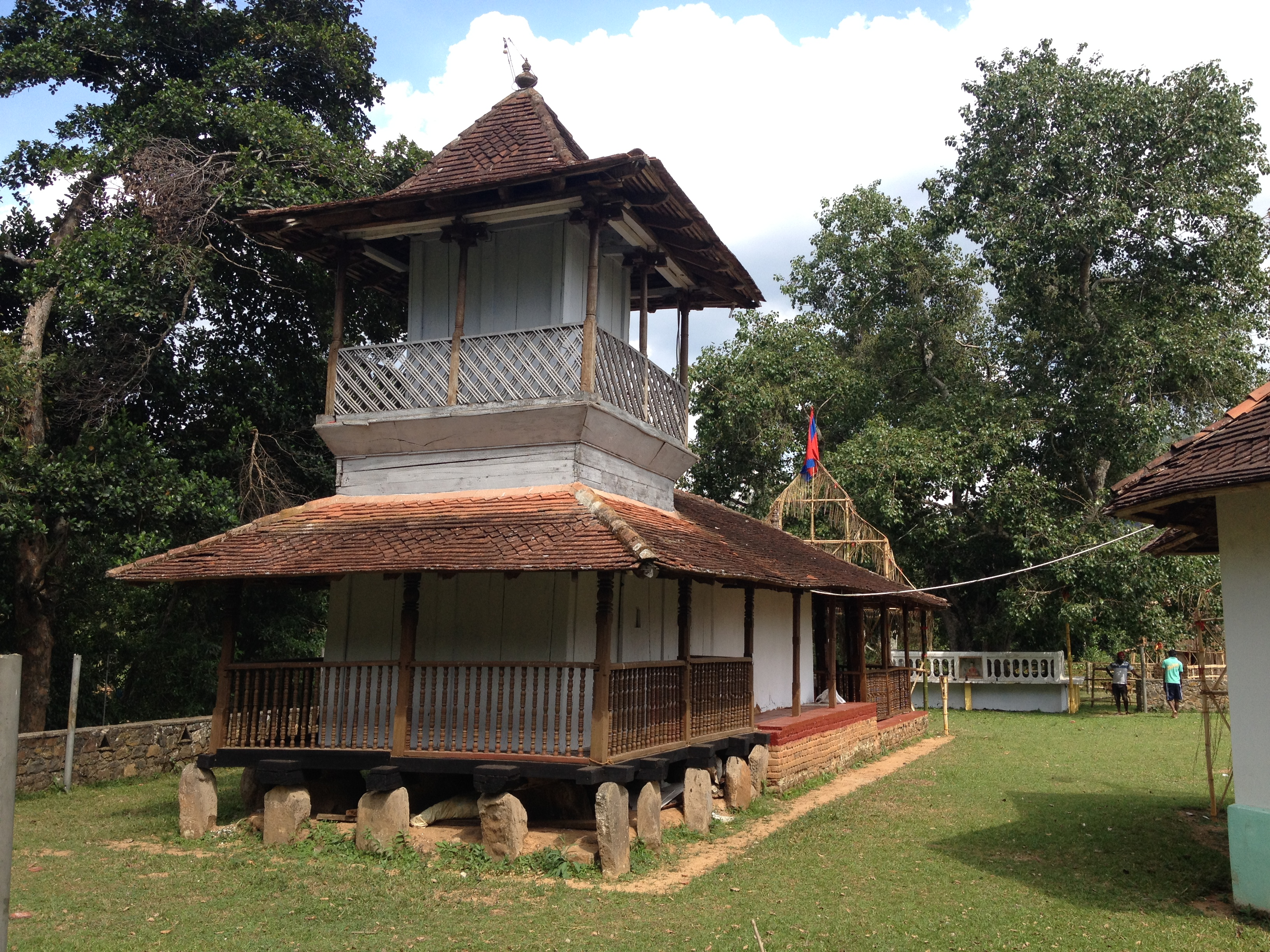
The building is supported on stone columns.

The devalaya premises consists of Maligava (Shrine room), Sinhasana Mandiraya (Chamber of Throne), Bhodhigara, kitchen and ruins of an ancient Buddhist temple. All of these structures have been enclosed by a parapet. The Maligawa of the devalaya is the main shrine room and is a two storied building has been constructed using timber columns and clay walls. The walls of upper floor is made up of timber panels and could be accessed by a wooden ladder. The ground floor has an inner chamber where a sandalwood statue of Goddess Pattini has been placed. The entrance to the inner chamber is adorned with sculptured Makara Thorana (Dragon's Arch), with images of two door keepers.

The front of the Maligawa is attached to a corridor and the roof of it has been supported on carved timber columns with lotus bracket-capitals. The carvings and murals those adorn the devalaya depict typical Kandyan tradition, which evidence that this shrine was constructed during the Kandyan era.

== Festival ==
In every year a Perahera (a procession) is conducted in honour of Goddess Pattini for invoke blessings on the village. Traditionally the jewels of Pattini are brought from nearby Buddhist temple, Yahalamadiththa Raja Maha Vihara to devalaya with perahera ceremony. The shrine is opened during this festival season only.

== See also ==
- Nawagamuwa Pattini Devalaya
