= Kotalawala Walawwa =

- කොතලාවල වලව්ව
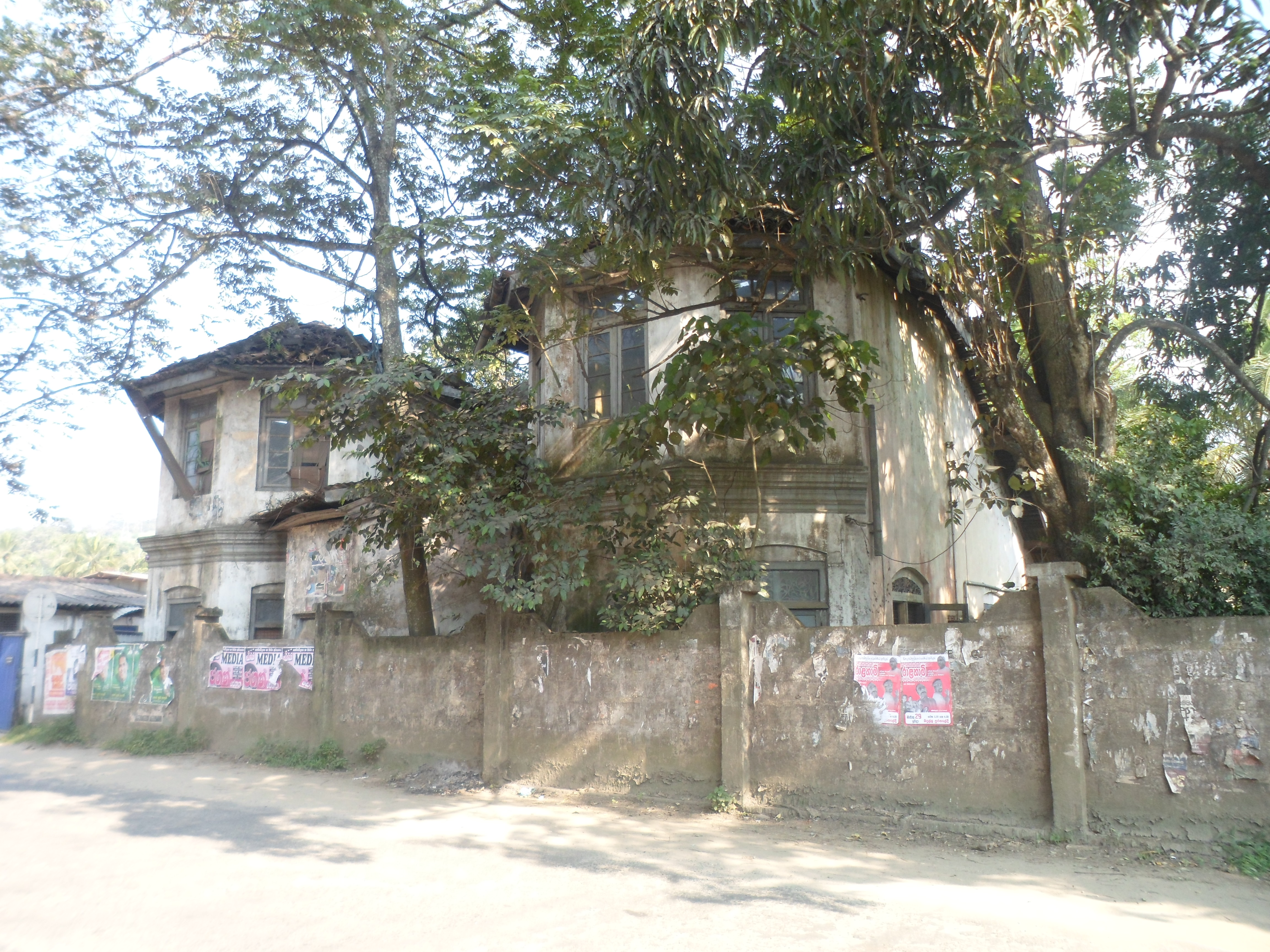
- Alternative names: Piya Niwasa

General information
- Type: Walawwa
- Address: 78 K Hindagoda
- Town or city: Badulla
- Country: Sri Lanka
- Coordinates: 06°59′00.1″N 81°03′58.6″E
- Designations: Archaeological protected monument (22 November 2002)

Kotalawala Walawwa is a historic Walawwa building situated in Hindagoda, Badulla, Sri Lanka. The building is located on the Badulla - Passara main road (A5), approximately 1 km (0.62 mi) away from the Badulla town. It was the residence of former Muhandiram Don Carolis Kotalawala. The Walawwa has been formally recognised by the Government as an archaeological protected monument in Sri Lanka. The designation was declared on 22 November 2002 under the government Gazette number 1264.

== History ==
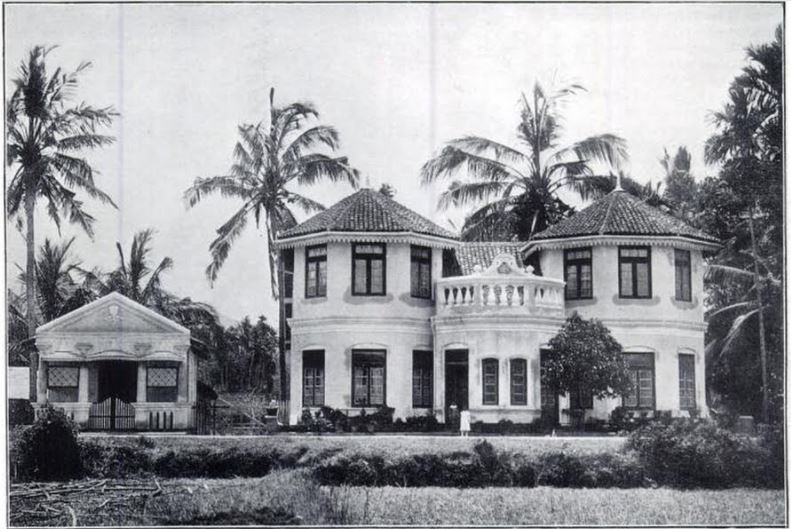
A photograph of the Kotalawala Walawwa in Arnold Wright's book Twentieth century impressions of Ceylon : its history, people, commerce, industries, and resources (1907). The Walawwa is mentioned in the book as 'Piya Niwasa'

Since 1818 uprising against the British colonial government, Uva area was suffering from the ravages of British military actions. It is said that British rulers had almost neglected Uva's economic, transport and educational development. Therefore, some part of Badulla area was also in rural and forested state without proper development. Meanwhile, a youth named Don Carolis Kotalawala, born in 1847 from Undugoda, Raigam Korale area decided to migrate to Badulla and began his career as a good transporter. He first introduced a fleet of double bullock carts to transport goods through the jungle maze and personally supervised the transport network which was stalked by bandits and robbers. The success of his career led him into well known merchant and land proprietor in the area. Being a notable person in the region he was conferred the title Muhandiram and married to Sudu Menika Wijekoon, a lady of a high class family from the area. A stately house put up at Hindagoda off Badulla became their family residence and which was later known as Kotalawala Walawwa.

== See also ==
- Architecture of Sri Lanka
