= St. Mary's Cathedral, Badulla =

Roman Catholic cathedral in Badulla, Sri Lanka

St. Mary’s Cathedral
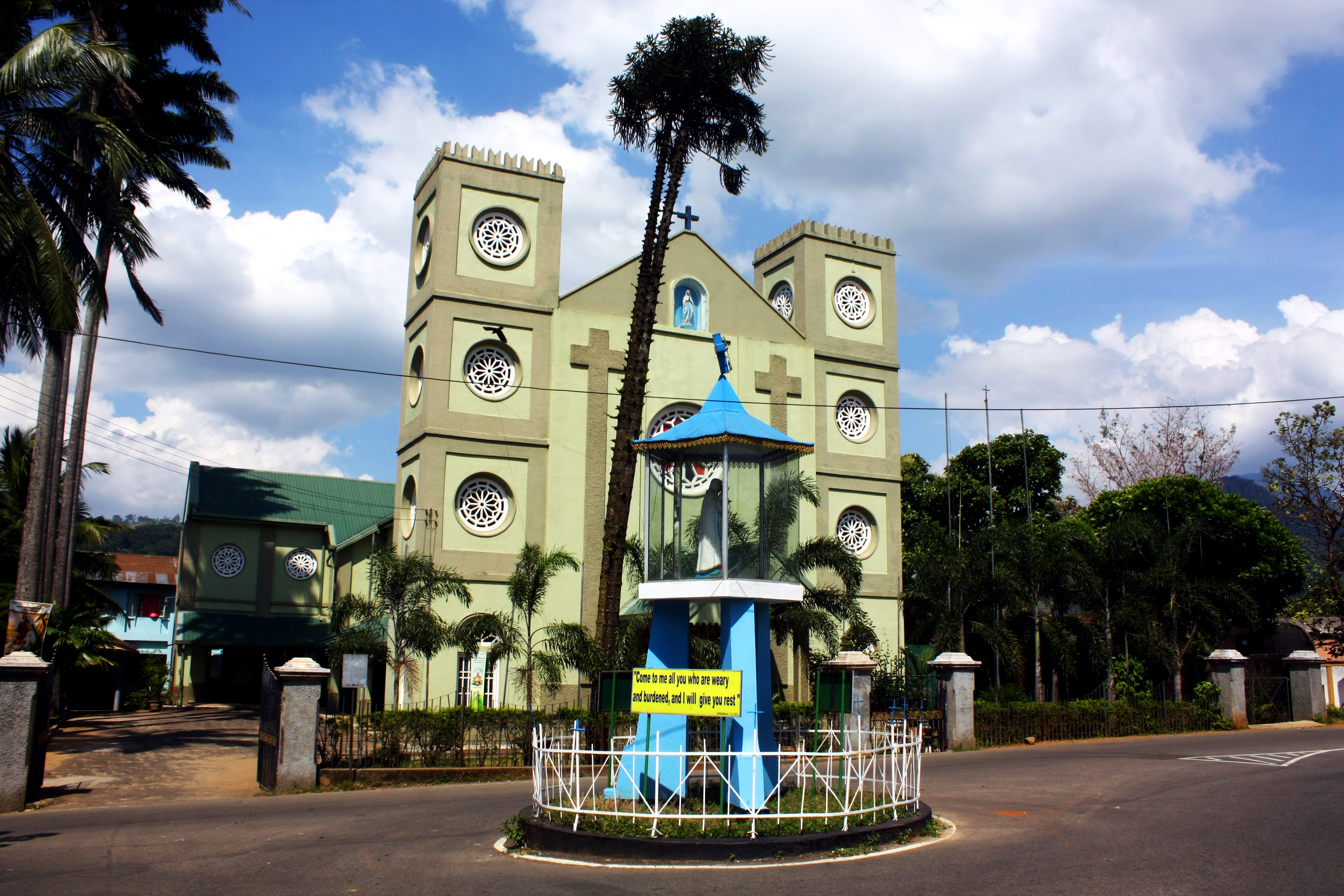
- St. Mary’s Cathedral
- 6°59′26″N 81°03′31″E
- Location: Badulla
- Country: Sri Lanka
- Denomination: Roman Catholic

History
- Status: Cathedral

Architecture
- Functional status: Active
- Groundbreaking: 1881; 145 years ago

Administration
- Archdiocese: Colombo
- Diocese: Badulla

Clergy
- Priest: Rev. Fr. Priyantha

St. Mary's Cathedral in Badulla, Sri Lanka, is the seat of the Roman Catholic Diocese of Badulla. It was established on 13 September 1881. The annual feast is held on the 2nd Sunday of October. The current church was built by the Rev. Fr. Peter Farina, OSB in the 1950s.

St. Mary's Cathedral featured on Christmas postal stamps issued by the Sri Lankan government in 2009.
