= Maladera badullana =

Scientific classification
- Kingdom: Animalia
- Phylum: Arthropoda
- Class: Insecta
- Order: Coleoptera
- Suborder: Polyphaga
- Infraorder: Scarabaeiformia
- Family: Scarabaeidae
- Genus: Maladera
- Species: M. badullana

Binomial name
- Maladera badullana Fabrizi & Ahrens, 2014

Species of beetle

Maladera badullana is a species of beetle of the family Scarabaeidae. It is found in Sri Lanka.

== Description ==
Adults reach a length of about 8.6-8.8 mm. They have a dark reddish brown, oval body, with yellowish brown antennae. The dorsal surface is dull and nearly glabrous, except for a few fine setae on the head, pronotum and elytra.

== Etymology ==
The species is named after its vicinity to the city of Badulla.
