= Pattini =

Guardian deity of Sri Lanka

- Other names: Pattini Deviyo
- Affiliation: Kannaki Amman
- Symbol: Anklet; Neem leaves
- Mount: Goat

Pattini (Sinhala: පත්තිනි දෙවියෝ, romanized: Pattiṉi Deviyō, Tamil: கண்ணகி அம்மன், romanized: Kaṇṇaki Ammaṉ) is considered a guardian deity of Sri Lanka in both Sri Lankan Buddhism and Sinhalese folklore. She is also worshipped by Sri Lankan Tamil Hindus under the name Kannaki Amman.

Pattini is regarded as the patron goddess of fertility and health, especially as a protector against smallpox, which is referred to in Sinhala as deviyange ledé ("the divine affliction").

== History ==
Goddess Pattini is the deified form of Kannaki, the central character of the Tamil epic Cilappatikaram, composed by Ilango Adigal in south India after the 2nd century CE. The worship of Pattini was introduced to Sri Lanka shortly thereafter, where it absorbed earlier local deities such as Kiri Amma ("the Milk Mother"). Historians attribute the introduction of Goddess Pattini to Gajabahu I, a Sinhalese ruler who reigned in Sri Lanka from 113 to 135 CE. According to some historians, the Cilappatikaram mentions Gajabahu's presence at the consecration of a temple to Kannaki (identified with Pattini) by the Chera king Cenkuttuvan.

== Rituals ==
Pattini is honored in annual fertility rites such as:

- Gammaduwa (the village rebirth) festivals, during which the Pattini myth is dramatized.
- Ankeliya (the horn games), where teams—similar to the British "Uppies and Downies"—compete in a contest.
- Porakeliya (the fight games), during which two teams hurl coconuts at each other.

== Nursing mothers' alms-giving ==
The Sinhalese people believe that diseases like chickenpox and measles are punishments by the gods for human frailty. During such illnesses, they pray to Pattini Devi, the Goddess of Healing. When a family member is infected, they hold dānas (alms-givings) in her honor, called Kiri-ammāwarungè dānaya (the Nursing Mothers' Alms-Giving).

As part of the ritual, Sri Lankan Sinhalese families first invite seven or more (in multiples of seven) virtuous women known for their good behavior. They then prepare traditional dishes such as Kiriya (a sweet dish similar to Dodol, made from pure coconut milk, jaggery, treacle, and sometimes plums and cashew nuts), Kavum (Sri Lankan oil cake), milk aluwa, and milk rice. All these dishes are made using milk, which is considered a symbol of good fortune. Plantains are also included.

On the day of the alms-giving, the food is first offered to Lord Buddha and Goddess Pattini. Afterwards, the invited women are served. The ceremony concludes with the reading of the ancient text Pattini Halla and the chanting of verses dedicated to goddess Pattini.

== Pattini temples in Sri Lanka ==
| Devalaya/Temple | Image | Location | District | Province | Description | Refs |
|---|---|---|---|---|---|---|
| Halpe Pattini Devalaya | | Halpe | Badulla | Uva Province | Archaeologically protected monument | |
| Kabulumulla Pattini Devalaya | | | | | One of the four major Pattini temples where the great 'Pattini Salamba' is preserved. This devale was built by king Rajasinghe I in 1582. | |
| Lindamulla Pattini Devalaya | | Lindamulla | Badulla | Uva Province | Archaeologically protected monument | |
| Maduwa Pattini Devalaya | | | | | The festival of the Pattini Devale is held here annually during the July–August season. | |
| Mahanuwara Pattini Devalaya | | Kandy | Kandy | Central | The Pattini Devale is located to the west of the Natha Devale, near the premises of the Sri Dalada Maligawa. | |
| Nawagamuwa Pattini Devalaya | | Nawagamuwa | Colombo | Western | According to legend, Gajabahu I of Anuradhapura (114–136 AD) returned from India with 12,000 prisoners and brought with him a Pattini anklet. He landed at a place near the devalaya, which was later built to enshrine the anklet. | |
| Madulla Paththini Devalaya | | Madulla | Nuwara Eliya | Central | An ancient devala built by king Rajasinghe II. | |
| Gagula Sri Sudharshana Pattini Devalaya | | | | | One of the oldest Pattini temples on the western coast of Sri Lanka. | |
| Mee Gaha Kovila Pattini Devalaya | | | | | Oldest Pattini temple located in the city of Panadura. It is named after the large Mee tree found within its premises. The temple also has several large tamarind trees. | |

== See also ==
- Kannaki Amman
- Upulvan
- Kannagi
- Kataragama deviyo
