= St. Mark's Church, Badulla =

Anglican church in Sri Lanka

St. Mark's Church
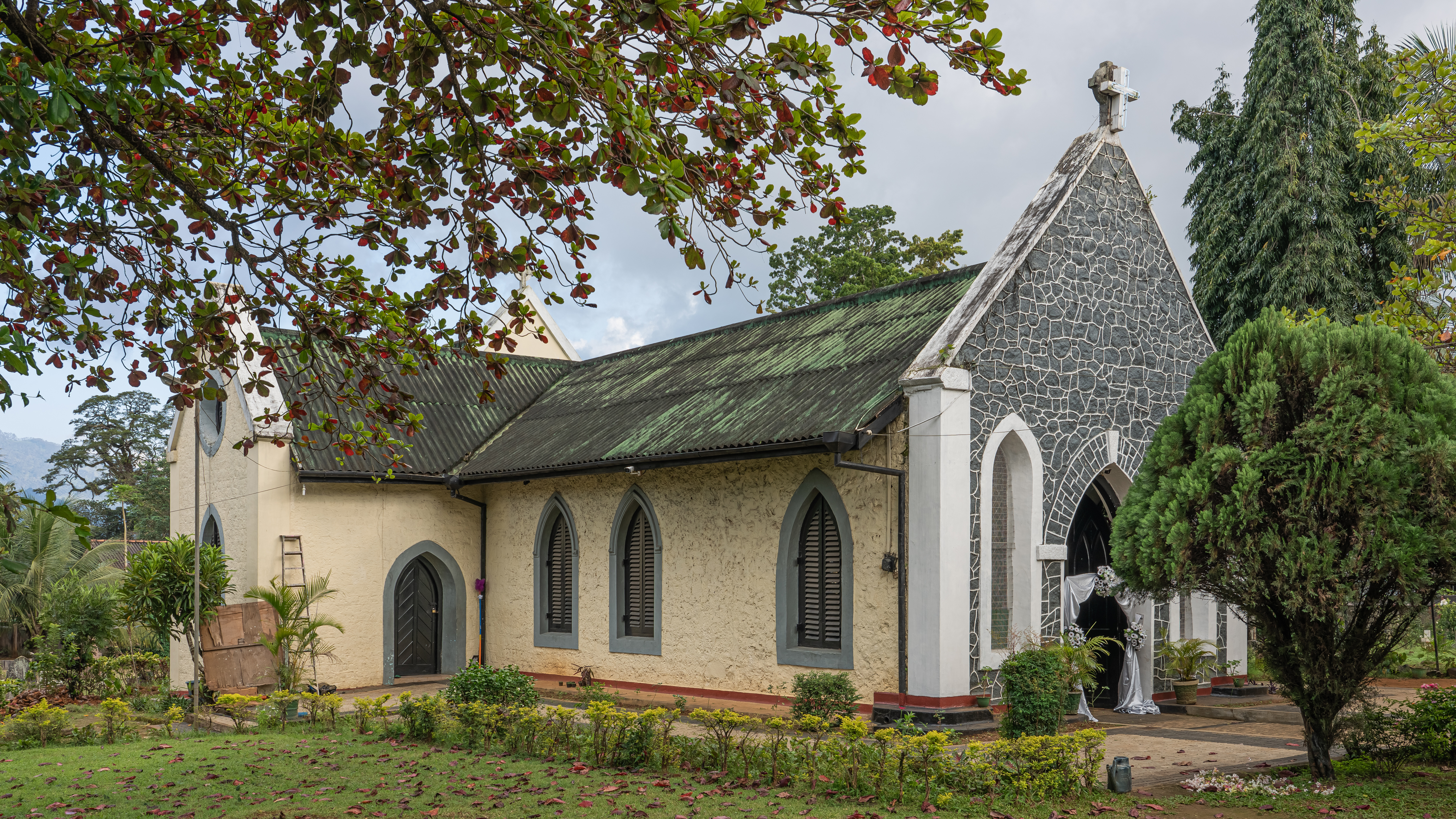
- St. Mark's Church at Badulla

- Location of St. Mark's Church, Badulla within Sri Lanka

Religion
- Affiliation: Anglican
- Province: Uva Province
- Year consecrated: 1857; 169 years ago
- Status: Active

Location
- Location: Mahiyangana Road, Badulla
- Country: Sri Lanka
- Coordinates: 06°59′25.1″N 81°03′25.9″E

Architecture
- Type: Church
- Completed: 1857

Website
- St. Mark's Church, Badulla

St. Mark's Church, is an Anglican church in Badulla in Sri Lanka. The church is located in the central ward of Badulla Municipal Council at the junction of Mahiyangana – Badulla main road (B36). It was consecrated on 25 April 1857 by Bishop James Chapman. In April 2008 the church and the bell tower were formally recognised by the Government as an archaeological protected monument in Sri Lanka and declared as "protected monuments" by the acting Minister of National Heritage, Mahinda Yapa Abeywardena. The designation was formally included on 6 June 2008 in the government Gazette number 1553.

== History ==
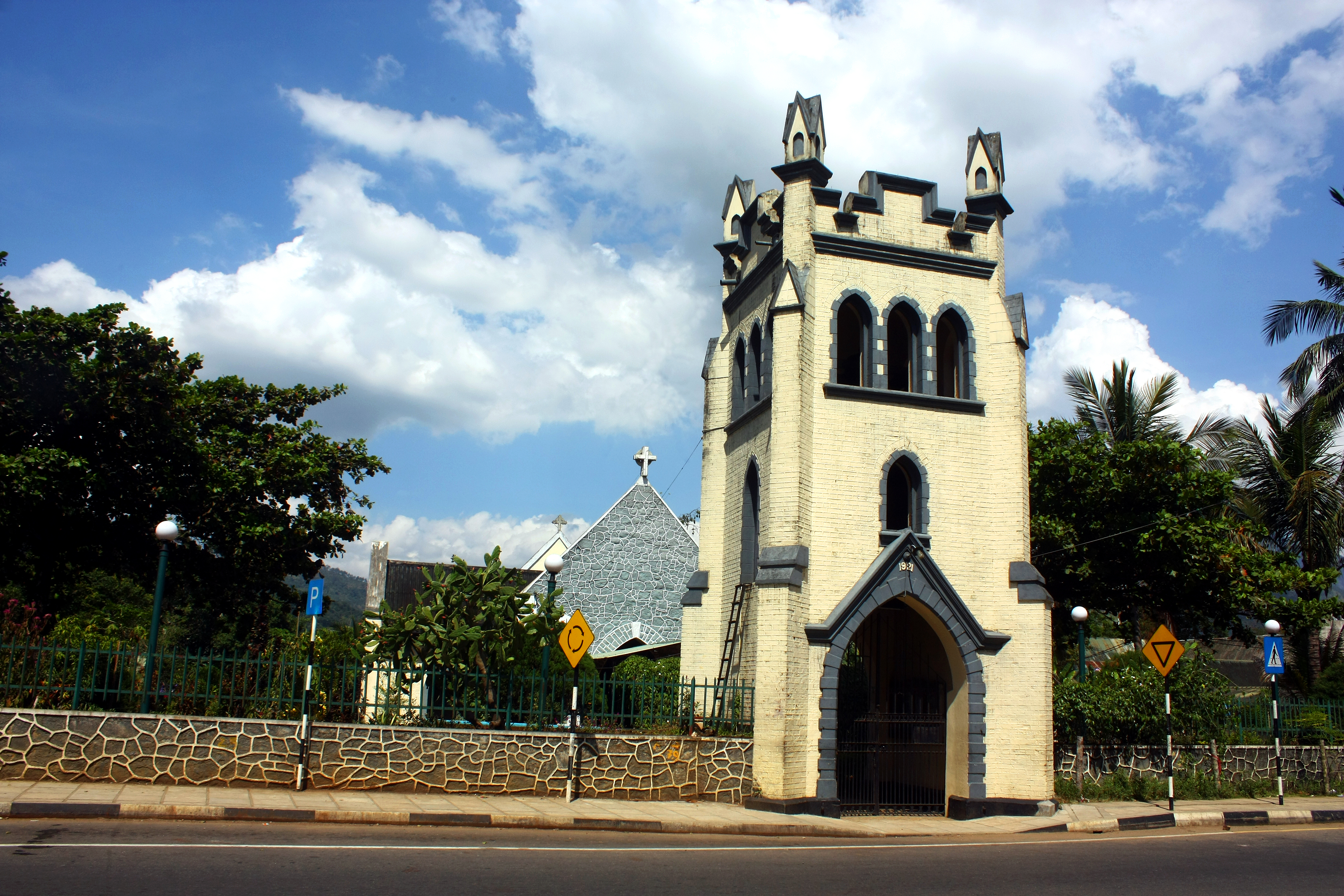
The 1921 belltower at St. Mark's Church, as viewed from the road

Before 1857 church services were conducted in the local court house by the priest from Nuwara Eliya. On 24 February 1846 Bishop James Chapman visited Badulla and held a service in the court house which was attended by district officials and coffee planters. The next day he organised a public meeting for neighbourhood Ceylonese and Europeans to make preliminary arrangements for the construction of a church. After initiating the work of church he visited Badulla again in 1850 and 1853. It is said that people of all religions and races in Badulla contributed to the construction of the church.

The church was finally erected by public subscription in the memory of Major Thomas William Rogers, (the Government Agent for Badulla District) who is said to have shot, at the very lowest estimate 1,400 wild elephants. He died on 7 June 1845, struck by lightning at Sherwood estate in Haputale. He was buried in Nuwara Eliya, where his tomb was also struck by lightning numerous times. The church was consecrated on 25 April 1857 (St. Mark's day) by Bishop Chapman.

The first vicar at the church was Rev. E. Mooyart. The twelfth vicar, from 1900 to 1925, was Rev. William J. P. Waltham, who established the St. Mark's missionary school at Medagama, which later became Uva College. In 1921 he built the bell tower of the church, with the money donated by church warden.
