= Old Welekade Market =

- වෙලේකඩේ පැරණි වෙළඳ ගොඩනැගිල්ල
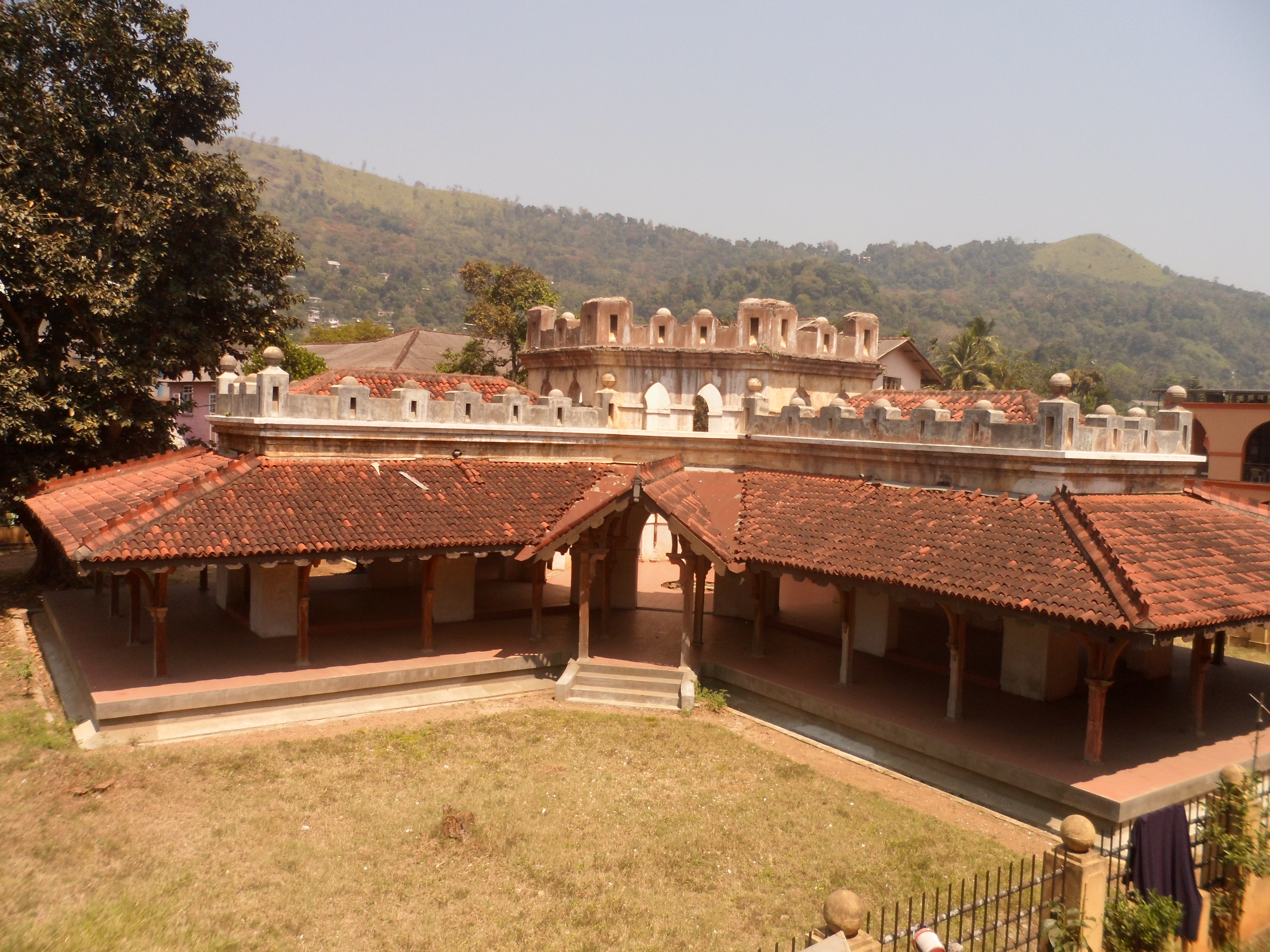
- Interactive map of the Old Welekade Market area
- Alternative names: Badulla Dutch Fort (erroneously)

General information
- Type: Archaeological protected monument(6 June 2008)
- Architectural style: British colonial architecture
- Location: Badulla, Sri Lanka
- Coordinates: 6°59′29.6″N 81°03′13.9″E
- Completed: 1889
- Owner: Archaeological Department (Sri Lanka)

The Old Welekade Market (Sinhala: වෙලේකඩේ පැරණි වෙළඳ ගොඩනැගිල්ල) is a historic colonial building in Badulla, Sri Lanka. The site belonged to the Badulla Divisional Secretariat division and is located near the Badulla Hospital, on the Badulla-Bandarawela road.

The history about the construction of Welekade market building is unclear, with many people believing that it was erected by the Dutch as a kind of castle or fortress. According to more reliable sources the building was constructed by the British in 1889, as the first public building in the Uva province. Due to its historical importance, the Welekade building has been formally recognised by the government as an archaeological protected monument. The designation was declared on 6 June 2008 under the government Gazette number 1553.

== History ==
On 1 February 1886 the British government proclaimed Uva as a separate province of Ceylon and A. A. King was appointed as the new government agent for the province. As a benefit of closer relationship with the central government, King arranged for a new market building to be constructed in Badulla in 1889, three years after the proclamation of the province. It is said that the cost for the construction of the building was 5000 rupees. The further advantages gained by the province were construction of a new hospital and a Kachcheri building in close proximity to the market in 1890, and 1891 respectively.

The market has been built on the escarpment near a paddy field, and thus it may have resulted in its name, Welekade (shop of the paddy field). The building is said to be the first structure built under an autonomous province.

== Building ==
The market building has British architectural features, which can not be found anywhere in the country. The building was built in the shape of cross with a central high roof with a lower roof over the four entrances. The inner space layout consists of an octagonal shaped central compound with four corridors. The corridors are built at right angles to each other. The centre of the building is an open space which rises up to a turret.

== See also ==
- Old Nupe Market
- Old Edinburgh Market

== Notes ==
- "PART I : SECTION (I) — GENERAL Government Notifications" (PDF). The Gazette of the Democratic Socialist Republic of Sri Lanka. 1553. 6 June 2008. Archived from the original (PDF) on 4 April 2017.
