= Bandarawela Divisional Secretariat =

- Divisional Secretariat
- Interactive map of Bandarawela Divisional Secretariat
- Country: Sri Lanka
- Province: Uva Province
- District: Badulla District
- Time zone: UTC+5:30 (Sri Lanka Standard Time)

Bandarawela Divisional Secretariat is a Divisional Secretariat of Badulla District, of Uva Province, Sri Lanka.

== Demography-Religion ==
Religion in Bandarawela DS Division (2012)
1. Buddhist (72.2%)
2. Hindu (17.6%)
3. Muslim (5.50%)
4. Roman Catholic (3.30%)
5. Other Christian (1.40%)
6. Other (0.00%)
