= Uva College, Badulla =

Uva College
- ඌව මහා විද්‍යාලය

Location
- Badulla, Badulla District, Uva Province, 90000; Sri Lanka; 6°59′27″N 81°3′26″E

Information
- School type: national
- Motto: සෞභාග්‍යයෙන් ශ්‍රමය කරා
- Established: c. 1867
- School district: Badulla Education Zone
- Authority: Ministry of Education
- Principal: D.M.D Dissanayake
- Grades: 1 - 13
- Gender: Boys
- Houses: Shaantha House; Pragnya House; Maithree House; Weerya House
- Colours: Blue and gold
- Alumni name: Old Uvites
- Website: www.uvacomlab.sch.lk

Uva College, Badulla (Uva Maha Vidyalaya) is a public school in Uva province, Sri Lanka which was founded in 1867. A national school, it controlled by the central government (as opposed to the Provincial Council), it provides primary and secondary education. Uva College has supplied many undergraduates from Badulla District to local universities.

== History ==
Uva College was the first school established in the Uva province in 1867, by the Diocesan mission of Ceylon. It is situated in the heart of Badulla town. From the inception the college had two halls and two dormitories with a science laboratory. Adjoining the office was the principal's quarters. The first principal was Mr. William. At first there were only twelve students and of these eight were Tamils. Seven students entered university. There were also several girls attending Advanced Level classes.

The medium taught at that time was English and one subject was taught either in Sinhala or Tamil. Then the college came under the tutelage of Christian fathers.

== Status ==
The school educates nearly 2,000 primary and secondary students in Sinhala. It is administratively divided into two sections: primary (grades 1–5) and secondary (grades 6–13). The school provides housing for boys.
