= Kumarapattiya =

Coordinates: 6°55′59″N 80°54′00″E

Kumarapattiya is a settlement in Badulla District, Uva Province, Sri Lanka.
