= Haputale Divisional Secretariat =

- Divisional Secretariat
- Interactive map of Haputale Divisional Secretariat
- Country: Sri Lanka
- Province: Uva Province
- District: Badulla District
- Time zone: UTC+5:30 (Sri Lanka Standard Time)

Haputale Divisional Secretariat is a Divisional Secretariat of Badulla District, of Uva Province, Sri Lanka.

== Demography-Religion ==
Religion in Haputale DS Division (2012)
1. Buddhist (52.6%)
2. Hindu (34.8%)
3. Muslim (7.40%)
4. Roman Catholic (4.10%)
5. Other Christian (1.20%)
6. Other (0.00%)
