= Uva-Paranagama Divisional Secretariat =

Uva-Paranagama Divisional Secretariat ඌව පරණගම
- Divisional Secretariat
- Interactive map of Uva-Paranagama Divisional Secretariat
- Country: Sri Lanka
- Province: Uva Province
- District: Badulla District
- Time zone: UTC+5:30 (Sri Lanka Standard Time)

Uva-Paranagama Divisional Secretariat is a Divisional Secretariat of Badulla District, of Uva Province, Sri Lanka.

== Demography-Religion ==
Religion in Uva-Paranagama DS Division (2012)
1. Buddhist (83.8%)
2. Hindu (12.3%)
3. Muslim (2.90%)
4. Roman Catholic (0.60%)
5. Other Christian (0.40%)
6. Other (0.00%)
