= Welimada Divisional Secretariat =

- Divisional Secretariat
- Interactive map of Welimada Divisional Secretariat
- Country: Sri Lanka
- Province: Uva Province
- District: Badulla District
- Time zone: UTC+5:30 (Sri Lanka Standard Time)

Welimada Divisional Secretariat is a Divisional Secretariat of Badulla District, of Uva Province, Sri Lanka.

== Demography-Religion ==
Religion in Welimada DS Division (2012)
1. Buddhist (70.6%)
2. Hindu (11.3%)
3. Muslim (16.8%)
4. Roman Catholic (0.70%)
5. Other Christian (0.50%)
6. Other (0.00%)
