= Kandaketiya Divisional Secretariat =

- Divisional Secretariat
- Country: Sri Lanka
- Province: Uva Province
- District: Badulla District
- Time zone: UTC+5:30 (Sri Lanka Standard Time)

Kandaketiya Divisional Secretariat is a Divisional Secretariat of Badulla District, of Uva Province, Sri Lanka.

== Demography-Religion ==
Religion in Kandaketiya DS Division (2012)
1. Buddhist (93.8%)
2. Hindu (3.30%)
3. Muslim (2.40%)
4. Roman Catholic (0.20%)
5. Other Christian (0.30%)
6. Other (0.00%)
