= Diocese of Badulla =

Latin Catholic diocese in Sri Lanka

Coordinates: 6.9906°N 81.0586°E

Diocese of Badulla Dioecesis Badullana பதுளை மாவட்ட
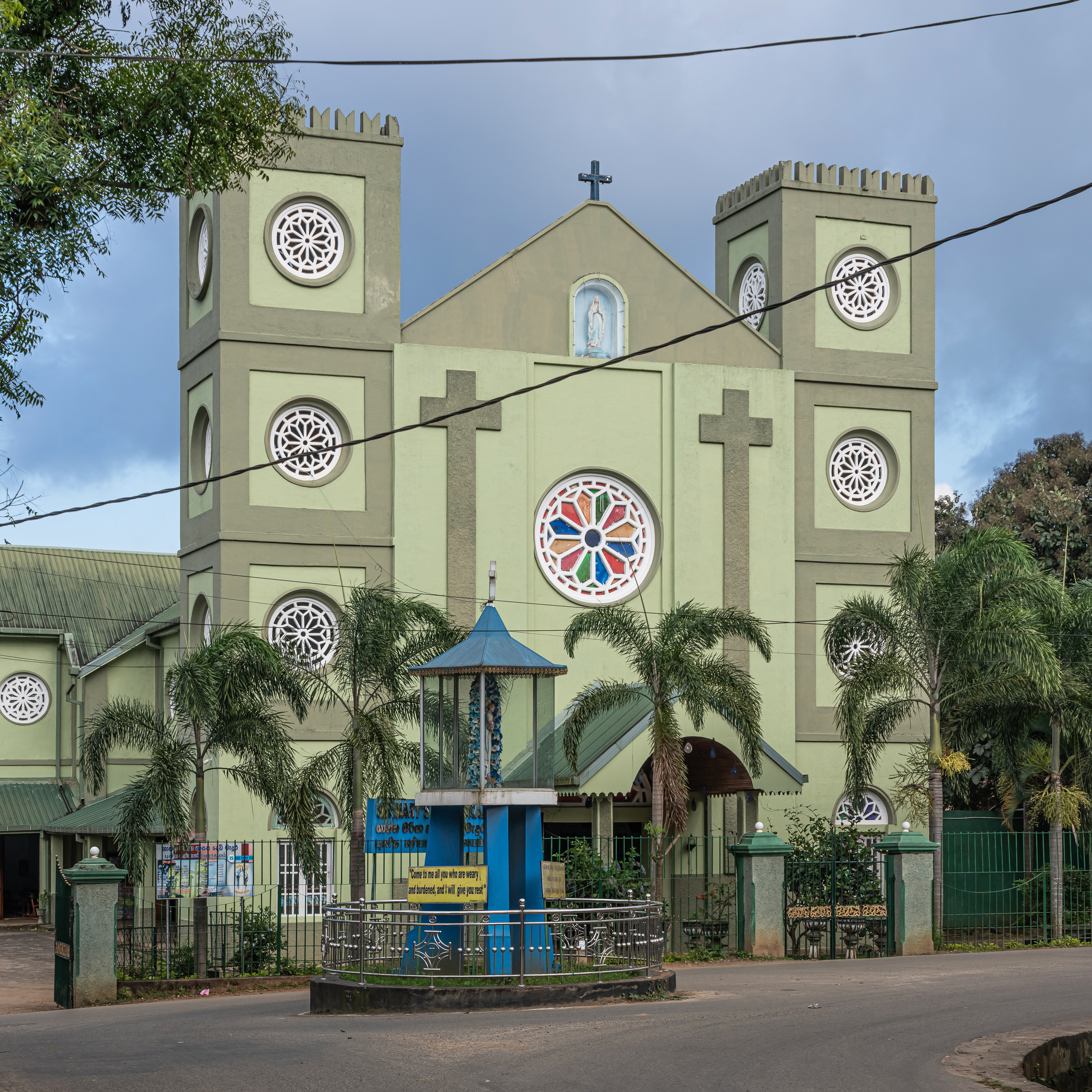
- Badulla, St Mary Church

Location
- Country: Sri Lanka
- Ecclesiastical province: Colombo
- Metropolitan: Colombo

Statistics
- Area: 9,349 km^{2} (3,610 sq mi)
- Population: Total; Catholics: (as of 2012); 1,724,000; 18,635 (1.1%)

Information
- Denomination: Catholic Church
- Sui iuris church: Latin Church
- Rite: Roman Rite
- Established: 18 December 1972
- Cathedral: Cathedral of St Mary in Badulla

Current leadership
- Pope: Leo XIV
- Bishop elect: Echchampulle Arachchige Jude Nishanta Silva
- Metropolitan Archbishop: Malcolm Ranjith
- Bishops emeritus: Julian Winston Sebastian Fernando

Website
- Website of the Diocese

The Diocese of Badulla (Lat: Dioecesis Badullana) is a diocese of the Latin Church of the Catholic Church in Sri Lanka.

Erected as the Diocese of Badulla in 1972, the diocese was created from territory in the Diocese of Kandy. The diocese is suffragan to the Archdiocese of Colombo. Its cathedral is St. Mary’s church.

The current bishop, Echchampulle Arachchige Jude Nishanta Silva, was appointed in January 2023.

== Ordinaries ==
- Leo Nanayakkara, O.S.B. (18 December 1972 Appointed – 28 May 1982 Died)
- Edmund Joseph Fernando, O.M.I. (5 December 1983 Appointed – 3 March 1997 Retired)
- Julian Winston Sebastian Fernando, S.S.S. (25 March 1997 – 30 January 2023)
- Echchampulle Arachchige Jude Nishanta Silva (30 January 2023 – present)
