= Soranathota Divisional Secretariat =

- Divisional Secretariat
- Country: Sri Lanka
- Province: Uva Province
- District: Badulla District
- Time zone: UTC+5:30 (Sri Lanka Standard Time)

Soranathota Divisional Secretariat is a Divisional Secretariat of Badulla District, of Uva Province, Sri Lanka.

== Demography-Religion ==
Religion in Soranathota DS Division (2012)
1. Buddhist (80.1%)
2. Hindu (17.6%)
3. Muslim (1.30%)
4. Roman Catholic (0.60%)
5. Other Christian (0.40%)
6. Other (0.00%)
