= Passara Divisional Secretariat =

- Divisional Secretariat
- Interactive map of Passara Divisional Secretariat
- Country: Sri Lanka
- Province: Uva Province
- District: Badulla District
- Time zone: UTC+5:30 (Sri Lanka Standard Time)

Passara Divisional Secretariat is a Divisional Secretariat of Badulla District, of Uva Province, Sri Lanka.

== Demography-Religion ==
Religion in Passara DS Division (2012)
1. Buddhist (55.7%)
2. Hindu (35.2%)
3. Muslim (5.00%)
4. Roman Catholic (2.20%)
5. Other Christian (1.80%)
6. Other (0.00%)
