= Hali-Ela Divisional Secretariat =

- Divisional Secretariat
- Interactive map of Hali-Ela Divisional Secretariat
- Country: Sri Lanka
- Province: Uva Province
- District: Badulla District
- Time zone: UTC+5:30 (Sri Lanka Standard Time)

Hali-Ela Divisional Secretariat is a Divisional Secretariat of Badulla District, of Uva Province, Sri Lanka.

== Demography-Religion ==
Religion in Hali-Ela DS Division (2012)
1. Buddhist (64.2%)
2. Hindu (29.0%)
3. Muslim (4.60%)
4. Roman Catholic (1.40%)
5. Other Christian (0.90%)
6. Other (0.00%)
