= Ella Divisional Secretariat =

- Divisional Secretariat
- Interactive map of Ella Divisional Secretariat
- Country: Sri Lanka
- Province: Uva Province
- District: Badulla District
- Time zone: UTC+5:30 (Sri Lanka Standard Time)

Ella Divisional Secretariat is a Divisional Secretariat of Badulla District, of Uva Province, Sri Lanka.

== Demography-Religion ==
Religion in Ella DS Division (2012)
1. Buddhist (66.3%)
2. Hindu (27.3%)
3. Muslim (4.30%)
4. Roman Catholic (1.20%)
5. Other Christian (0.90%)
6. Other (0.00%)
