= Bogoda Wooden Bridge =

Bridge in Sri Lanka

The Bogoda Wooden Bridge was built in the 16th century during the Dambadeniya era. This is said to be the oldest surviving wooden bridge in Sri Lanka. The bridge is situated at 7 kilometres (4.3 mi) west of Badulla. All parts of this bridge were constructed from wood, including the nails used for fastening. The roof tiles show the influence of Kingdom of Kandy. The bridge was built across the Gallanda Oya, which linked Badulla and Kandy on an ancient route.

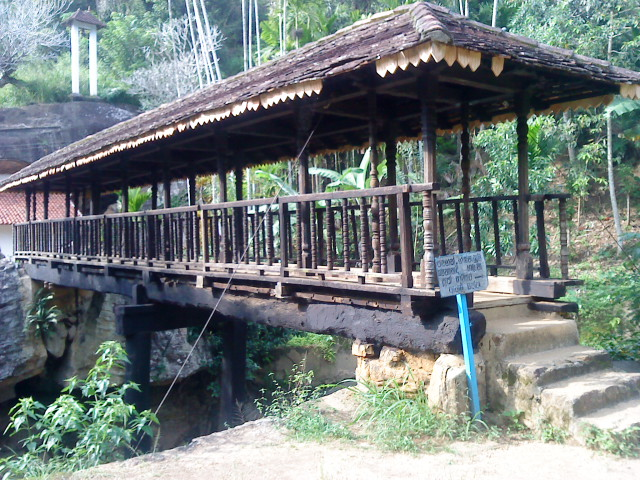
Bogoda wooden bridge

== Description ==
The Bogoda bridge is over 400 years old and made entirely from wooden planks, which are said to have come from one tree. It is an exclusive construction as it has an 2.4 metres (7.9 ft) tall tiled roof structure for its entire span of nearly 15 metres (49 ft) length with a 1.5 metres (4.9 ft) breadth. Wooden fences erected on either side of the bridge are decorated in various ancient designs.

The structure of the bridge is standing on a huge tree trunk 11 metres (36 ft) in height. Jack fruit (Artocarpus heterophyllus) logs and Kumbuk (Terminalia arjuna) logs were mainly used as the construction material for the bridge. Kaluwara (Diospyros ebenum) timber and Milla timber were used for the wooden decorations.

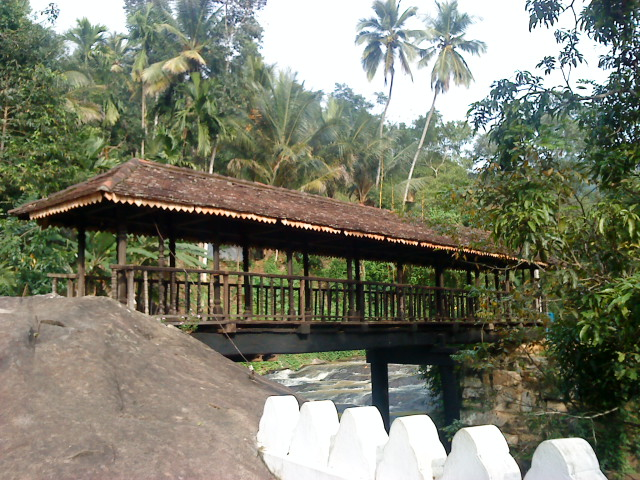
Side view of the bogoda wooden bridge

== Bogoda temple ==
The Bogoda Buddhist temple is an ancient temple situated beside the Bogoda Wooden Bridge. The temple has a much longer history than the bridge. It is from the 1st century BC, during the period of the Anuradhapura era. The temple was built per the instructions of King Valagamba. The stone inscription by the temple, in Brahmin scripture [Brahmi script], says the temple was donated to a priest called Brahmadatta by Tissa, a provincial leader in Badulla.

Inside of the temple were elaborate paintings, bearing resemblance to the Kandyan era. The walls were built with a paste made of cotton wool, bee honey and extracted and purified white clay. The paintings were painted on these walls.

On 27 May 2011 Sri Lanka Post issued a Rs. 15 stamp with a photograph of the bridge, as part of a set of stamps commemorating bridges and culverts in Sri Lanka.
