= Passara =

Passara පස්සර
- Town
- Location within Sri Lanka
- Coordinates: 6°56′08.9″N 81°09′28.6″E
- Country: Sri Lanka
- District: Badulla District
- Time zone: UTC+5:30 (SLST)
- Postal code: 90500

Passara (Sinhala: පස්සර) is a town in Badulla District, Uva Province of Sri Lanka. The town is located on Peradeniya-Badulla-Chenkalady main road, approximately 18 km (11 mi) away from Badulla City.

== Education ==
The government owned schools in Passara area are listed below.

- Passara Tamil Maha Vidyalaya
- Passara Central College.
- Passara Gamunu Maha Vidyalaya.
- Gonagala Maha Vidyalaya.
- Meeriyabedda Vidyalaya.
- Sapuroda Vidyalaya.
- Paramahankada Maha Vidyalaya.
- Thennuge Vidyalaya.
- Madugasthalawa Vidyalaya.
- Gonakele Tamil Maha Vidyalaya.
- Passara Muslim Maha Vidyalaya.
- Dameriya No.1 Tamil Vidyalaya.
- Dameriya No.2 Tamil Vidyalaya.
- Dameriya No.3 Tamil Vidyalaya.
- Elteb No.1 Tamil Vidyalaya.
- Elteb No.2 Tamil Vidyalaya.
- Elteb No.3 Tamil Vidyalaya.
- Thennuge Tamil Vidyalaya.
- Galbokka Tamil Vidyalaya.
- Mahadowa Tamil Vidyalaya.
- Passara No. 2 Tamil Vidyalaya.
- Passara No.4 Tamil Vidyalaya.

== Tourist attractions ==
- Passara Raja Maha Vihara is an ancient temple, believed to be built during the reign of King Sri Vikrama Rajasingha and located in the Pallegama area.
- Ardun Falls is a waterfall located near to Passara Madolsima road.
- Geradi Ella Falls is a waterfall located on Medawelagama road about 13 km (8.1 mi) from Passara town.
- Bambaragala Pathana
- Namunukula Mountain Range
- Kovilkada mountain
- Lunugala mountain
