= Haldummulla Divisional Secretariat =

- Divisional Secretariat
- Interactive map of Haldummulla Divisional Secretariat
- Country: Sri Lanka
- Province: Uva Province
- District: Badulla District
- Time zone: UTC+5:30 (Sri Lanka Standard Time)

Haldummulla Divisional Secretariat is a Divisional Secretariat of Badulla District, of Uva Province, Sri Lanka.

== Demography-Religion ==
Religion in Haldummulla DS Division (2012)
1. Buddhist (52.4%)
2. Hindu (43.8%)
3. Muslim (1.20%)
4. Roman Catholic (1.10%)
5. Other Christian (1.40%)
6. Other (0.10%)
