= Badulla Kataragama Devalaya =

Badulla Kataragama Devalaya බදුල්ල කතරගම දේවාලය
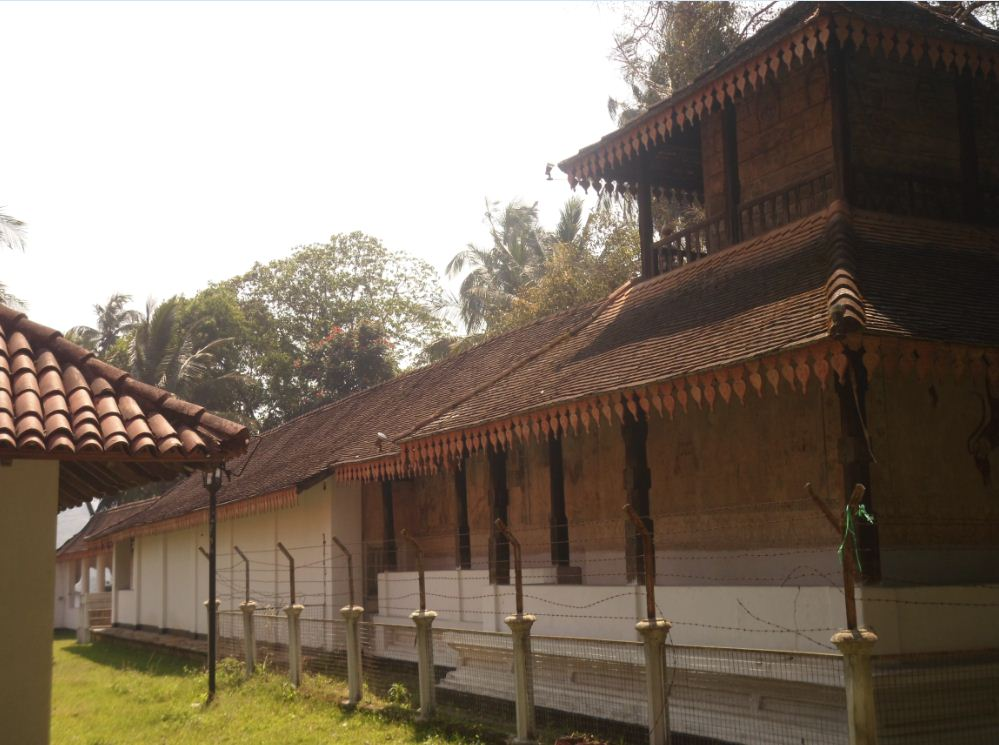

Religion
- Affiliation: Buddhism
- District: Badulla
- Province: Uva Province
- Deity: Kataragama deviyo

Location
- Location: Badulla, Sri Lanka
- Interactive map of Badulla Kataragama Devalaya බදුල්ල කතරගම දේවාලය
- Coordinates: 06°59′13.9″N 81°03′28.0″E

Architecture
- Type: Devalaya
- Founder: King Vimaladharmasuriya I

Badulla Kataragama Devalaya is an ancient devalaya, situated in Badulla, Sri Lanka. It is a devalaya that is dedicated to the Sinhalese deity Kataragama deviyo, whose main and major shine is situated at south part of the island at Kataragama. The devalaya has been formally recognised by the government as an archaeological protected monument. The designation was declared on 23 March 1952 under the government Gazette number 10395.

== History ==
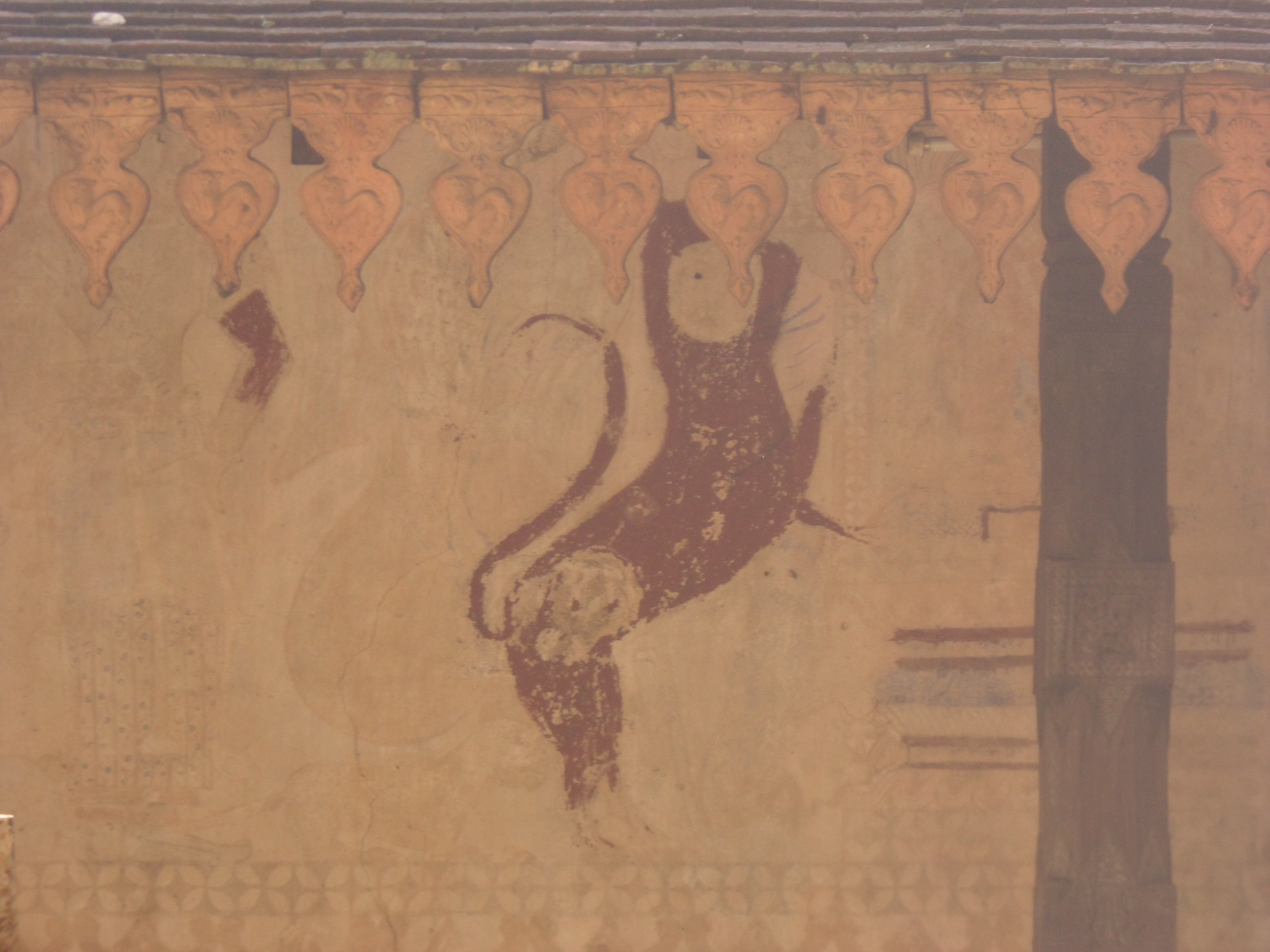
Paintings on outer wall of Devalaya

The exact date of the devalaya's construction is not known, but it is believed that it was built in the 17th century, under the patronage of King Vimaladharmasuriya I (1592–1604) who ruled the Kingdom of Kandy.

Badulla, where the Devalaya is situated, was a sub-kingdom of the Kandyan kingdom. At the end of August 1630 the Badulla territory was invaded by the Portuguese Army, under the leadership of General Constantino de Sa. According to the reports they ransacked and looted the entire city and had destroyed thousand of rice stalks and all the cattle that they could find in the countryside. It is reported that the original buildings of devalaya were also destroyed by the Portuguese army. Soon after the devastation, the devalaya was restored and re-endowed by King Rajasinghe II (1635–1687).

== Legends ==
According to one local legend, related to the devalaya, a minor king, Kumarasinghe, battled a large army of Portuguese, who had tried to invade Badulla. The battle occurred at a paddy field called Randeniwala, where Kumarasinghe conquered the foreign army. After the victory against the Portuguese, the local people called it the Battle of Randeniwela.

== The Temple ==
The devalaya consists of a Pilimageya (Shrine room), kitchen, Sinhasanaya (Chamber of Throne) and the abode of priest. The roof of the devalaya is supported on carved timber columns and the outside of the walls are adorned with Kandyan era paintings. The Sinhasanaya which was used by kings to watch the processions, is situated at the front of the devalaya. The wood carvings of the Sinhasanaya are reported to be similar to the carvings at Embekka Devalaya.

== See also ==
- Kataragama temple
