= Badulla Divisional Secretariat =

- Divisional Secretariat
- Interactive map of Badulla Divisional Secretariat
- Country: Sri Lanka
- Province: Uva Province
- District: Badulla District
- Time zone: UTC+5:30 (Sri Lanka Standard Time)

Badulla Divisional Secretariat is a Divisional Secretariat of Badulla District, of Uva Province, Sri Lanka.

== Demography-Religion ==
Religion in Badulla DS Division (2012)
1. Buddhist (68.8%)
2. Hindu (18.0%)
3. Muslim (10.3%)
4. Roman Catholic (1.70%)
5. Other Christian (1.10%)
6. Other (0.00%)
