= Muthiyangana Raja Maha Vihara =

Ancient Buddhist temple

- මුතියංගණ රජ මහා විහාරය
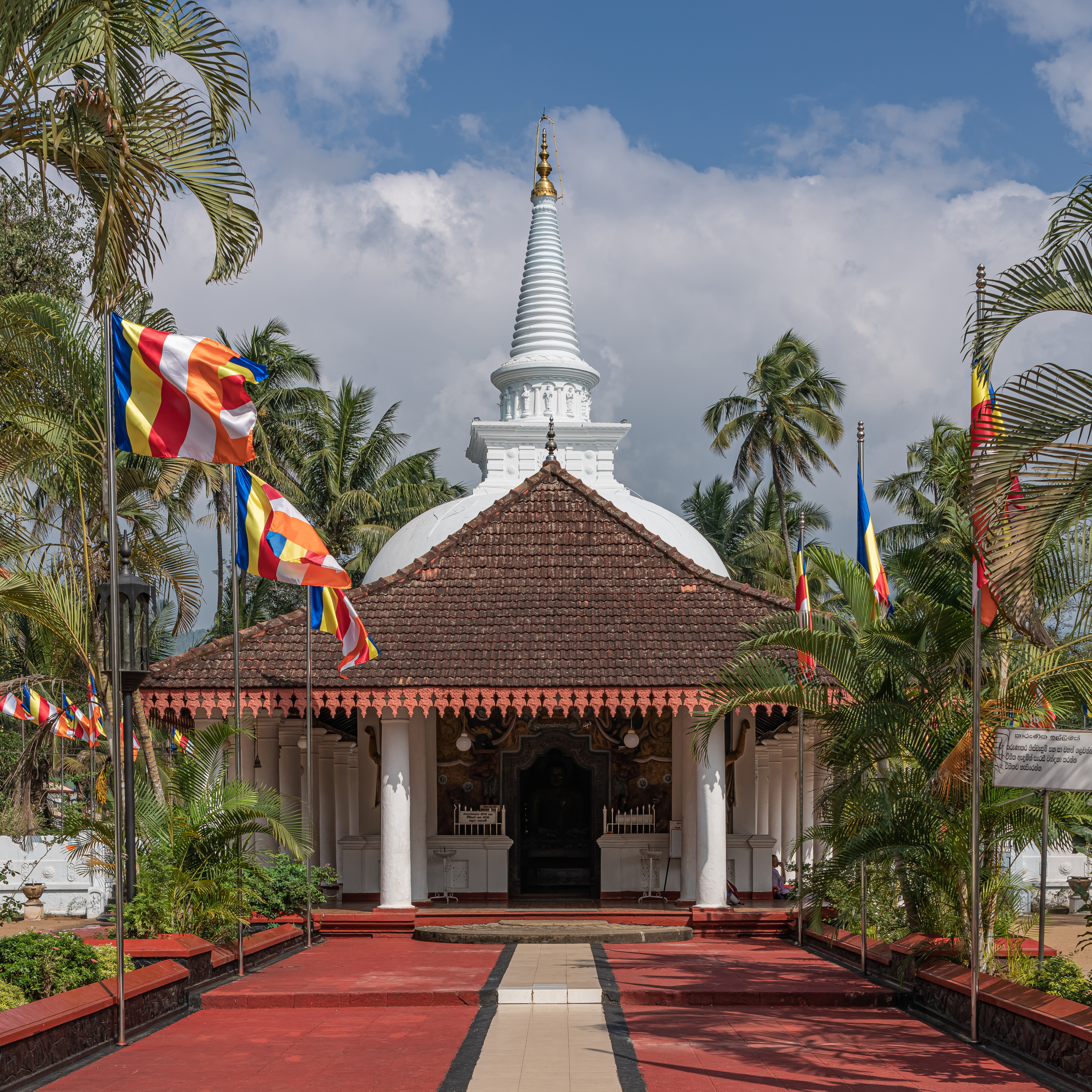

Religion
- Affiliation: Buddhism
- District: Badulla
- Province: Uva Province

Location
- Location: Badulla, Sri Lanka
- Interactive map of Muthiyangana Raja Maha Vihara
- Coordinates: 06°59′03.3″N 81°03′40.8″E

Architecture
- Type: Buddhist Temple

Muthiyangana Raja Maha Vihara is an ancient Buddhist temple located in the middle of Badulla town in the Badulla District of Uva Province in Sri Lanka.

== History ==
Buddhists believe that this site has been visited by Gautama Buddha, and it is regarded as one of the Solosmasthana, the 16 sacred places in the country. On the 8th year after attaining the Enlightenment, the Buddha made his 3rd visit to Kelaniya on the invitation by a king of Naga people named Maniakkitha. During this visit, a local chieftain named Indaka invited Buddha to visit his place in Badulla. At the end of sermons made by Buddha there, Indaka had wanted something to worship in memory of Buddha's visit. The Buddha is said to have given him a few of his hairs and a few drops of sweat that turned into pearls (mukthaka). Indaka had enshrined these sacred hair and pearls in a stupa, believed to be the stupa here. Indaka, the chieftain of then Deva people is now regarded as a deity, reigning the Namunukula mountain range and Muthiyangana Raja Maha Viharaya.

This site is not cited in well known historical chronicles such as Mahavamsa, Bodhi Vamsa or Dhātuvansa but mentioned in the Samantapasadika which is older than the former documentaries. It states, "The Lord Buddha visited this island thrice. Third time He arrived with 500 monks. Being entered into Nirodha Samapatti (attainment of ceasing of feeling and perception) He stayed here...", turning the site into most sacred religious one for the Buddhists. This is also regarded as one of 32 Buddhist religious sites wherein the saplings bred from Anuradhapura Jaya Sri Maha Bodhi have been planted.

== Refurbishment ==
King Devanampiya Tissa (307 - 266 BC) further developed the original stupa and turned the site into a temple complex. Thereafter King Jettha Tissa I (266 - 276 AD), King Dhatusena (459-477 AD), King Vijayabahu I (1055–1110 AD) and King Parakramabahu I (1153–1186 AD) have renovated the stupa.

== Attractions ==
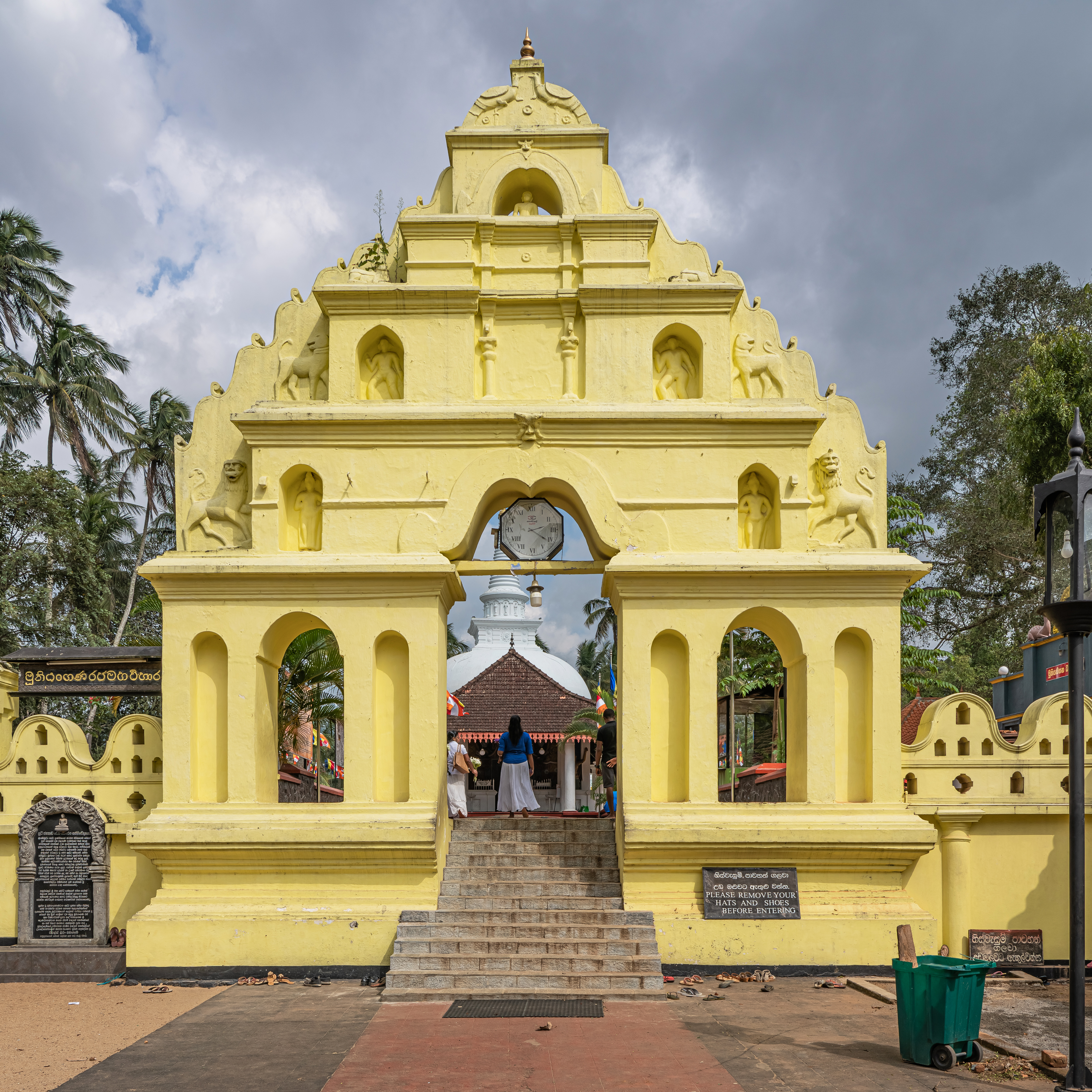
Thorana

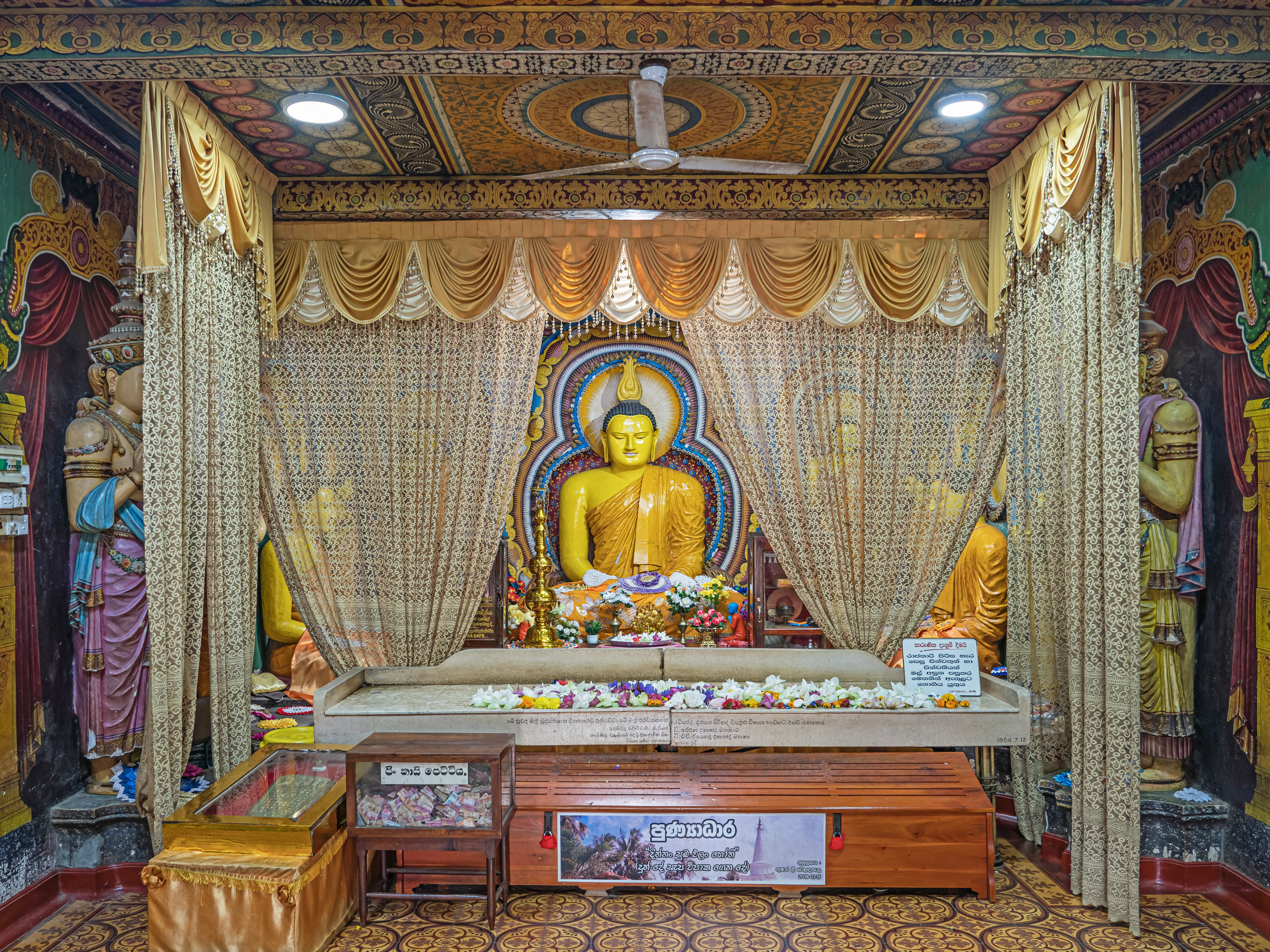
Shrine room of the temple

The site consists of (a) Thorana (b) Makara thorana (c) Main image house (d) Center image house (e) Sath sathi viharaya (f) Statue of deity Indaka (g) Statue of Maithri Bodhisathva (h) Stupa and (i) Bo trees (Bodhi).

=== Thorana ===
This thorana (pandol) is at the entrance to the temple. It has six levels and Makara (dragon) is visible on the second level.

=== Makara thorana ===
This has been built at the entrance to the main image house.

=== Image houses ===
There are two image houses – main and center. Ancient appearance of these two buildings has been vanished due to refurbishment in 1960's and 1970's.

=== The stupa ===
The present stupa was constructed with the height of 65 feet (19.8 m) and diameter of 270 feet (82.3 m) on the ruins on ancient one in 1956.

=== Bo trees ===
There are four Bo trees (Bodhi) remaining in the temple. One is named after Maliyadeva Thera, a disciple believed to be the last one who had attained the state of Arhant in Sri Lanka. Another Bo tree is called Ananda bodiya as it had been brought from Jetavana monestey in Sravasti in India wherein a Bo tree with the same name still remains. Another Bo tree which remains in this site has been considered as it originated from Jaya Sri Maha Bodhi and planted by King Devanampiya Tissa.

=== Procession ===
An attractive procession (Perahera) will be held at site annually.
