= Nawagamuwa Pattini Devalaya =

Temple in Nawagamuwa, Sri Lanka

- නවගමුව පත්තිනි දේවාලය
- Marble statue of Goddess Pattini

Religion
- Affiliation: Buddhism
- District: Colombo
- Province: Western Province
- Deity: Pattini

Location
- Location: Nawagamuwa, Sri Lanka
- Interactive map of Nawagamuwa Pattini Devalaya
- Coordinates: 06°55′26.93″N 80°1′4.9″E

Architecture
- Type: Devalaya
- Founder: Gajabahu I of Anuradhapura (traditional belief)

Nawagamuwa Pattini Devalaya is a historic temple situated in Nawagamuwa in Colombo District, Sri Lanka. Considering its importance in historical, architectural and anthropological facets, the Archaeological Department has declared the Devalaya as a protected monument in the country.

Nawagamuwa also inherits archeological sites that dates back to BC period as per archaeological research conducted in the area. The Devalaya is popular among the masses for its miracles and to receive the blessings of the goddess Pattini. Also many Sri Lankan pregnant mothers go there to get a blessing from the goddess Pattini to their unborn child.

== Legends ==
The legend has it that King Gajabahu I (114−136) on his return from India victoriously with 12,000 men as prisoners, also brought with him the Pattini anklet. The king built the Devalaya enshrining the Pattini anklet at a place where he stopped to rest on his return to Anuradapuara. A different presentation of the legend says that the Goddess Pattini came from India with 12,000 devotees form 16 castes and settled in this area. Another legend says that it was started by Neelaperumal Pandaram who came down from Kerala.

== History ==
Verifiable historical evidence about the Devalaya emerged during the Kotte period. The area was then known as Hewagam Korale, according to Rajaveliya. Excavations around the Devale from time to time unearthed building materials, wells, Dutch coins and iron implements of the Middle Ages. North of the old Devalaya at what was known as the old landing place, coins used during the Dutch period in Ceylon, 1554–1765, have been found. Significant events took place during Kotte Period

- Inauguration of Hewagam Korale by King Rajasinha I of Sitawaka as a gratitude to the soldiers of Hewagama who fought with him against the Portuguese in the Battle of Mulleriyawa.
- Godagama Sannasa mentions the gift of oil presented to Nawagamuwa Pattini Perahera by King Buwanekabahu V (1521–1580)
- King Mayadunne of Sitawaka (1521–1580) had stopped at the Nawagamuwa Pattini Devale to make a vow before he went to war with the Portuguese in the Colombo Fort.
- Portuguese records reveal that, in 1550, the king of Portugal sent 600 troops to help Bhuvanaikabahu VII of Kotte. They clashed with King Mayadunne at Nawagamuwa.
- In 1576, the Portuguese records say that they made a military establishment on the place after destroying the Devalaya.
- King Mayadunne recaptured the lost land and rebuilt the Devalaya.
- The Captain of the Colombo Fort again destroyed the Devalaya and left a pile of ruins.

== Festivals ==
The major festival of the Nawagamuwa Pattini devalaya is the ‘Gonpita Perahera’ held in August each year. This traditional ceremony has been conducted for the past 1500 years in honour of Goddess Pattini, to invoke blessings on the village. The villages rear white bulls exclusively to take part in the annual Perahera Festival.

== Restorations ==
The Procession of the marble statue of Goddess Pattini arriving to Nawagamuwa Devalaya

Archeological research has revealed that there are buildings in Nawagamuwa Devalaya premises belonging to both the Kotte Period and the 19th century. The 19th-century restorations and buildings were done by Katuwawala Sri Sumanatissa Thero, the chief priest of the temple during 1813–1928. After constructing the Galkanu devale, Sri Sumanatissa Himi constructed the monks' abode or Sanghavasaya and the Vihare or Pilimage in 1894.

After the restoration of the Devalaya in the 1813–1928 period, the Devalaya has not had any restoration until the New Millennium. In 2016, nearly 100 years later, the Devalaya went through a complete restoration, under the guidance of the Department of Archeology. The restoration includes, wood-work using the exact type of Jak trees (that yielded honey-sweet fruits) used by original builders, in addition to copper sheet roofing and granite flooring. The restoration cost 30 million rupees to complete. The project was funded by the Nandana Lokuwithana Foundation. With the new renovation project, a life-size marble statue of Goddess Paththini was brought from India to Nawagamuwa. It was unveiled to the public ceremonially on 19 August 2016.

== Conservation ==
The department has declared eight archeologically important sites as protected monuments to be conserved

1. Shrine Room (Pilimage)
2. The Monks’ Abode (Sanghavasaya)
3. Stone Pillar (Galkanu) Devalaya
4. Maha Pattini Devalaya
5. Vishnu Devalaya
6. Kataragama Devalaya
7. Dedimunda Devalaya
8. The grove of ancient Na trees (which is over 100 years old).
