= Badulla =

Badulla බදුල්ල
- City
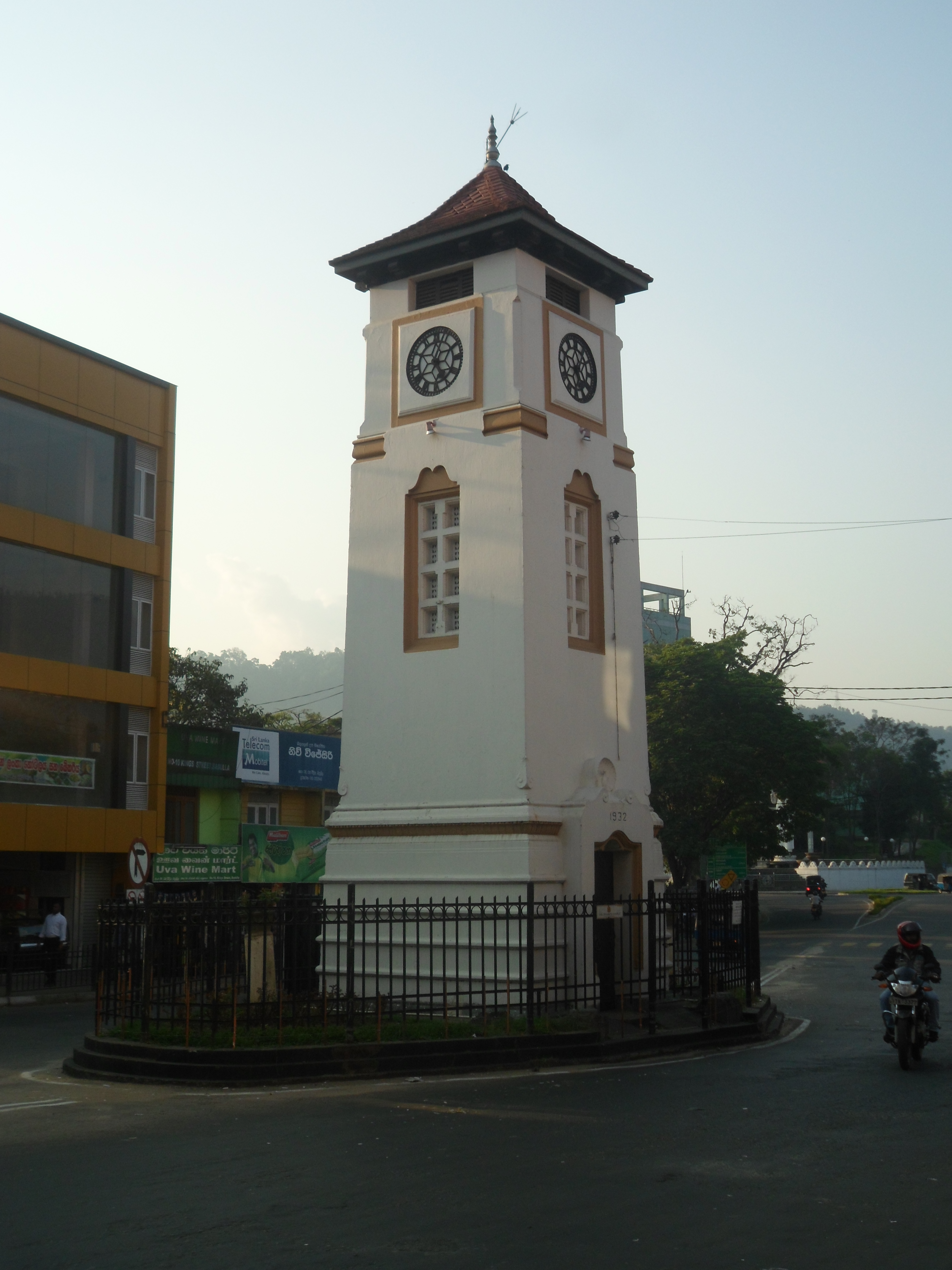
- Badulla clock tower

- Location within Sri Lanka
- Coordinates: 6°59′5″N 81°3′23″E
- Country: Sri Lanka
- Province: Uva Province
- District: Badulla

Government
  - Type: Municipal Council

Area
  - Total: 10 km^{2} (3.9 sq mi)
- Elevation: 680 m (2,230 ft)

Population (2011)
  - Total: 47,587
  - Density: 4,387/km^{2} (11,360/sq mi)
- Time zone: UTC+5:30 (Sri Lanka Standard Time Zone)

Badulla (Sinhala: බදුල්ල, IPA: [bəd̪ulːə]; Tamil: பதுளை,IPA: [bɐðuɭɐi̯]) is the capital and the largest city of Uva Province situated in the central hills of Sri Lanka. It is the capital city of Uva Province and the Badulla District.

== Geography ==
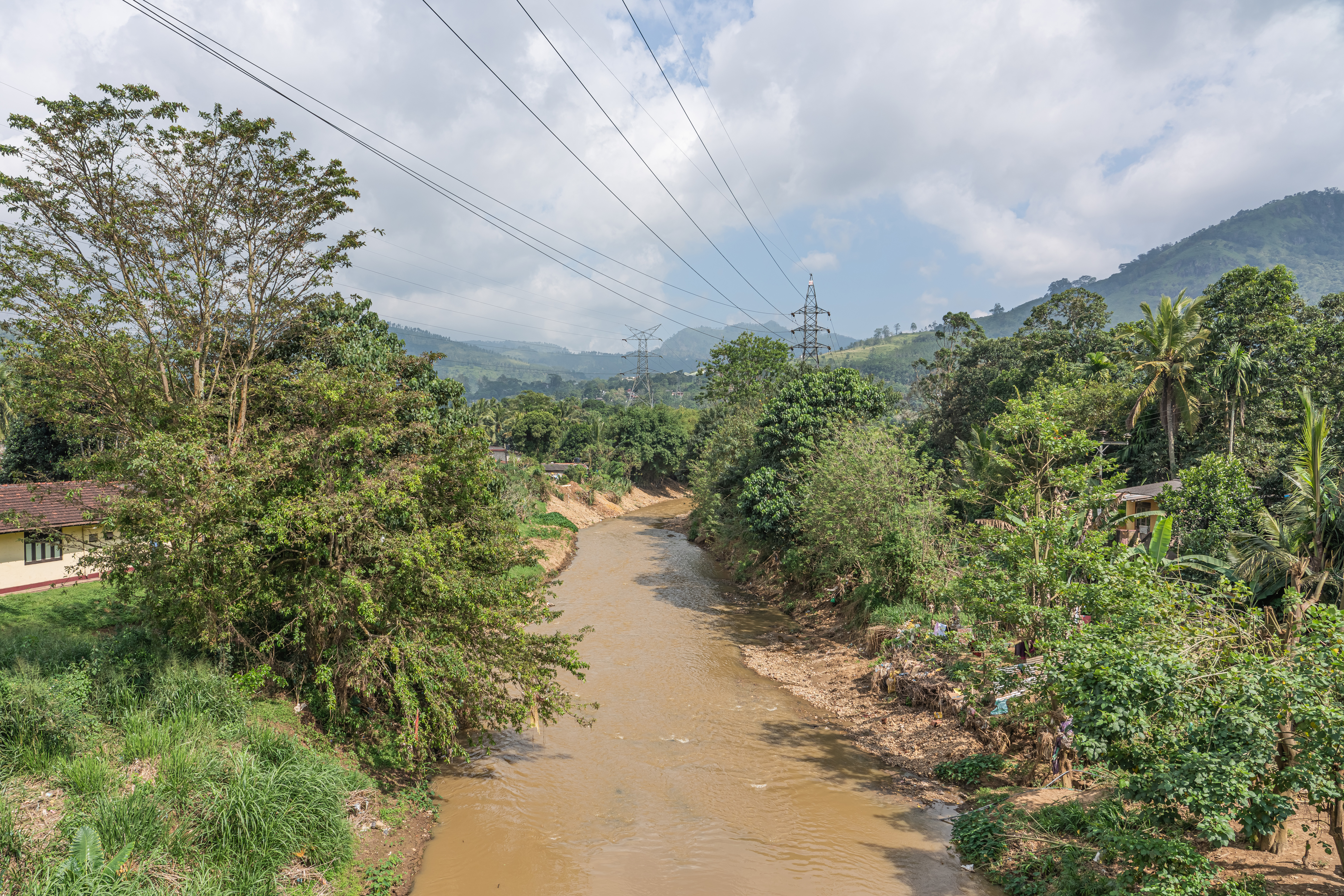
Badulu Oya

Badulla is located in the southeast of Kandy, almost encircled by the Badulu Oya River, about 680 m (2,230 ft) above sea level and is surrounded by tea plantations. The city is overshadowed by the Namunukula range of mountains (highest peak 2,016 m (6,614 ft) above sea level). It was a base of a pre-colonial Sinhalese local prince (regional king) who ruled the area under the main King in Kandy before it became part of the British Empire. Later, it became one of the provincial administrative hubs of the British rulers. The city was the terminus of upcountry railway line built by the British in order to take mainly tea plantation products to Colombo.

=== Climate ===
Badulla has a tropical monsoon climate (Köppen: Am) characterized by mild temperatures (18 °C-26 °C) and a significant amount of rainfall. Badulla has a wet season from October to January, and has cooler temperatures in December to February compared to the rest of the year.

Climate data for Badulla, elevation 670 m (2,200 ft), (1991–2020)
Month	Jan	Feb	Mar	Apr	May	Jun	Jul	Aug	Sep	Oct	Nov	Dec	Year
Record high °C (°F)	31.2 (88.2)	32.8 (91.0)	34.8 (94.6)	36.2 (97.2)	35.2 (95.4)	35.1 (95.2)	35.3 (95.5)	35.5 (95.9)	36.0 (96.8)	35.2 (95.4)	31.7 (89.1)	30.5 (86.9)	36.2 (97.2)
Mean daily maximum °C (°F)	25.5 (77.9)	27.2 (81.0)	29.7 (85.5)	30.6 (87.1)	31.1 (88.0)	31.1 (88.0)	31.1 (88.0)	31.2 (88.2)	30.7 (87.3)	29.2 (84.6)	27.2 (81.0)	25.6 (78.1)	29.2 (84.6)
Daily mean °C (°F)	21.6 (70.9)	22.3 (72.1)	23.7 (74.7)	24.9 (76.8)	25.4 (77.7)	25.2 (77.4)	25.0 (77.0)	25.0 (77.0)	24.7 (76.5)	24.1 (75.4)	23.1 (73.6)	22.1 (71.8)	23.9 (75.0)
Mean daily minimum °C (°F)	17.7 (63.9)	17.5 (63.5)	17.7 (63.9)	19.3 (66.7)	19.6 (67.3)	19.2 (66.6)	18.9 (66.0)	18.7 (65.7)	18.7 (65.7)	18.9 (66.0)	19.1 (66.4)	18.6 (65.5)	18.7 (65.7)
Record low °C (°F)	10.4 (50.7)	8.0 (46.4)	9.7 (49.5)	13.2 (55.8)	12.6 (54.7)	15.1 (59.2)	15.2 (59.4)	14.4 (57.9)	14.4 (57.9)	12.7 (54.9)	13.7 (56.7)	10.8 (51.4)	8.0 (46.4)
Average precipitation mm (inches)	183.6 (7.23)	102.3 (4.03)	87.6 (3.45)	183.5 (7.22)	120.0 (4.72)	51.6 (2.03)	54.0 (2.13)	72.2 (2.84)	106.7 (4.20)	242.1 (9.53)	285.7 (11.25)	269.9 (10.63)	1,759.1 (69.26)
Average precipitation days (≥ 1.0 mm)	11.7	8.1	7.2	12.8	10.1	5.0	4.9	6.4	8.8	15.1	18.7	17.0	125.9
Source: NOAA

== History and present day ==
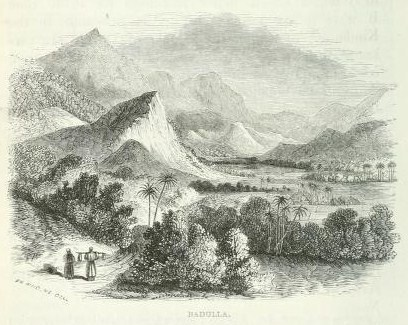
Plate from Ceylon, Physical, Historical and Topographical, titled "The Coffee Regions. Badulla"

Badulla was an isolated village until the British built roads from Kandy and Nuwara Eliya in the mid 19th century, as part of the growing plantation economy. By the 20th century Badulla had become a regional hub, with the British establishing it as the capital of Uva Wellassa, now known as the Uva Province. Badulla has a number of British colonial buildings, including the Badulla railway station, St Mark's Church and the Old Welekade Market. Badulla district is one of the leading tea producing districts, second only behind the Nuwara-Eliya District.

The town has grown steadily since the country's independence from approximately 13,000 in 1946, to 38,000 in 1977 and 47,587 in 2011.

Badulla is a multi-national city with the ancient Muthiyangana Temple situated in its heart. The Catholic Church has a diocese headquartered here.

== Transport ==
=== Road ===
Badulla is about 230 km (140 mi) away from Colombo towards the eastern slopes of the central hills of Sri Lanka. There are multiple routes to Badulla from Colombo, Kandy and Galle. From Colombo, one can travel via Ratnapura, Balangoda, Haputale, Bandarawela and Hali Ela along A4 and A16 to Badulla, which may take 5–6 hours. From Kandy there are two routes: either via "Victoria-Randenigala Raja Mawatha" or via Nuwara Eliya (route A5). From Galle, the best route is via Matara, Hambantota, Wellawaya, Ella, Demodara and Hali Ela (route A2).

=== Rail ===
Badulla railway station is the last station on the Main Line and is 292.3 km (181.6 mi) away from Colombo Fort Station.

== Tourist attractions ==
- Muthiyangana temple is an ancient Buddhist temple located in the middle of Badulla. It is regarded as one of the Solosmasthana, the sixteen sacred places in Sri Lanka, believed by Buddhists to have been visited by Gautama Buddha.
- Badulla Kataragama Devalaya is an ancient devalaya, situated in Badulla town. It is a shrine dedicated to Sinhalese deity Kataragama deviyo.
- Old Welekade Market is a historic building, built in 1889.
- Dunhinda Falls, a 64-metre-high (210 ft) waterfall, is located five kilometres (three miles) north of Badulla. This is one of the most popular waterfalls of Sri Lanka, mentioned in several famous songs and works of literature. It draws many local and foreign tourists to the region.
- Bogoda ancient wooden bridge is one of the oldest surviving wooden bridges in the country (being over 400 years old) and is located 13 kilometres (8.1 mi) south of Badulla, close to the town of Hali-ela.
- St Mark's Church was the first church to be consecrated (25 April 1857) by the first Bishop of Colombo Rev. James Chapman.

== Demographics ==
Ethnicity	Population	% of total
Sinhalese	52,546	70.02
Sri Lankan Moors	7,031	9.37
Sri Lankan Tamils	3,729	4.97
Indian Tamils	10,980	14.63
Other (including Burgher, Malay)	756	1.01
Total	75,042	100

== See also ==
- List of cities in Sri Lanka
- List of Archaeological Protected Monuments in Badulla District
