= Badulla District =

Badulla District බදුල්ල දිස්ත්‍රික්කය பதுளை மாவட்டம்
- Administrative District
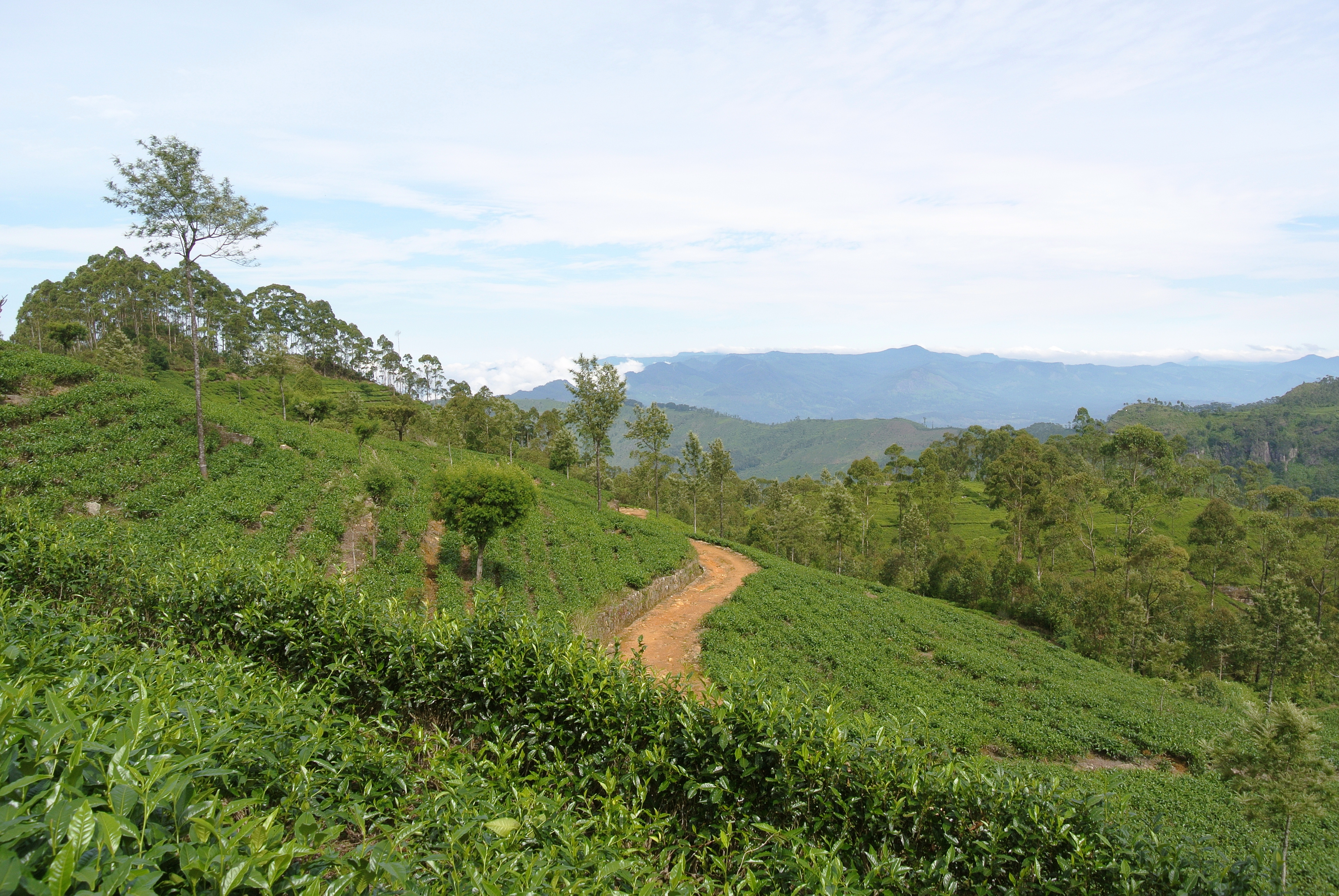
- Tea plantation in Haputale

- Map of Sri Lanka with Badulla District highlighted

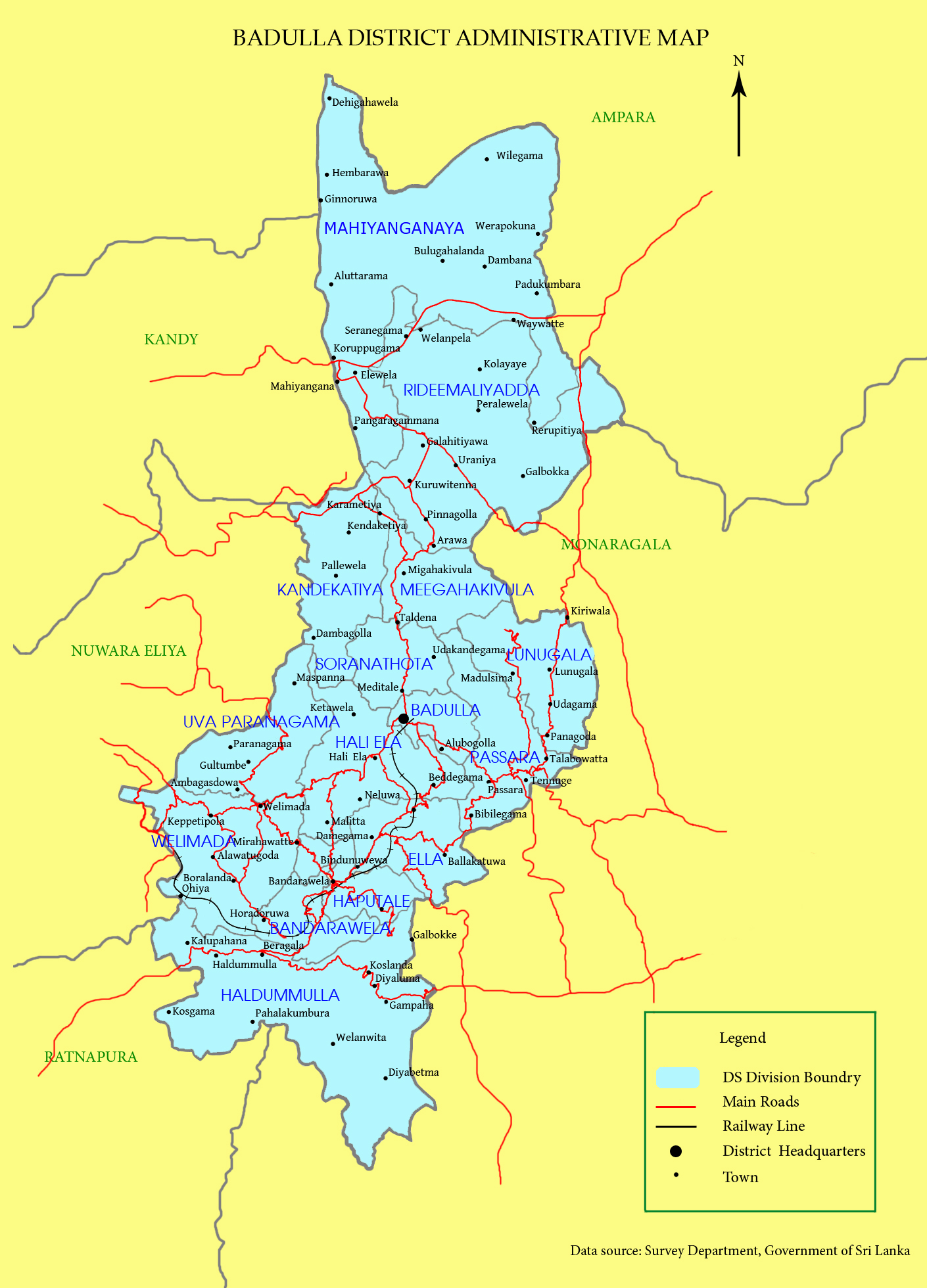
- Map of Badulla district showing its administrative areas
- Coordinates: 6°59′05″N 81°03′23″E
- Country: Sri Lanka
- Province: Uva Province
- Largest City: Badulla
- Divisions: List: Divisional Secretariats: Grama Niladhari:

Government
  - District Secretary: P.S.P.Abeywardhane

Area
  - Total: 2,861 km^{2} (1,105 sq mi)

Population (2024)
  - Total: 871,763
  - Density: 304.7/km^{2} (789.2/sq mi)
- Time zone: UTC+05:30 (Sri Lanka)
- ISO 3166 code: LK-81
- Languages: Sinhala, Tamil, English
- Website: http://www.badulla.dist.gov.lk/index.php/en/ds.gov.lk/dist_badulla

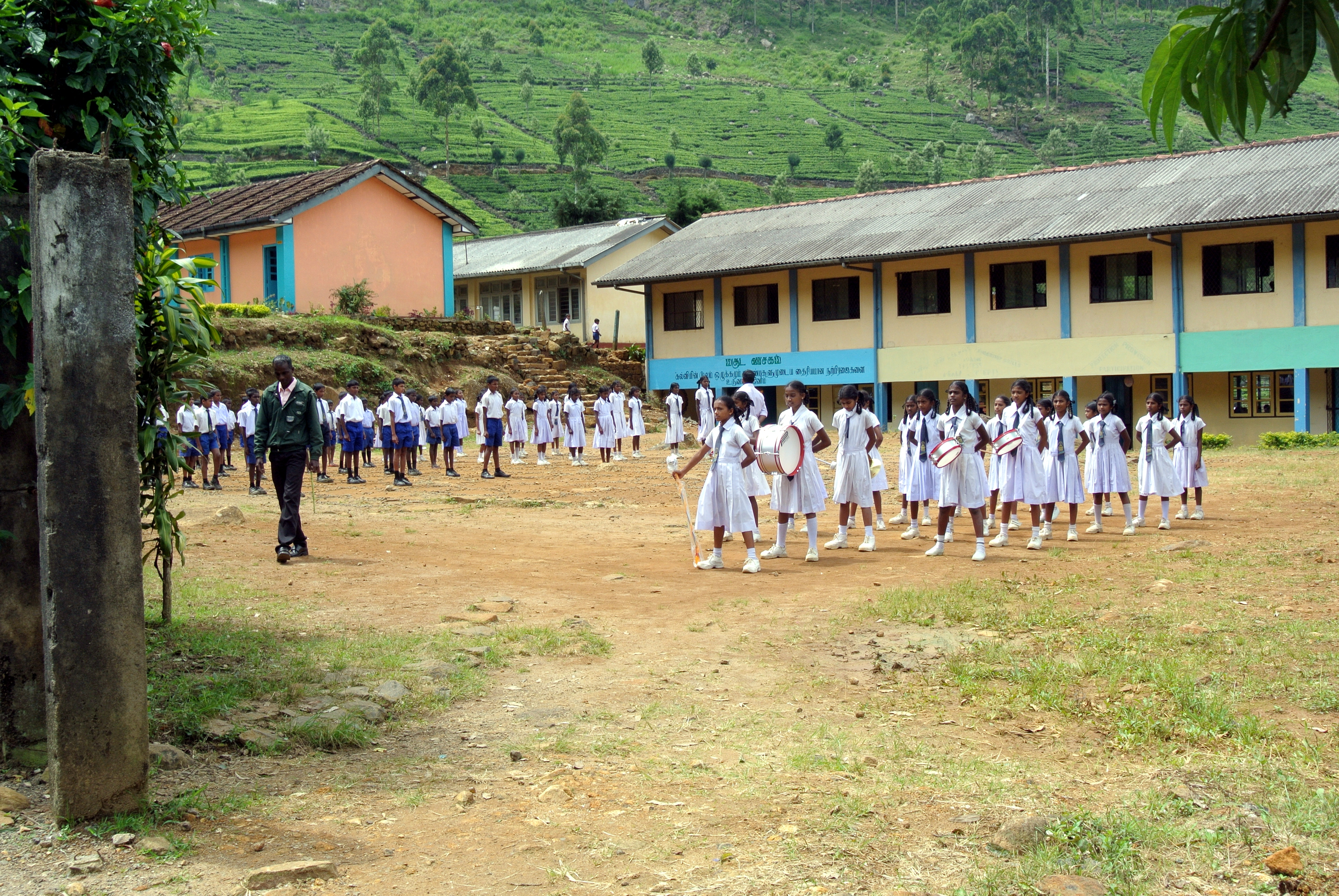
A school in Badulla district

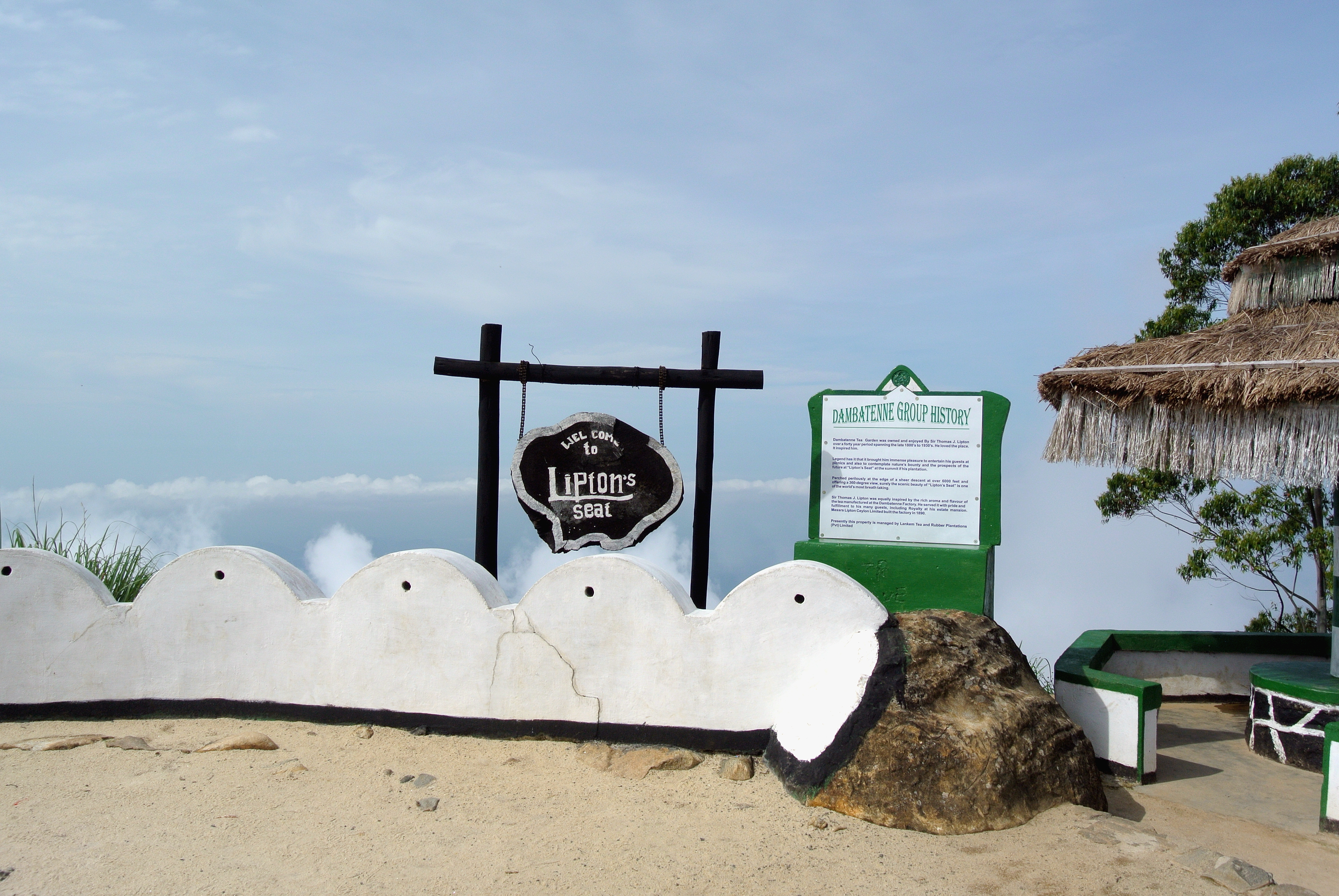
Lipton's Seat

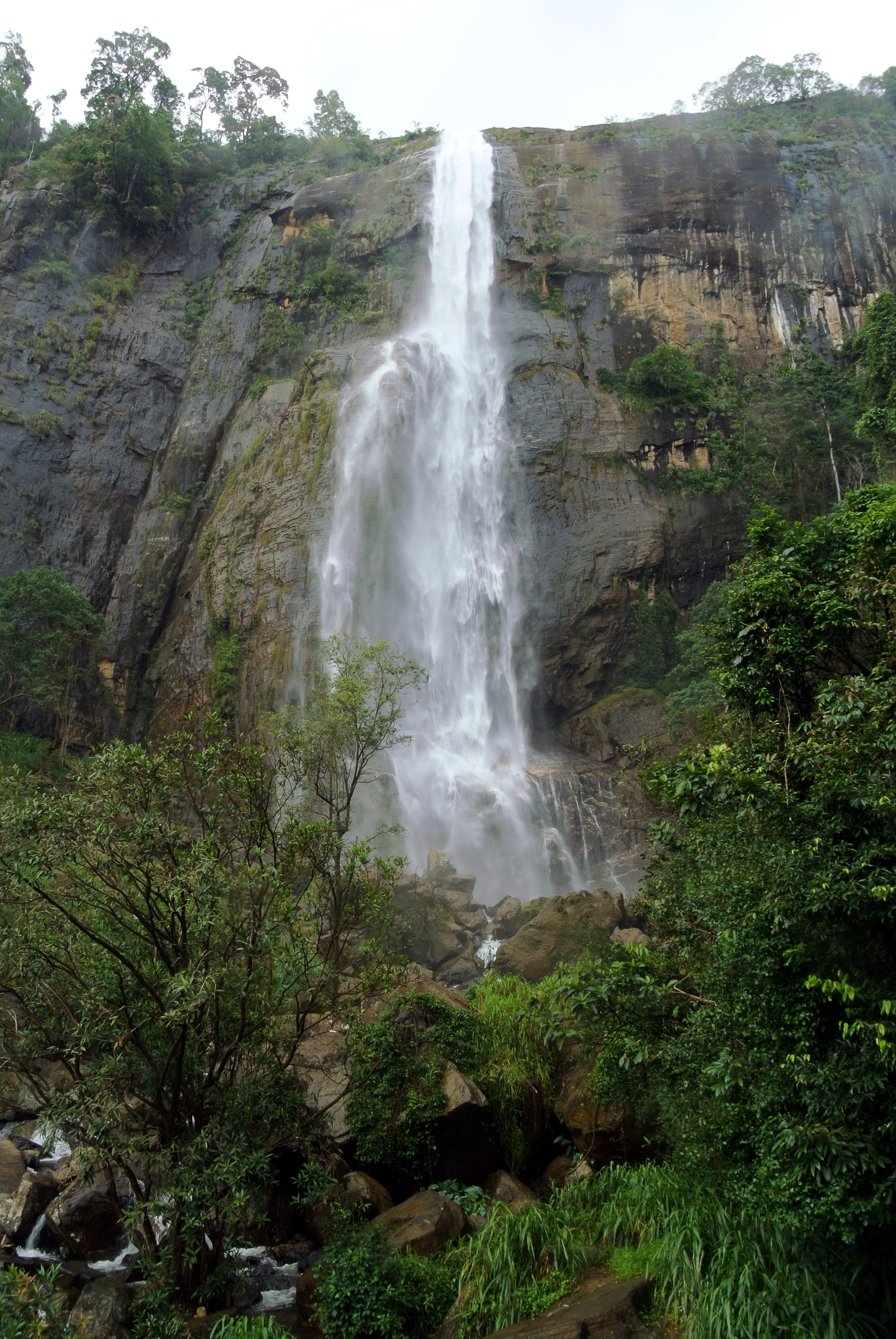
Diyaluma Falls

Badulla District (Sinhala: බදුල්ල දිස්ත්‍රික්කය badūlla distrikkaya; Tamil: பதுளை மாவட்டம் Patuḷai māvaṭṭam) is a district in Uva Province, Sri Lanka. The entire land area of the Badulla district is 2,861 km^{2} (1,105 sq mi) and has a total population of 871763 as of 2024. The district is bounded by the Kandy district to the North and by Nuwara Eliya and Matale districts to the West. The South-Eastern border creates with the districts of Rathnapura, Monaragala & Ampara. Mainly the economy of the district is based on agricultural farming and livestock.

Badulla District is an agricultural district where tea and various vegetables are cultivated. The district is divided into an upper region and a lower region which differ in climatic and geographic characteristics. The upper region of the district is known for tea plantations and vegetable cultivation while the lower region focuses more on paddy farming.

== Education ==
=== Universities ===
- Uva Wellassa University

=== Schools ===
Badulla

- Uva College, Badulla
- Dharmadutha College Badulla
- Badulla Central College
- Vishaka Girls High School Badulla
- Viharamahadevi Girls School Badulla
- Saraswathi National School Badulla

Bandarawela

- Bandarawela Central College
- S. Thomas' College, Bandarawela
- St.Joseph's college
- Bandarawela Tamil Central College

Mahiyanganaya

- Mahiyanganaya National school

Passara

- Passara National College
- Passara Tamil Maha Vidyalayam National College
- Sri Ramakrishna College
- Al Adhan Maha Vidyalaya
- Barathy Maha Vidyalayam
- Tamils Girls maha vidyalayam
- Gonakelle Tamil Maha Vidiyalayam

welimada

- Welimada Central Collage

== Electorate divisions in Badulla District ==
- Badulla
- Bandarawela
- Hali-Ela
- Haputale
- Mahiyanganaya
- Passara
- Uva-Paranagama
- Welimada
- Wiyaluwa

=== Major cities ===
- Badulla (Municipal Council)
- Bandarawela (Municipal Council)

=== Major towns ===
- Haputale (Urban Council)

=== Other places ===
- Mahiyanganaya
- Diyatalawa
- Hali-Ela
- Ella
- Haldummulla
- Beragala
- Welimada
- Kandaketiya
- Meegahakivula
- Passara
- Lunugala
- Tennapanguwa
- Kumarapattiya

== Demography ==
Ethnicity in Badulla District (2024)
1. Sinhala (73.4%)
2. Hill Tamils (11.0%)
3. Sri Lankan Tamils (9.38%)
4. Sri Lankan Moors (5.98%)
5. Others (0.23%)

According to the 2024 census, the population of Badulla district was 871,763.

=== Religion ===
Religion in Badulla district (2024)
Religion	Percent
Buddhism	73.02%
Hinduism	19.07%
Islam	6.14%
Catholicism	1.10%
Other Christianity	0.66%
Other or not stated	0.01%

Religions
Buddhism	589,393	(72.63%)
Hinduism	157,360	(19.39%)
Islam	47,172	(5.81%)
Roman Catholic	11,630	(1.43%)
Other Christian	5985	(0.74%)

== Important locations in Badulla District ==
- Muthiyangana Raja Maha Vihara
- Mahiyangana Raja Maha Vihara
- Army Garrison Town, Diyatalawa
- Namunukula Mountain Range
- Lipton's Seat and Adisham Bungalow in Haputale
- Railway bridge and Railway line in Demodara
- Dunhinda, Babarakanda, Diyaluma and Ravana Ella Waterfalls
- Bogoda Wooden Bridge
- Ella tourist town
- Indigenous Vedda village, Dambana

== See also ==
- History of Uva Province
