= Solosmasthana =

Buddhist sacred places in Sri Lanka

Solosmasthana are 16 sacred places in Sri Lanka, believed by Buddhists to have been hallowed by visits of Gautama Buddha. These places of worship are among the most important religious locations in Sri Lanka, and are located throughout the country. Ancient Buddhist and historical sources of Sri Lanka assert that the Buddha visited the country on three occasions. These three visits are given in some detail in the ancient chronicle Mahavamsa, which describes his journeys to eleven of the Solosmasthana. Other sources such as the Pujavaliya, Samantapasadika and Butsarana also mention these visits.

== History ==
The first visit was made to Mahiyangana in the ninth month after the Buddha attained enlightenment. The Mahavamsa says that he conquered the yakshas there and sent them to an island named Giri, thereby setting the background for the establishment of Buddhism in the country later on, where the Buddha knew that the Dhamma would prevail "in all its glory". The Buddha's second visit to Sri Lanka was made to Nagadipa in the fifth year after attaining enlightenment, where he settled a dispute between Naga kings Chulodara and Mahodara regarding a jeweled chair. In the eighth year after enlightenment, the Buddha made his third and final visit to the country accompanied by 500 bhikkhus. This visit was to Kelaniya and was due to an invitation by a Naga king named Maniakkika, who had asked the Buddha to come to his kingdom during the previous visit. After a discourse on Dharma at Maniakkika's abode, the Mahavamsa records that the Buddha visited Samantakuta, Diva Guhava, Dighavapi, and the places where the Jaya Sri Maha Bodhi, Ruwanwelisaya, Thuparamaya and Sela Cetiya now stand. The Samantapasadika mentions that the Buddha also visited Muthiyangana during this visit. It is possible that the other sites may have been included in Solosmasthana because of the monumental stupas built by Buddhist kings at these locations.

With the decline of the ancient kingdoms of Anuradhapura and Polonnaruwa, most of the Solosmasthana were abandoned. It was not until the 20th century that all of them received the attention of the Sangha and Buddhists in the country and were renovated. A Pali gatha, praising the Solosmasthana, is in use among Buddhists. This gatha, which lists all of the Solosmasthana, is recited especially when making offerings to the Buddha.

== Solosmasthana ==
Name	Pali name (Note: This is the name used to refer to the location in the pali gatha about Solosmasthana.)	Construction	Date	Location	Image
Mahiyangana Raja Maha Vihara	Mahiyanganam	Built during the lifetime of Buddha, it is the first ever stupa to be constructed in Sri Lanka. The temple enshrines a lock of hair given by Buddha to Saman, a local chieftain and later a Buddhist deity, during his first visit to the island, 9 months after attaining enlightenment.	6th century BC	Mahiyangana, Uva	Mahiyangana Raja Maha Vihara
Nagadeepa Purana Viharaya	Nagadipam	Constructed by the two warring Naga kings, Chulodara and Mahodara, on the site where Buddha, during his second visit to Sri Lanka, intervened and mediated in settling a dispute over the possession of a gem-studded throne. This throne was later enshrined in this stupa.	1st century CE	Nagadeepa, Northern Province	Nagadeepa Purana Viharaya
Kelaniya Raja Maha Vihara	Kalyanam	Built by Naga king Maniakkika, the temple, hallowed during the third and final visit of Buddha to Sri Lanka enshrines a gem studded throne on which the Buddha sat and preached.	?	Kelaniya, Western Province	Kelaniya Raja Maha Vihara
Sri Pada සමනළ කන්ද	Padalancanam, Samantakutam	The sacred left footprint imprinted by Buddha on his third visit to Sri Lanka at the apex of the mountain. Vijayabahu I first built resting houses for pilgrims during his reign.	519/520 BC	Ratnapura District, Sabaragamuwa; 6°48′41″N 80°29′59″E	Sri Pada
Diva Guhava (Batatotalena Cave)	Divaguham	Natural. The cave in which Buddha spent the day after placing his footprint on Sri Pada. The place is yet unidentified.	? (Note: Discovered in 1995.)	Sudagala, Sabaragamuwa; 6°48′00″N 80°22′00″E	Diva Guhava
Deegavapi Raja Maha Viharaya දීඝවාපි	Dighavapi	Constructed by Saddha Tissa enshrining relics of the Buddha, at the site where Buddha spent sometime with Arhants absorbed in ecstatic meditation, during his final visit.	137 BC	Ampara District, Eastern Province	Deegavapi Raja Maha Viharaya
Muthiyangana Raja Maha Vihara	Cetiyanca Mutiyanganam	Erected by Devanampiya Tissa enshrining relics of Buddha. The site has been consecrated by Lord Buddha, who spent a few moments absorbed in ecstatic meditation.	?	Badulla, Uva Province	Muthiyangana Raja Maha Vihara
Tissamaharama Raja Maha Vihara	Tissa Mahaviharanca	Built by Kavan Tissa it is one of the largest stupas in Ruhuna. The Silpasena Pirivena has been at this site.	2nd century BC	Tissamaharama, Southern Province; 6°17′00″N 81°17′00″E	Tissamaharama Raja Maha Vihara
Jaya Sri Maha Bodhi ජය ශ්‍රී මහා බොධිය	Bodhi	The southern branch from the Bodhi Tree at Bodh Gaya under which Buddha attained Enlightenment. Planted during the reign of Devanampiya Tissa.	288 BC	Anuradhapura, North Central Province; 8°20′41″N 80°23′48″E	Jaya Sri Maha Bodhi
Mirisawetiya Vihara	Maricavattiyam	Built by Dutugamunu with the relic studded sceptre of the King deposited in the stupa.	2nd century BC	Anuradhapura, North Central Province; 8°20′42″N 80°23′20″E	Mirisawetiya
Ruwanwelisaya	Suvarnamali Maha Ceti	Built by Dutugamunu over an impressive collection of relics.	c. 140 BC	Anuradhapura, North Central Province; 8°21′00″N 80°23′47″E	Ruwanwelisaya
Thuparamaya	Tuparama	A relic shrine, the original structure was built by Devanampiya Tissa. The temple built to contain the right Clavicle of Buddha.	246 BC (Note: Current structure built in 1842.)	Anuradhapura, North Central Province; 8°21′19″N 80°23′46″E	Thuparamaya
Abhayagiri vihāra	Abhayagiri	Constructed on the site of a Jaina temple by Valagamba to commemorate the reconquering of the kingdom from foreign usurpers who had deposed him and occupied the throne for 15 year. The stupa enshrines relics of Buddha and the Tripitaka inscribed in gold leaves.	2nd century BC	Anuradhapura, North Central Province; 8°21′00″N 80°23′00″E	Abhayagiri vihāra
Jetavanaramaya ජේතවනාරාමය	Jetavanam	Construction begun by Mahasena and finished by his successor Sirimeghavanna. The waist-band used by Buddha is said to be enshrined.	4th century BC	Anuradhapura, North Central Province; 8°21′6″N 80°24′13″E	Jetavanaramaya
Sela Cetiya	Sela Caitiyam	Lanja Tissa. The site where Arahat Mahinda Thero met Devanampiya Tissa and converted him to Buddhism. The Urna Roma, the sacred hair relic between the eyebrows, is said to be enshrined in here.	1st century BC	Anuradhapura, North Central Province	
Kiri Vehera	Thathakacaragamakam	First built by King Mahasena, (Note: This is not the Mahasena (275 – 301 AD) who constructed Jetavanaramaya, but a king who had ruled during the Buddha's visit to this area.) the temple enshirnes the golden seat, from which Buddha delivered a sermon, a lock of hair and the royal sword (magul kaduwa) used by Prince Siddhartha to cut off his hair at the time of the Great Renunciation.	3rd century BC	Monaragala, Uva	Kiri Vehera

== See also ==
- Atamasthana
- Cetiya
