= Deva people =

The Deva are a mythical people of Sri Lanka according to the Sanskrit epics. According to the Mahavamsa and Ramayana they lived among the Naga, Yakkha and Raskha. They ousted their arch enemies the Raskha from Sri Lanka, with the help of Vishnu. They were then subsequently conquered by King Ravana of the Raskha. After the Yakkhas had left to live in the mountains and remote dense forests, they met Gautama Buddha who converted them to Buddhism. Deva were the first Indo Aryan migrants to Sri Lanka before Vijaya.

According to the Mahavamsa, Gautama Buddha met the Deva at Mahiyangana. Buddha gave Sumana Saman (A leader of the Deva) a few hairs from his head, which were placed in a golden urn and enshrined in a sapphire stupa. A buddhist monk called Sarabhu is then said to have deposited Buddha's ashes in this Stupa. This stupa is now called the "Mahiyangana Stupa" and can be found in the Anuradhapura museum.

Sumana Saman was a leader of the Deva who came from the central hills of Sri Lanka. Some Sri Lankan Buddhists worship him as a deity. He is said to be the guardian of Samanalakanda.
