= Nainativu Nagapooshani Amman Temple =

- நயினாதீவு நாகபூசணி அம்மன் கோயில்
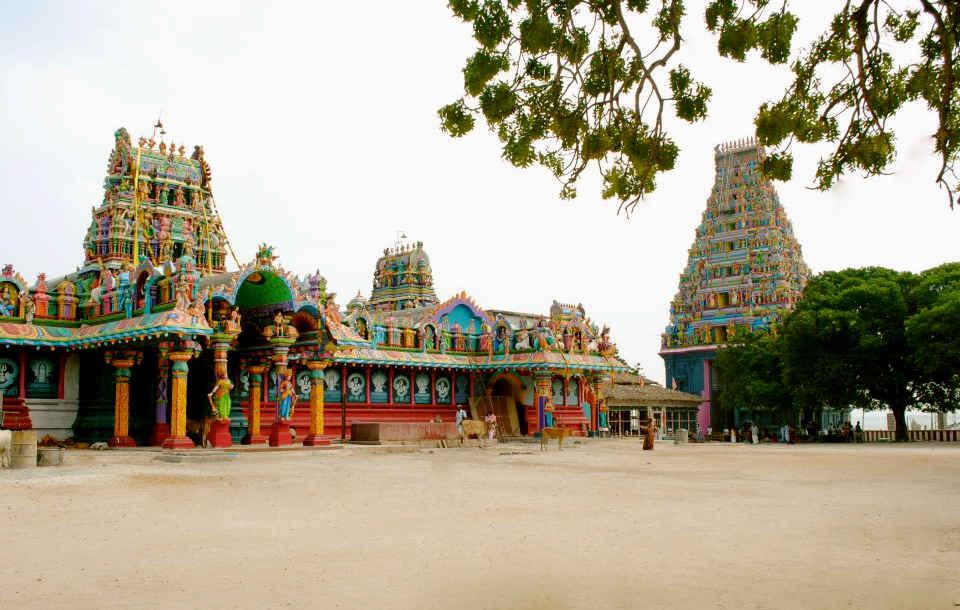

- Location in the Northern Province

Religion
- Affiliation: Hinduism
- District: Theevakam, Jaffna
- Province: Northern
- Deity: Sri Nagapooshani Amman and Sri Nayinaar Swami
- Festivals: Mahostavam (Thiruvizha), Navaratri, Shivaratri, Aadi Pooram
- Governing body: Nainai Nagapooshani Amman Devasthaanams
- Features: Tower: Rajaraja Gopuram; Temple tank: Kailasa-roopa Pushkarani Amrutha Gangadharani Theertham; Temple tree: Banyan Tree

Location
- Location: Nainativu
- Country: Sri Lanka
- Interactive map of Nainativu Nagapooshani Amman Temple
- Coordinates: 9°37′8.6″N 79°46′27.4″E

Architecture
- Type: Dravidian architecture
- Completed: Unknown
- Inscriptions: Tamil Inscription of Parâkramabâhu I

Website
- www.nainainagapooshani.com

Nainativu Nagapooshani Amman Temple (Tamil: நயினாதீவு நாகபூசணி அம்மன் கோயில், romanized: Nayiṉātīvu Nākapūcaṇi Am'maṉ Kōyil) is a Hindu temple on the Palk Bay, in the island of Nainativu, Sri Lanka and is one the 51 Shakta pithas of the goddess. The temple is dedicated to Parvati who is known as Nagapooshani or Bhuvaneswari and her consort, Shiva who is named here as Nayinaar. The temple complex houses four gopurams (gateway towers) ranging from 20–25 feet in height, to the tallest being the eastern Raja Raja Gopuram soaring at 108 feet high. The temple is a significant symbol for the Sri Lankan Tamil people, especially the Jaffneses, and is said to have been mentioned since antiquity in Tamil literature, such as Manimekalai and Kundalakesi. It was built during 1720 to 1790 after the ancient structure was destroyed by the Portuguese in 1620. The temple attracts around 1000 visitors a day, and approximately 5000 visitors during festivals. The annual 16-day Mahostavam (Thiruvizha) festival celebrated during the Tamil month of Aani (June/July) - attracts over 100,000 pilgrims. There are an estimated 10,000 sculptures in this newly renovated temple.

== History ==
=== Literary mentions ===
Naka Nadu was the name of the whole Jaffna Peninsula in some historical documents. There are number of Buddhist myths about the interactions of people of this historical place with Buddha.

=== Inscriptions ===
A 12th century Tamil inscription was found in the temple premises, it contains an edict issued by the Sinhala King Parakramabahu I (1153–1186 A.D) addressed to his local Tamil officials in Jaffna, advising them on how to deal with shipwrecked foreign traders.

The people "snake-worshippers" of Nainativu, spoke Tamil based on Ptolemy's description. The interchangeable names Nayar and Naka or Naga, meaning cobra or serpent were applied to and self described by these snake-worshiping people from classical antiquity. The word Naga was sometimes written in early inscriptions as Naya, as in Nayanika - this occurs in the Nanaghat inscription of 150 BCE. Archaeological excavations and studies provide evidence of Paleolithic inhabitation in the Jaffna and Kerala region. The findings include Naga idols and suggest that serpent worship was widely practised in the Kerala and Jaffna region during the megalithic period. The name Naka as either a corrupted version of the word Nayanar or may have been applied to this community due to their head covering being the shape of a hydra-headed cobra in reverence to their serpentine deities; Sri Naayinar Swami and Sri Nagapooshani Amman. The rulers and society of Nainativu are described as an advanced civilization in the Vallipuram gold plate inscriptions. H. Parker, a British historian and author of "Ancient Ceylon" considers the Naka to be an offshoot of the Nayars of Kerala Many other archaeological inscriptions refer to the Chola-Naka alliance and intermarriage being the progenitor of the Pallava Dynasty of Tamilakam.

On the right side of the South Gopuram entrance is a large life saver-shaped stone - an ancient anchor. Arab ships used to carry such anchors.

== See also ==
Other revered locations of Shakti worship:

- Meenakshi Amman Temple - Madurai
- Kamakshi Amman Temple - Kanchipuram
- Vishalakshi Amman Temple - Kashi
- Nagadeepa Purana Viharaya
