= Maha Saman Devalaya =

Maha Saman Devalaya මහා සමන් දේවාලය
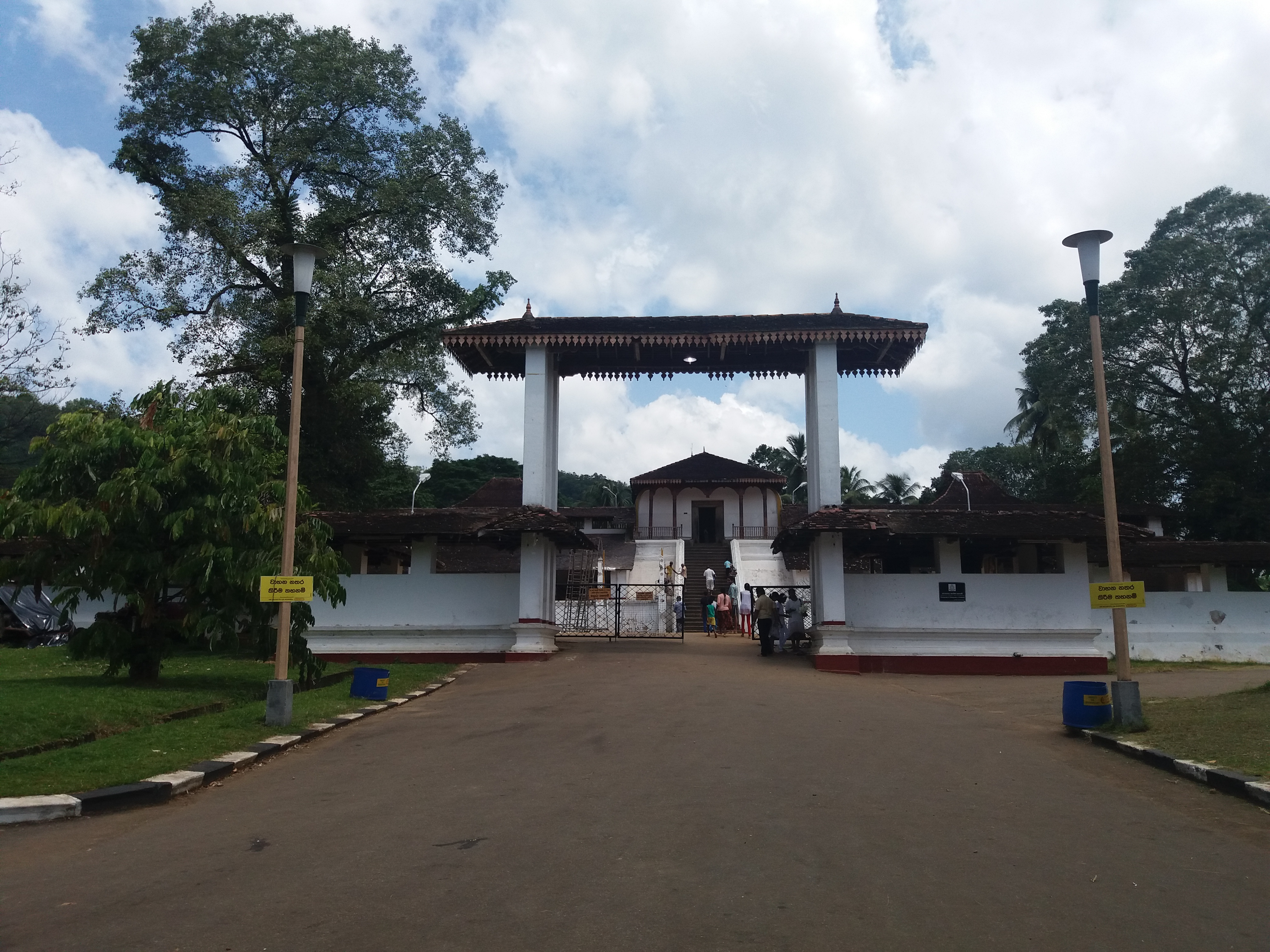

Religion
- Affiliation: Buddhism
- District: Ratnapura
- Province: Sabaragamuwa
- Deity: Saman deviyo

Location
- Location: Ratnapura, Sri Lanka
- Interactive map of Maha Saman Devalaya මහා සමන් දේවාලය
- Coordinates: 06°41′28.1″N 80°22′51.6″E

Architecture
- Type: Devalaya
- Founder: King Parakramabahu II
- Completed: 1270

Maha Saman Devalaya or the Great Saman Temple (also called Sumana Saman Devalaya) is a shrine dedicated to deity Saman, situated at Ratnapura, Sri Lanka who is the presiding deity of the Sri Pada Mountain which is also called Samanthakuta meaning the mountain of Saman which is believed to have the left foot impression of Buddha which he kept in his visit to Sri Lanka.

== Saman Deviyo ==
Considered as one of the guardian gods of Sri Lanka, Deity Saman is deeply venerated in the region of Rathnapura and related areas in the province of Sabaragamuwa of Sri Lanka, he is recorded to have been a district administrator of the region contemporary to Buddha who he met on the former's visit to Sri Lanka.

According to the Mahavamsa the chronicle of ancient Sri Lanka, it is mentioned that the Administrator Saman, attained the first level of enlightenment Sotapanna at the end of the sermon of Buddha. After the demise of Saman, the administrator of Dewa (people) he has started to be venerated as a God or a deity.

== The Shrine ==
It is believed after the demise of Saman, his clan of Deva started to venerate him by erecting a shrine for him. And it's believed there had been a Temple called Saparagama Viharaya, in the same premises in the Anuradhapura era of Sri Lanka, as it's mentioned in Mahavamsa that monks from the said temple attended to the opening ceremony of Ruwanwelisaya of King Dutugamunu.

It is mentioned in 'Saman Siritha' that a monk named Ven. Seelawansa on a pilgrimage to Sri Pada, saw a dream about a statue in the wild and later brought it to the above temple with the help of a minister named Pathirajadeva.

Anyway, the present shrine is said to have built by a court minister in Dambadeniya era of Sri Lanka named Aryakamadeva, in the patronage of King Parakramabahu II, in 1270 AD, as a fulfillment of his vow to erect a shrine in the name of deity Saman, if his effort to find gems is successful. Later King Parakramabahu IV of Kotte Era of Sri Lanka patronized the shrine giving more resources.

Later in the era of Portuguese colonization of Sri Lanka, the said shrine have been captured in 1618 then destroyed and a Portuguese Church have been built. But as King Rajasinghe II of Sitawaka acquired the area, he has rebuilt the shrine destroying the church in 17th century.

The shrine due to the lack of financial strength of King Rajasinghe was rebuilt with much simpler architecture than it used to be. And to this day ((when)) the shrine is made of clay.

== The Perahara(Procession) ==
During the time that Tooth Relic of Buddha was transferred to Delgamuwa Raja Maha Vihara, in a war time, during King Parakramabahu VI's period the Shrine held the Esala Perahara or the Procession of the Tooth Relic for 11 years. Later under King Rajasinghe, the Saman Perahara joined to the Esala Perahara. Since then the Maha Saman Devalaya hoists the Esala Perahara in the month of August–September annually.

Prior to the festival's commencement, age-old rituals like the Pirith ceremony (Chanting of Buddhist Sutras for protection, kap situveema (A symbolical wooden tower being planted) are held and the smaller processions called Kumbal and Dewele Peraheras are held. After that, the Perahara or the main procession takes place, and it concludes with Diya Kapeema (The symbolic water cutting ceremony) all of which are held for 13 days under the supervision of the Chief incumbent(Basnayake Nilame) of the Shrine.

The procession is filled with cultural items and dancing from different regions of Sri Lanka as well as features many elephants decorated in different garments.

The Perahara festival is visited by thousands of people from all over the Sri Lanka as well the world, and while the final perahara is telecasted, all peraharas are online broascasted via YouTube.
