= Mahiyangana Raja Maha Vihara =

Buddhist temple in Sri Lanka

- මහියංගනය රජ මහා විහාරය
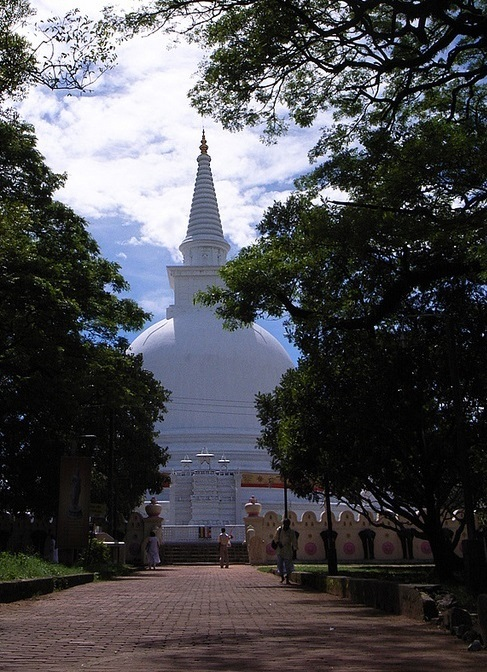
- Mahiyangana Stupa is the first stupa of ancient Sri Lanka

Religion
- Affiliation: Buddhism
- District: Badulla
- Province: Uva Province

Location
- Location: Mahiyangana, Sri Lanka
- Interactive map of Mahiyangana Raja Maha Vihara
- Coordinates: 07°19′19.4″N 80°59′26.9″E

Architecture
- Type: Buddhist Temple

Website
- Official website

Mahiyangana Raja Maha Vihara is an ancient Buddhist temple in Mahiyangana, Sri Lanka. It is believed to be the site of Gautama Buddha's first visit to the country, and is one of the Solosmasthana, the 16 sacred religious locations in Sri Lanka. Currently this temple has been declared as one of archaeological site in Sri Lanka.

== Buddha's visit ==
Historical sources, including the ancient chronicle Mahavamsa, a record that the Buddha visited the Mahiyangana area in the ninth month after he attained enlightenment, which was his first visit to the country. According to the Mahavamsa, Sri Lanka was inhabited by yakshas at the time. It says that the Buddha subdued the yakshas there and held a discourse on Dhamma with them. They were then sent to an island named Giri so that the country would be "purified" and Buddhism could be established there later on, where it would prevail "in all its glory".

== History ==
A Yakka chieftain named Saman (who is now regarded as a deity) attained Sotāpanna (Sovan) after listening to the Buddha's discourse, and asked for a token from the Buddha that they could worship in his absence. The Buddha had given him a handful of hair from his head, which Saman later enshrined in a small stupa, 10 feet (3.0 m) in height. This was the first stupa to be built in Sri Lanka.

According to the Mahawansa, King Devanampiyatissa caused his brother Moolabhaya to deposit the relic of Griwah-Dawtoe (a neck bone) and enlarge it to a height of 30 Cubits.

Several kings have since renovated and enlarged this stupa, including Dutthagamani who raised it to a height of 120 feet (37 m). Other rulers such as Voharika Tissa, Sena II, Vijayabahu I and Kirti Sri Rajasinha have carried out repairs and maintenance work at the temple. In 1942, a society was formed for the renovation of the temple under D. S. Senanayake. Reconstruction work began in 1953 and ended in 1980 with the completion of a new pinnacle for the stupa.

== Images ==
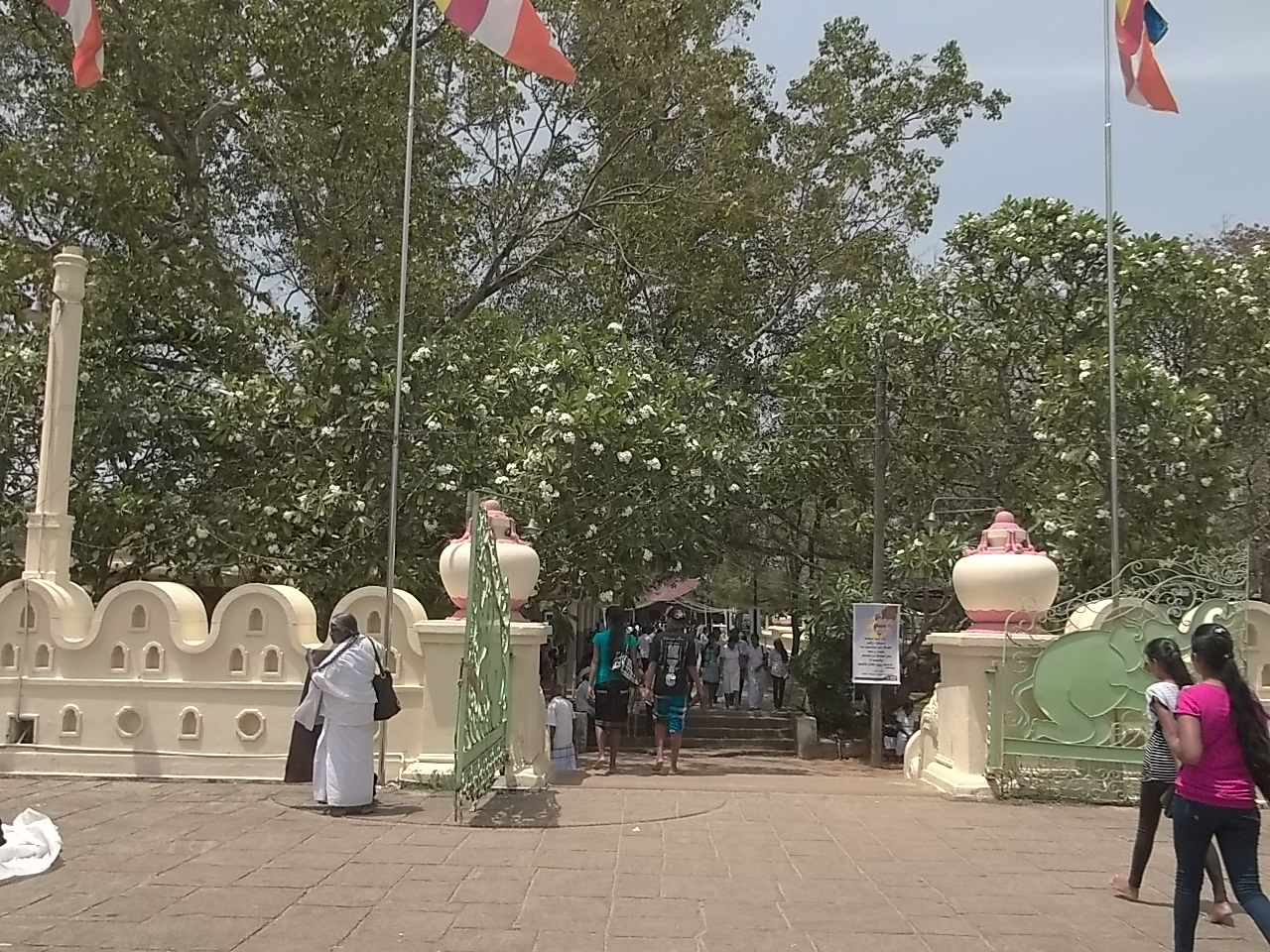
Mahiyangana Raja Maha Viharaya sub gate

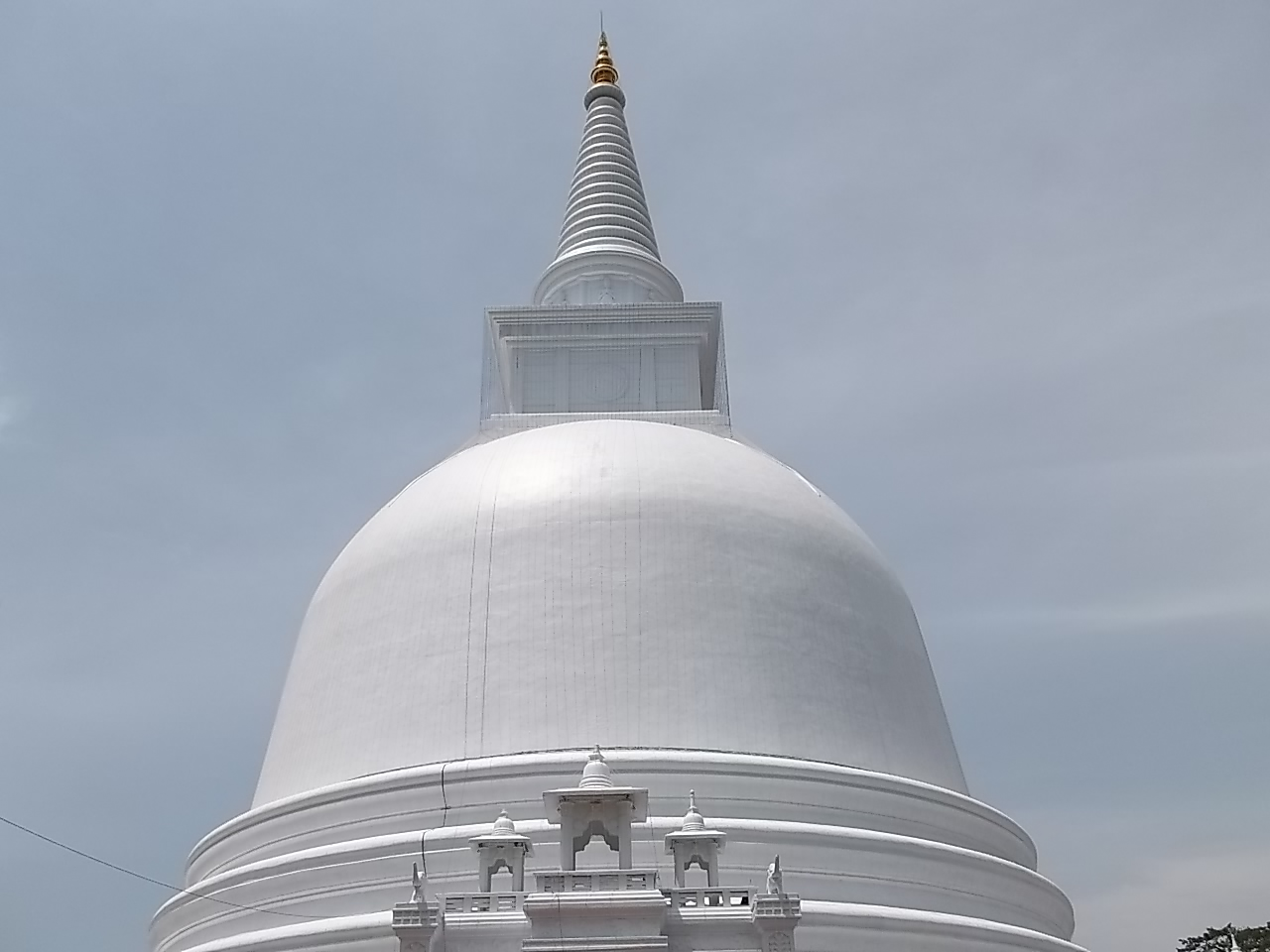
Mahiyangana Pagoda closer look

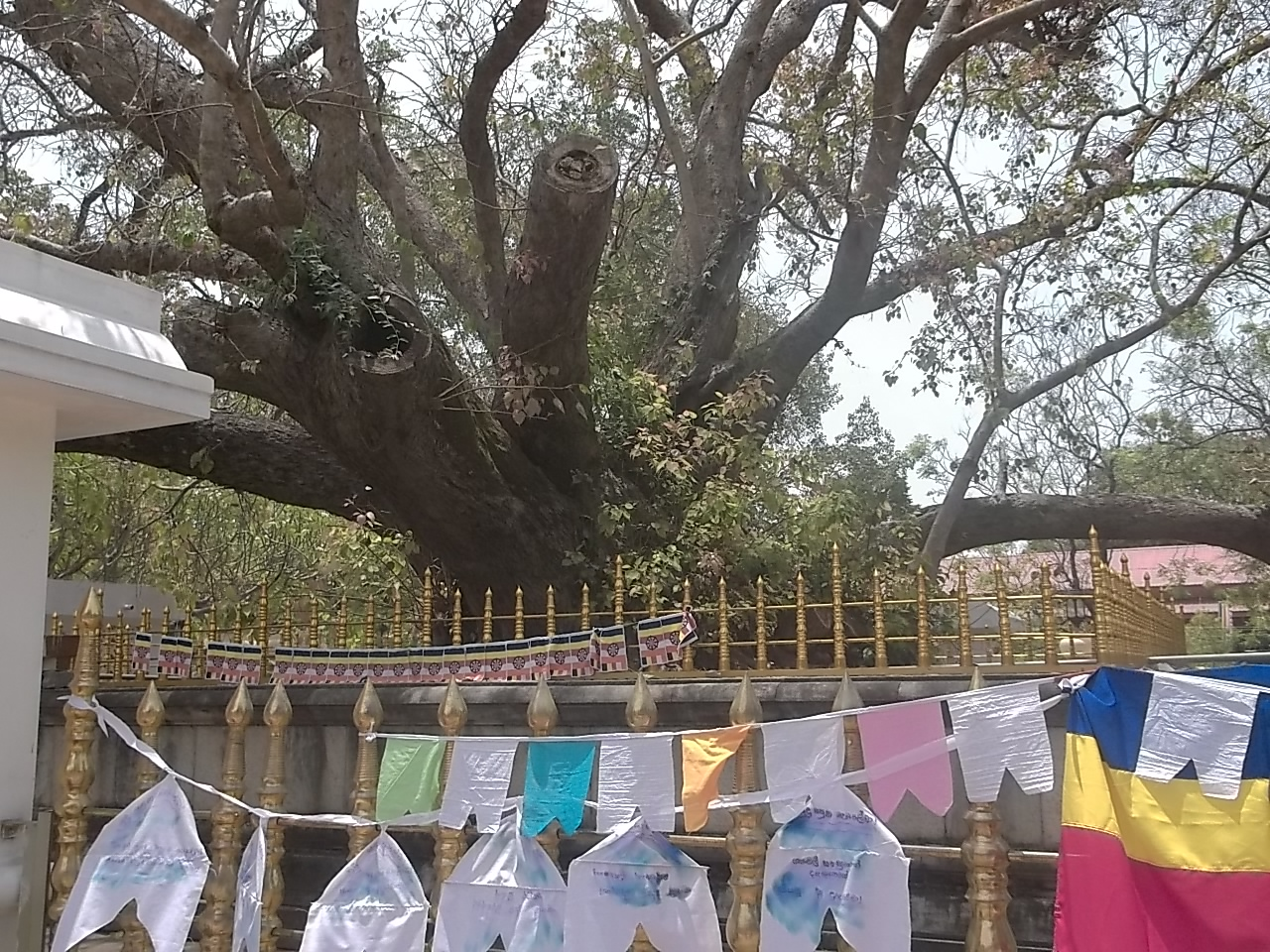
Mahiyangana Viharaya Bodhi Tree

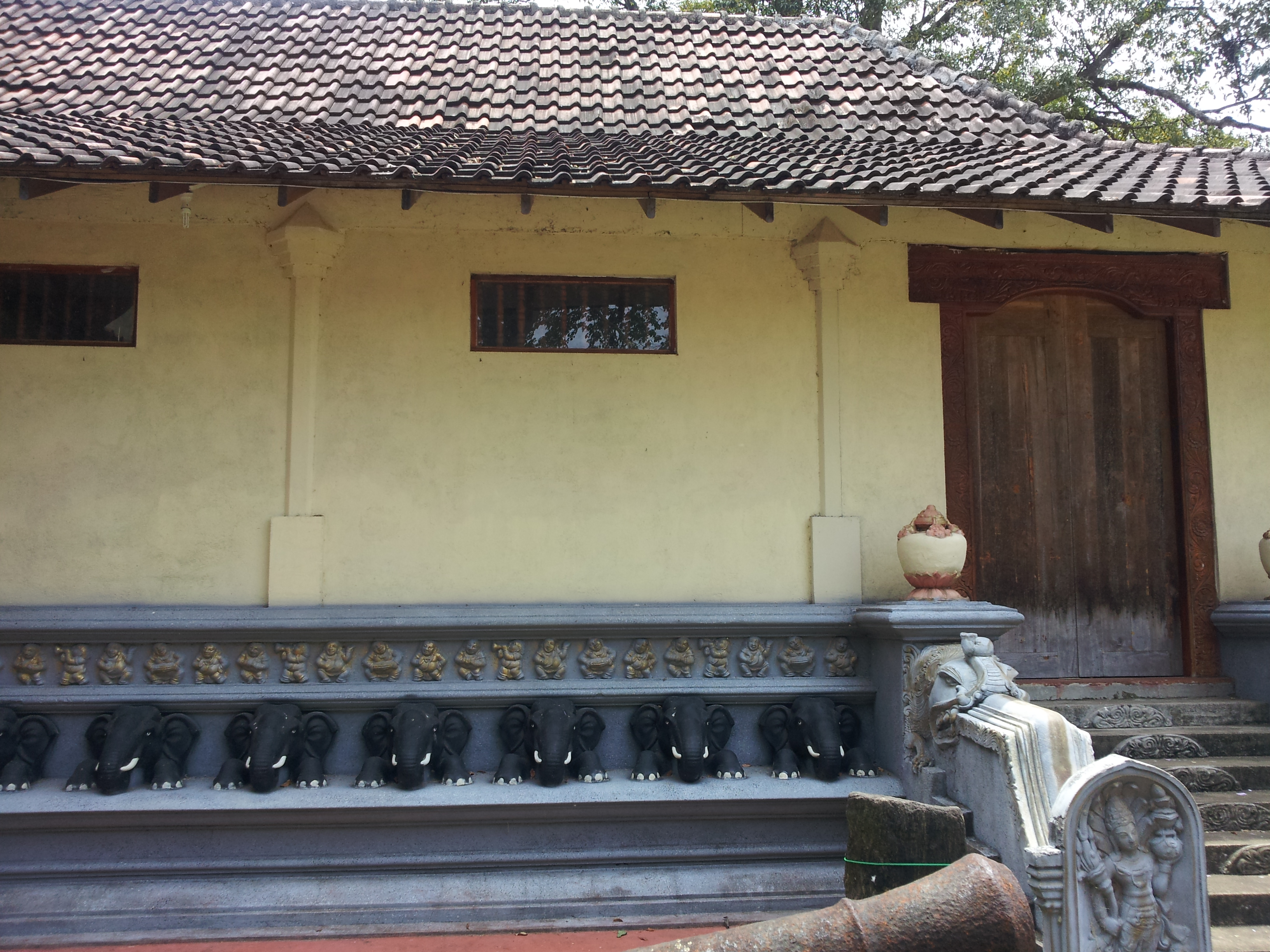
Mahiyangana Museum

== See also ==
- List of Archaeological Protected Monuments in Sri Lanka
