= Ancient clans of Lanka =

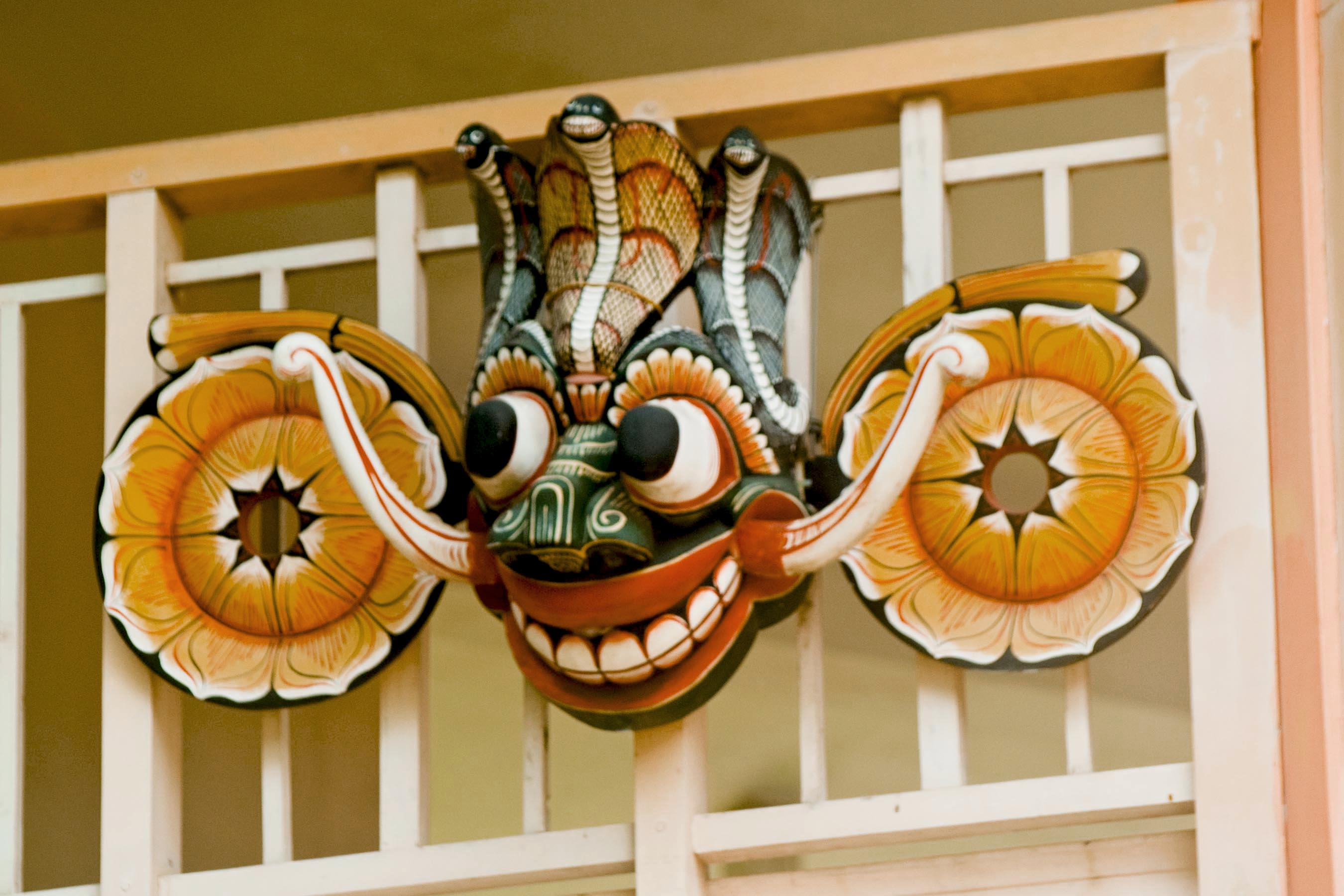
Devil mask and Devil dance are originally from the culture of Yakkas.

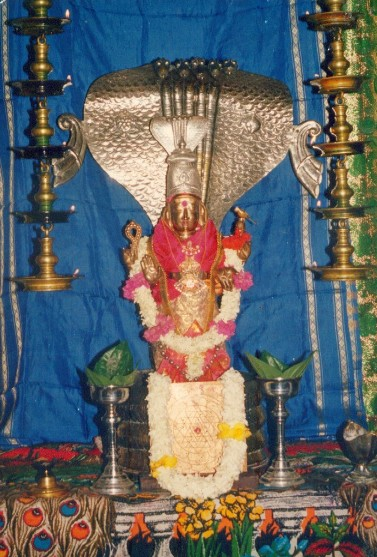
The Worship of snakes deities is popular in Sri Lanka, especially in Nainativu, the historic home of the Nagas.

Several different indigenous clans lived in the island of Sri Lanka during the pre-Vijaya era (before 505 BCE). These clans of Sri Lanka and the mystical kingdom of Lanka were mentioned in the great epics of Mahavamsa, Vargapurnika, Mahabaratha, Manimekalai, Ramayana and Sangams.

== See also ==
- Yaksha kingdom
- Rakshasa kingdom
- Naga people (Lanka)
- Dewa (people)
- Vedda people
- Lanka
- Kuveni
- Yaksha
- Yakkha people (Himalayas)
