= Sela Cetiya =

- අම්බස්තල දාගැබ
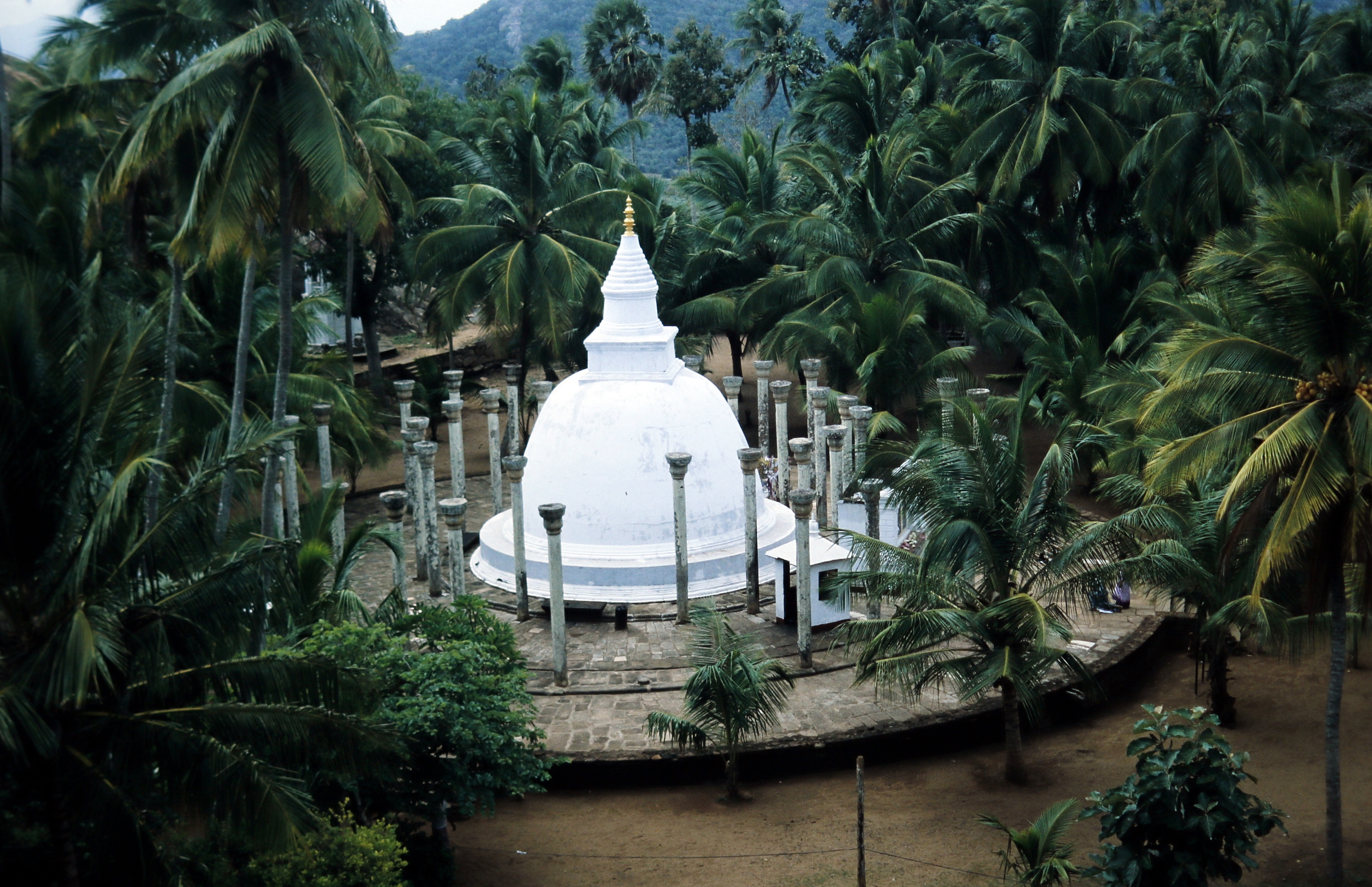
- Ambasthala Dagoba

Religion
- Affiliation: Buddhism
- District: Anuradhapura

Location
- Location: Mihintale, Sri Lanka

Architecture
- Type: Stupa
- Founder: King Mahadatika Mahanaga

The Sela Cetiya, also known as the Ambastala Dagaba, is a significant stupa located at the Mihintale Royal Rock Temple in Sri Lanka. It is one of five stupas within the temple premises and is considered one of the 16 main places of worship, or Solosmasthana.

The stupa is believed to have been constructed by King Mahadatika Mahanaga on the spot where Mahinda Thero met King Devanampiyatissa. This meeting is of historical significance as it marks the introduction of Buddhism to Sri Lanka. The Sela Cetiya is also associated with the Buddha, who is said to have visited this location on his third visit to Sri Lanka. The stupa was built to enshrine the Buddha's hair relic, known as the Urna Roma, located between the eyebrows.

In the 2nd or 3rd century, the stupa was converted to a Vatadage style, a unique architectural feature of ancient Sri Lanka. Most of the pillars from the original wooden roof still stand today.The Sela Cetiya is the first relic encountered upon reaching the upper terrace of the Mihintale Complex, after ascending the 1,840 steps of the ancient monastery. Its historical and religious significance makes it a key feature of the Mihintale Royal Rock Temple.
