= Deeghawapi =

Buddhist shrine

- දීඝවාපි විහාරය
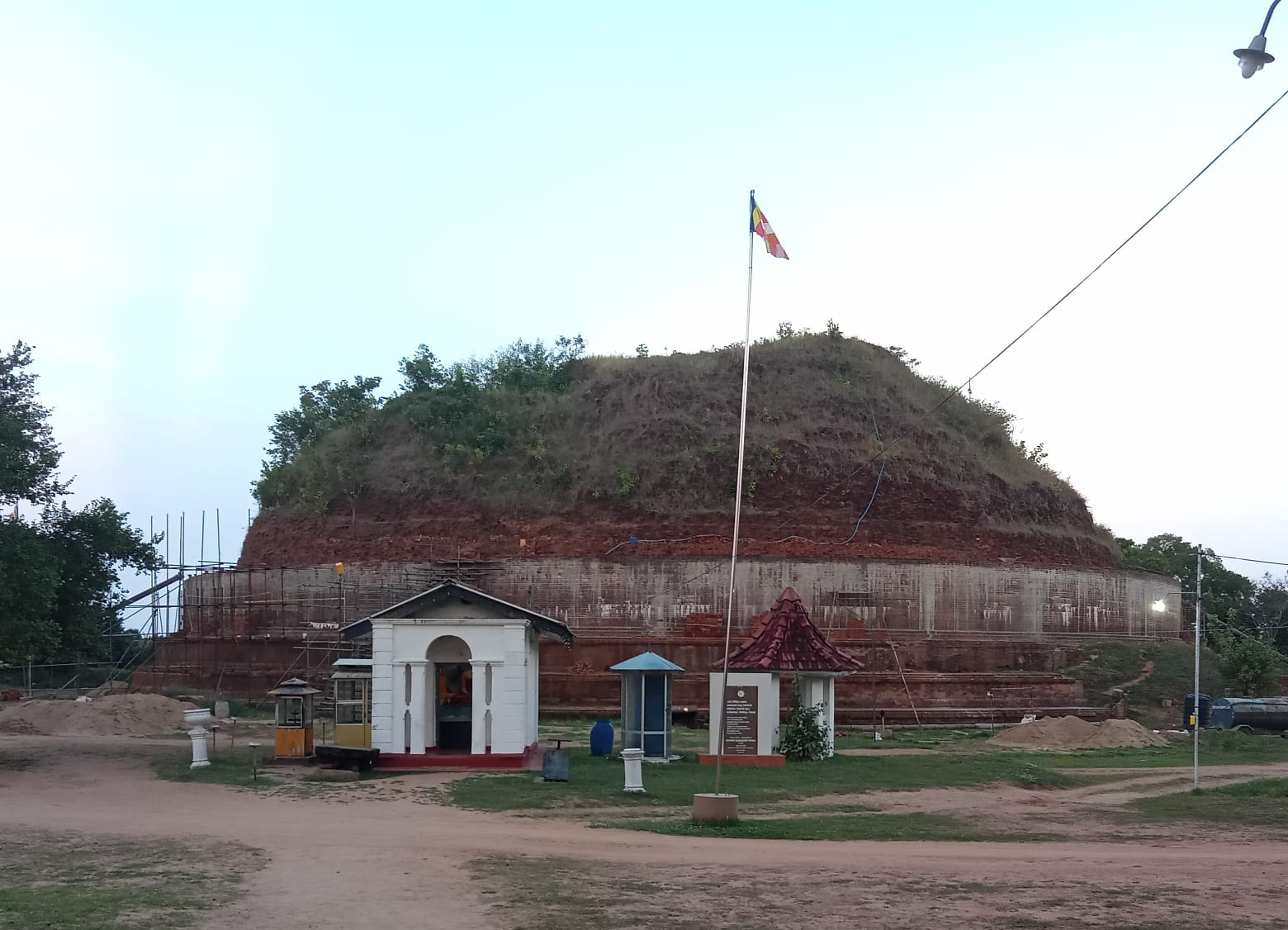
- Deeghawapi stupa in 2021

Religion
- Affiliation: Buddhism
- District: Ampara
- Province: Eastern Province

Location
- Location: Deeghawapi, Sri Lanka
- Interactive map of Deeghawapi
- Coordinates: 07°17′03″N 81°47′12″E

Architecture
- Type: Buddhist Temple
- Archaeological Protected Monument of Sri Lanka
- Designated: 18 April 1947

Deeghawapi (Pali: Dīghavāpī, "long reservoir") is a Buddhist sacred shrine and an archaeological site in the Ampara District of Sri Lanka, historical records dating back to the 3rd century BCE. Water reservoirs, called "tanks", were an important feature of the hydraulic civilization of ancient Sri Lanka, and temples and cities were built around them. The importance of Dighavapi is connected with legends about visits to this site by the Buddha himself, and many allusions to Deeghawapi in the ancient chronicles as well as in the Pali literature. In more recent (medieval) times, the Sinhalese kings have settled Moor and Dutch settlers in the neighbouring areas. The construction is expected to be finished by the end 2023.

== Legend and Ancient History ==
The Mahavamsa, an ancient chronicle written in the 5th century, and the Dipavamsa of an earlier date, contain a mixture of legend and historical facts. These chronicles state that the Buddha himself visited the village, and on the spot where he sat in meditation a cetiya was later erected (Mhv. Ch.i.78). The Dipavamsa and the important Pali work, the Samantha Pasaadika. (Ch i. v.89) also have allusions to Dighavapi. The chronicles also state that some of the early inhabitants of the region were Yakkas, a group of people referred to even in the Ramayana, with genealogical links to the pre-Aryan 'Kirat' people of Northern India. While the likelihood of the Buddha having visited Dighavapi is remote, the attachment of such a legend to this site indicates the veneration given to it even in ancient times. In a pious legend connected with the Dighavapi cetiya (Dhajagga Paritta), it is said (in the Pali literary work Saararthapakaasani) that once a samanera (a novice monk), helping to plaster the Dighavapi cetiya, fell from the top. His colleagues shouted to him to recall the Dhajagga Pirita. He did so, and was miraculously saved.

There are many ancient inscriptions in the area. In 1986 a gold leaf inscription 14 cm by 1.5 cm had been unearthed. The inscription had been deposited inside a reliquary made of thick gold sheets. The text of the inscription was as follows: "Hail. The stupa (reliquary) of King Mahitisa (Kannittha Tissa) son of King Naka ... etc.". King Kannittha Tissa reigned from 164 to 192 CE. Other sites in this area have been discussed recently by the archeological researches of several workers including E. Medhananda

More detailed historical and lithographic records are available for the history of this region as a part of the Ruhuna kingdom, during the time of King Kavan-Tissa, the father of Dutugemunu. In fact, in the 3rd century before CE, the area was known as the district of "Dighamandala", or Digaamadulla" in Sinhala. Dutugamunu's brother, Tissa, governed it by the order of his father. Later, on the death of his father, he retired to Dighavapi with his mother and the elephant Kandula (Mhv.xxiv.2, 14f, 48). When he made peace with his brother, he was again sent there to look after the district and the Dighavapi region. After the re-conquest of the Pihiti rata (approximately today's Northern province), Tissa was again in charge of Dighavapi, for we find him being sent for from there at the time of Dutugamunu's death (Mhv.xxxii.2)). Tissa (afterwards called Saddhatissa) founded the main Dighavapi-vihara, in connection with which he built a cetiya, to which he made valuable offerings (Mhv.xxxiii.9, 14)). There are further historical allusion to Dighavapi in connection with the campaigns of king Parakramabahu I, in the 12th century (Chv.lxxiv.89; 98, 110, 180; lxxv.1, 10)).

== Medieval Times, Dutch and Muslim Settlers ==
The Dighavapi Vihara and Chetiya continued to receive Royal patronage and many pilgrims even in the worst of times. In 1638 CE King Rajasinghe II granted the area around Dighavapi and up to the coast to the Dutch. This was on the understanding that the Dutch would dislodge the Portuguese who were controlling the coastal regions of Sri Lanka. The Dutch East India Company (VOC) also got trading rights for cinnamon and other commercial products. By 1640 CE the Dutch won over Trincomalee (Gokanna) and Batticaloa (Madakalapuva) from the Portuguese but subsequently refused to hand over the littoral to Sinhala Rule, claiming compensation for military expenses. Descendants of the Dutch settlers of the region still live in the area and form the core of the Batticaloa burghers.

Another influx of people into the area occurred in 1736. The Muslims of the Batticaloa (Madakalapuva) area are descendants of Arab refugees settled in the Ampara district (i.e., area around Dighavapi) by King Senerat 1n 1726. They had been expelled by the Portuguese from the south-west Maritimes (de Queroz).

== Stupa restoration ==
In 2021, former President Gotabaya Rajapaksa initiated the ‘Deeghawapi Trust Fund’ which aims to rebuild the stupa and reconstruct the ancient premises. As of July 2021, construction is undergoing and with the help of the Sri Lankan Army have reached up to a height of 10 feet of the Stupa. The construction is expected to be finished by the end 2023.

== See also ==
- Solosmasthana
