= Nainativu =

Nainativu நயினாதீவு නාගදීපය
- Island
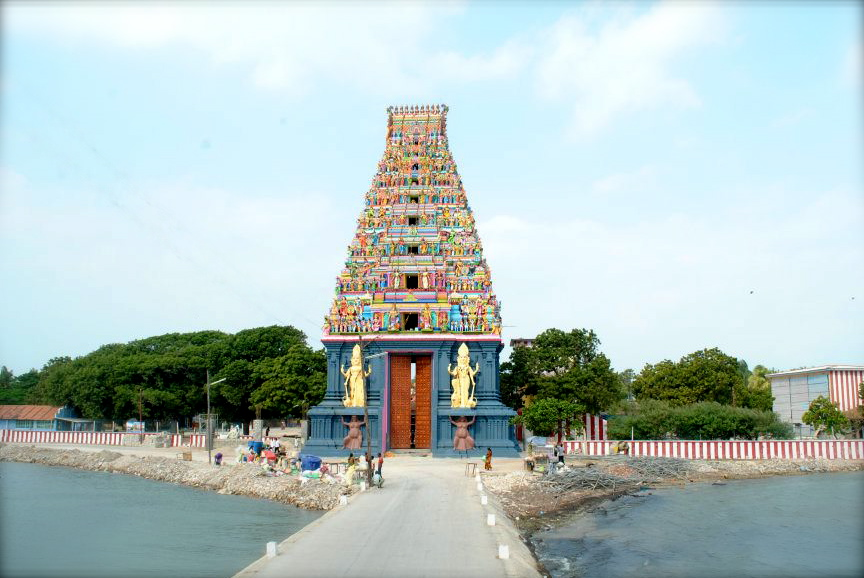
- Nagapooshani Amman Kovil

- Location within Northern Province
- Coordinates: 9°36′0″N 79°46′0″E
- Country: Sri Lanka
- Province: Northern
- District: Jaffna
- DS Division: Island South

Nainativu (Tamil: நயினாதீவு Nainatheevu, Sinhala: නාගදීපය Nagadeepa) is a small but notable island off the coast of the Jaffna Peninsula in the Northern Province, Sri Lanka. The name of the island alludes to the folklore inhabitants, the Naga people. It is home to the Hindu Nagapooshani Amman Temple, one of the prominent 64 Shakta pithas, and the Buddhist shrine Nagadeepa Purana Viharaya.

Historians note the island is mentioned in the ancient Tamil Sangam literature of nearby Tamil Nadu such as Manimekalai where it was mentioned as Manipallavam (Tamil: மணிபல்லவம்), and ancient Buddhist legends of Sri Lanka such as Mahavamsa. Ptolemy, a Greek cartographer, described the islands around the Jaffna Peninsula Nagadiba (Greek: Ναγάδιβα) in the first century CE.

== History ==
Early maps of Nainativu

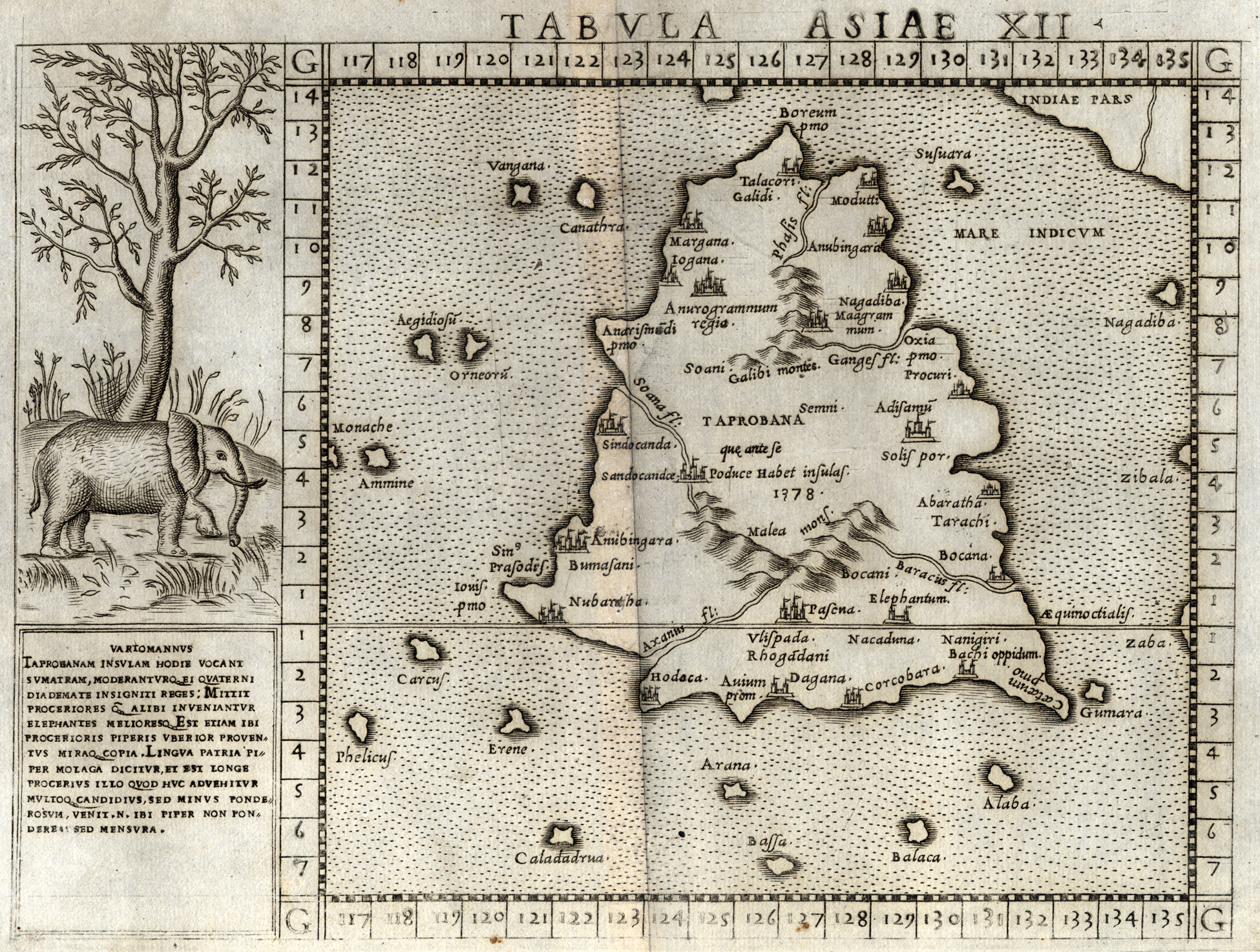
Ptolemy's map of Taprobana of 140 CE in a 1562 Ruscelli publication. The islet is called Nagadiba while the Jaffna Peninsula is called Nagadiba Maagramum.

Nāka Tivu / Nāka Nadu was the name of the whole Jaffna Peninsula in some historical documents. There are number of Buddhist myths associated with the interactions of people of this historical place with Buddha. The two Tamil epics of the second century - Kundalakesi and Manimekalai - describe the islet of Manipallavam of Nāka Nadu, this islet of the Jaffna peninsula, from where merchants came to obtain gems and conch shells. The protagonists of the former story by Nathakuthanaar, visited the island. In the latter poem by Sīthalai Sāttanār, the sea goddess Manimekhala brings the heroine to the island, where she worships Buddha. She is also told of the petrosomatoglyph atop the mountain of the main island and a magic bowl Amudha Surabhi (cornucopia bowl) that appears once every year in a lake of the islet.

The Manimekhalai and the Mahavamsa both describe Buddha settling a dispute between two Naga princes over a gem set throne seat on an island known as Manipallavam or Nagadeepa, identified as Nainativu by several scholars. The Tamil language inscription of the Nainativu Hindu temple by Parâkramabâhu I of the 12th century CE states that foreigners landing at new ports must meet at Kayts and they must be protected, and if ships to the islet carrying elephants and horses get shipwrecked, a fourth of the cargo must go to the treasury.

The epic Manimekalai tells the story of the Chola king Killi who on a visit to the island fell in love with the naga princess Pilivalai, the daughter of king Valaivanan of Manipallavam. The prince born out of this union was Tondaiman Ilamtiraiyan. When the boy grew up the princess wanted to send her son to the Chola kingdom. So she entrusted the prince to a merchant who dealt in woolen blankets called Kambala Chetty when the latter's ship stopped in the island. During the voyage to the Chola kingdom, the ship was wrecked due to rough weather and the boy was lost. He was later found washed ashore with a Tondai twig (creeper) around his leg. So he came to be called Tondaiman Ilam Tiraiyan meaning the young one of the seas or waves. When he grew up the northern part of the Chola kingdom was entrusted to him and the area he governed came to be called Tondaimandalam after him. He is considered by some scholars to be the progenitor of the Pallava dynasty and the dynasty he founded took its name after the native place of his mother, that is Manipallavam.

== Naga people ==
Naga people were snake-worshippers, a Dravidian custom, and spoke Tamil based on Ptolemy's description of the Naga people. They also likely spoke Prakrit, a language of the school of Amaravathi village, Guntur district with which the early Tamils of Jaffna had strong cultural relations during the classical period. The Nākas were a branch of the Dravidian community, and were at that time part of the Chera kingdom, and of ancient Tamilakam. Archaeological excavations and studies provide evidence of Palaeolithic inhabitation in the Tamil dominated Northern and Eastern Sri Lanka and in Tamil Naadu and Chera Naadu (Kerala region). The findings include Nāka idols and suggest that serpent worship was widely practised in the Dravidian regions of India and Sri Lanka during the megalithic period.

The Nākas lived among the Yakkha, Raksha and Deva in Ceylon according to the Manimekalai and Mahavamsa. Cobra worship, Tamil speech and Keralan cuisine extant in Jaffna Tamil culture from the classical period attests to the Nāka's heritage.

Sangam literature details how the ancient Tamil people were divided into five clans (Kudi) based on their profession during the Sangam period, where the Nāka clan, who were in charge of border security guarding the city wall and distant fortresses, inhabited the Coromandel Coast - South Tamil Nadu, East Tamil Nadu and North Sri Lanka. The name Nāka was either a corrupted version of the word Nayinaar or may have been applied to this community due to their head covering being the shape of a hydra-headed cobra in reverence to their serpentine deities. Ancient Tamil epic Manimekalai and the Sri Lankan history book Mahavamsa both mention a dispute between two Naga kings in northern Sri Lanka. Some scholars derives the origin of the Pallava dynasty of Tamilakam from an marriage alliance of the Cholas and the Naga from Jaffna Peninsula. This incident is mentioned in the Tamil epic, Manimekalai.

=== Decline of Naga identity and assimilation ===
The Naga people, also known as Nayanair, assimilated the Tamil language and culture, forming one of descendants of the Sri Lankan Tamils. They continue to worship their patron Nayinaar deity (a five headed cobra) and Nagapooshani Amman even today within the sanctum sanctorum of the Nainativu Nagapooshani Amman Temple.

== Demography ==
The population of the island is approximately 2,500 Sri Lankan Tamils and about 150 Muslims. Many Tamils of Nainativu origin, live overseas as part of the Sri Lankan Tamil diaspora.

== See also ==
- Adam's Peak
- Kataragama temple
- Munneswaram temple
- Nallur (Jaffna)
