= Nagadeepa Purana Vihara =

Temple in Sri Lanka

Nagadipa Purana Vihara
- නාගදීප පුරාණ විහාරය நயினாதீவு நாக விகாரை
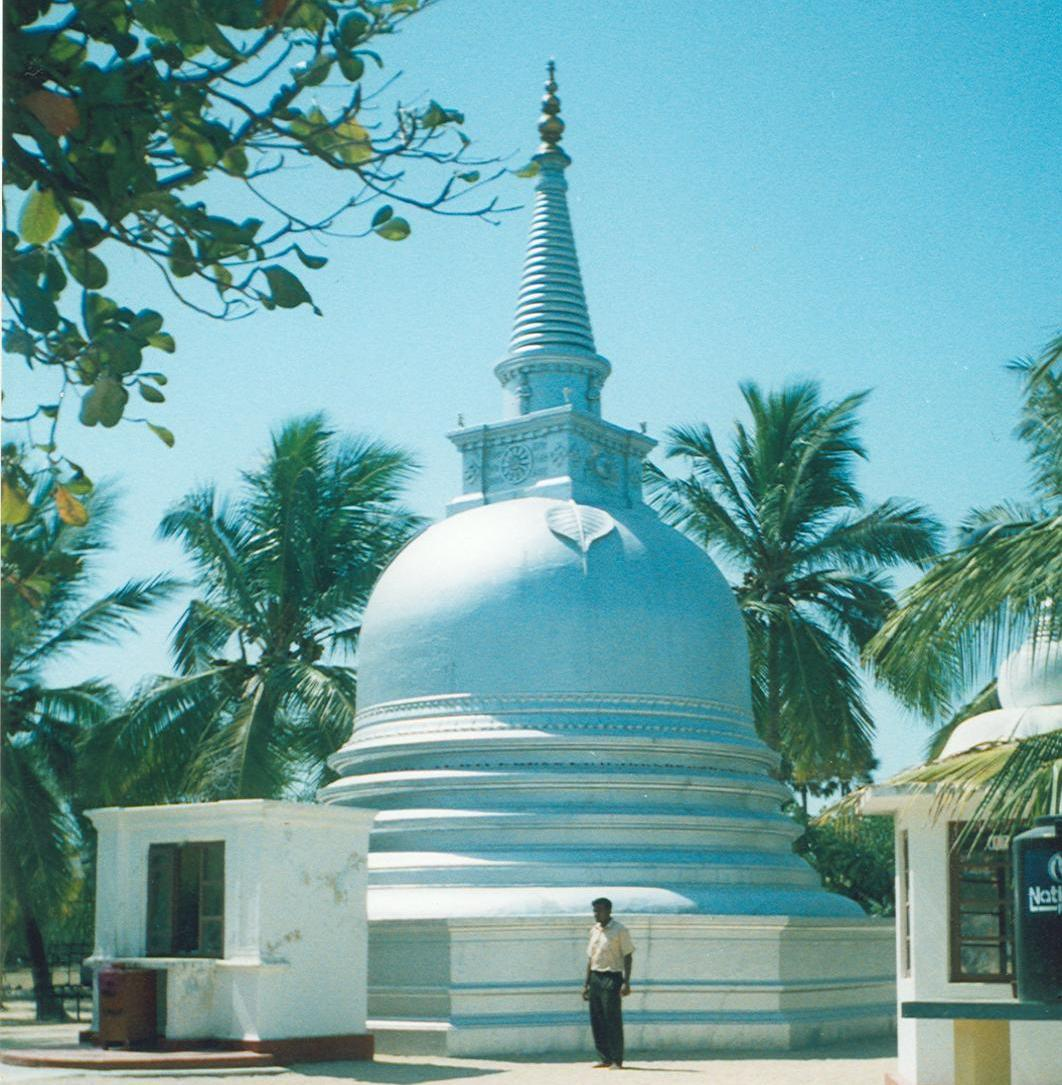
- The Nagadipa Purana Viharaya, one of the 16 Solosmasthana

Religion
- Affiliation: Buddhism
- District: Jaffna
- Province: Northern Province

Location
- Location: Nainativu, Sri Lanka
- Interactive map of Nagadipa Purana Vihara
- Coordinates: 09°36′45.9″N 79°46′26.3″E

Architecture
- Type: Buddhist temple
- Archaeological Protected Monument of Sri Lanka
- Official name: Rock Inscription Of Nagadipa Vihara
- Designated: 23.02.2007

Website
- nagadeepaviharaya

Nagadipa Purana Vihara (Sinhala: නාගදීප පුරාණ විහාරය, Tamil: நயினாதீவு நாக விகாரை) is an ancient Buddhist temple situated in Jaffna district of Northern Province, Sri Lanka. It is among the country's sixteen holiest Buddhist shrines (Solosmasthana). According to contemporary history, the Gautama Buddha visited the site after five years of attaining Enlightenment to settle the dispute between two warring Naga kings, Chulodara and Mahodara.

Ancient history according to the Mahavamsa chronicles and the Tamil Buddhist epic Manimekalai mentions a gem-studded throne and a stone with the Buddha's footprint at the island Nainativu, (also known as Nagadipa) which pilgrims from India visited.

== History and development ==
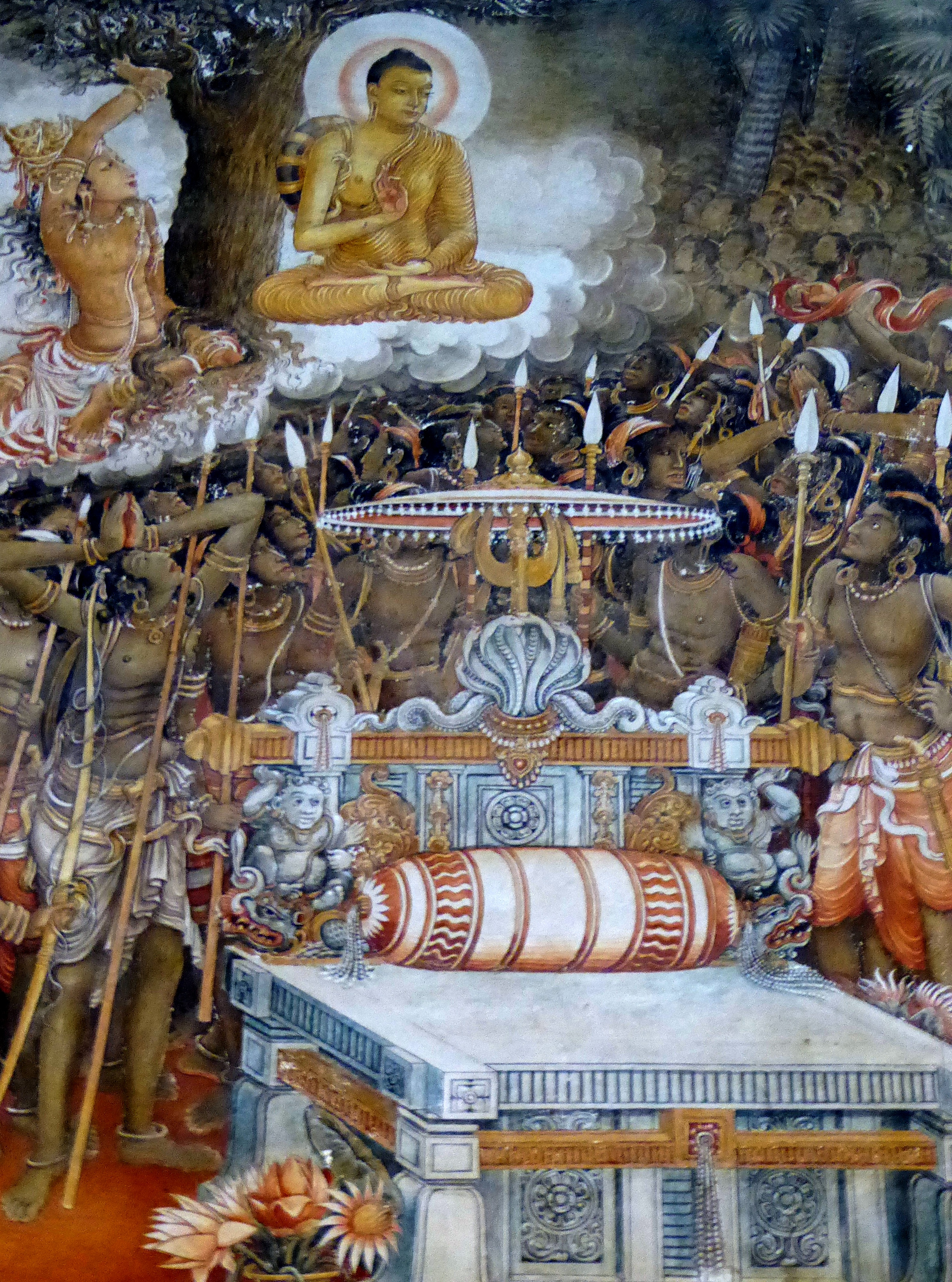
Buddha's visit to Nagadipa. Detail from Kelaniya Raja Maha Vihara

The site is known as the place where Lord Buddha came during his second visit to Sri Lanka, after five years of attaining Enlightenment, to intervene and mediate in settling a dispute between two Naga Kings, Chulodara and Mahodara over the possession of a gem-studded throne.

When Buddha arrived and saw the Naga Kings prepared for fighting, Budhha used psychic powers to appear in the sky performing miracles. This made the Nagas astonished and happy. After having listened to the Dhamma sermons displaying Buddha's masterly knowledge of unity and harmony, meththa and compassion, the Naga kings paid homage to Budhha with overwhelming faith. The throne was offered to him in unison and they became pious devotees.

A deity named Samiddhi Sumana, who had made the banyan tree his abode, accompanied him to Tathagatha while in Jetavanarama, holding the uprooted tree (Rajayathana tree) as an umbrella (parasol) to him. The Naga King Maniakkitha, ruler of Kelaniya, moved by the compassion of the Buddha, thanked him profusely for settling the dispute. He further pleaded for a souvenir to worship and consequently the Buddha offered him the Rajayathana tree and the throne.

The Nagadipa Vihara has been reconstructed, and developed in the times of king Devanampiya Tissa and Dutugemunu and to convert it into a sacred place.

=== Modern History ===
The temple was affected by ethnic strife and the civil war and was targeted several times. During the 1958 riots Tamil mobs that came from boats destroyed parts of the temple including a gold plated Buddha statue gifted from Burma which was beheaded and its arms removed and thrown to the sea and stupa which was blown up using dynamite. The government censored the incident at the orders of Governor-General Sir Oliver Goonetilleke who feared that the news would lead to further violence and restored the temple in secrets and the then head priest Rajak’ya Pandita Brahmanawatte Dhammakithi Tissa Mahanayaka Thera cooperated considering it an 'exercise of deception' in the interest of humanity. In 1986 the LTTE attacked a boat bringing food to the temple by placing bombs and blowing up the jetty. The explosion was set off prematurely due to a navy patrol and the enraged naval personnel nearly went on a shooting spree that was averted by Dhammakithi Thera who accosted them and calmed the soldiers who then returned to their barracks. Due to frequent threats the temple was given military protection and a bunker was built for senior monks during attacks and junior monks were given self-defence lessons by the navy.

During the 1990 Expulsion of Muslims by the LTTE Muslims took refuge in the temple and Dhammakithi Thera claimed that no Muslim will be sent away and assured protection from the navy resulting in the Muslim population in Nainativu being the only group to avoid the expulsion. This eventually led to the tradition where the first Iftar is served to the Muslim by the Navy within the temple. In 2003 Dhammakithi Thera died name=":0" />

Since the end of the war in 2009 the temple has rapidly grown to accommodate a massive number of pilgrims. By 2010 the total pilgrims visiting the Temple combined with those of the Hindu Nallur Kovil in Jaffna, and the Catholic Madhu Marian shrine in Mannar was nearly 3 million. In 2011 a gem-studded throne plated with gold and silver was donated by businessmen in Ratnapura to represent the throne in the legend that caused the war between Chulodara and Mahodara.

== See also ==
- List of Archaeological Protected Monuments in Sri Lanka
- Ancient constructions of Sri Lanka
- Buddhism amongst Tamils
