= Naga people (Lanka) =

Ancient tribe of Sri Lanka

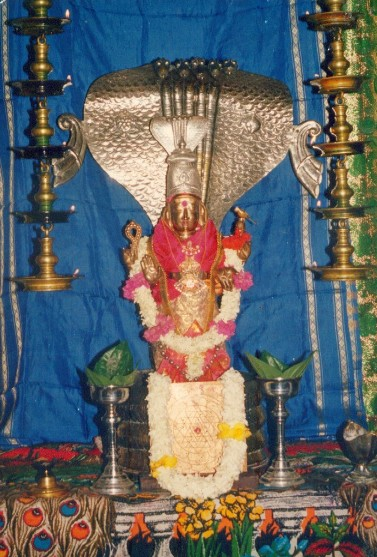
Cobra symbolism in a Sri Lankan Hindu statue of the Nainativu Nagapooshani Amman Temple

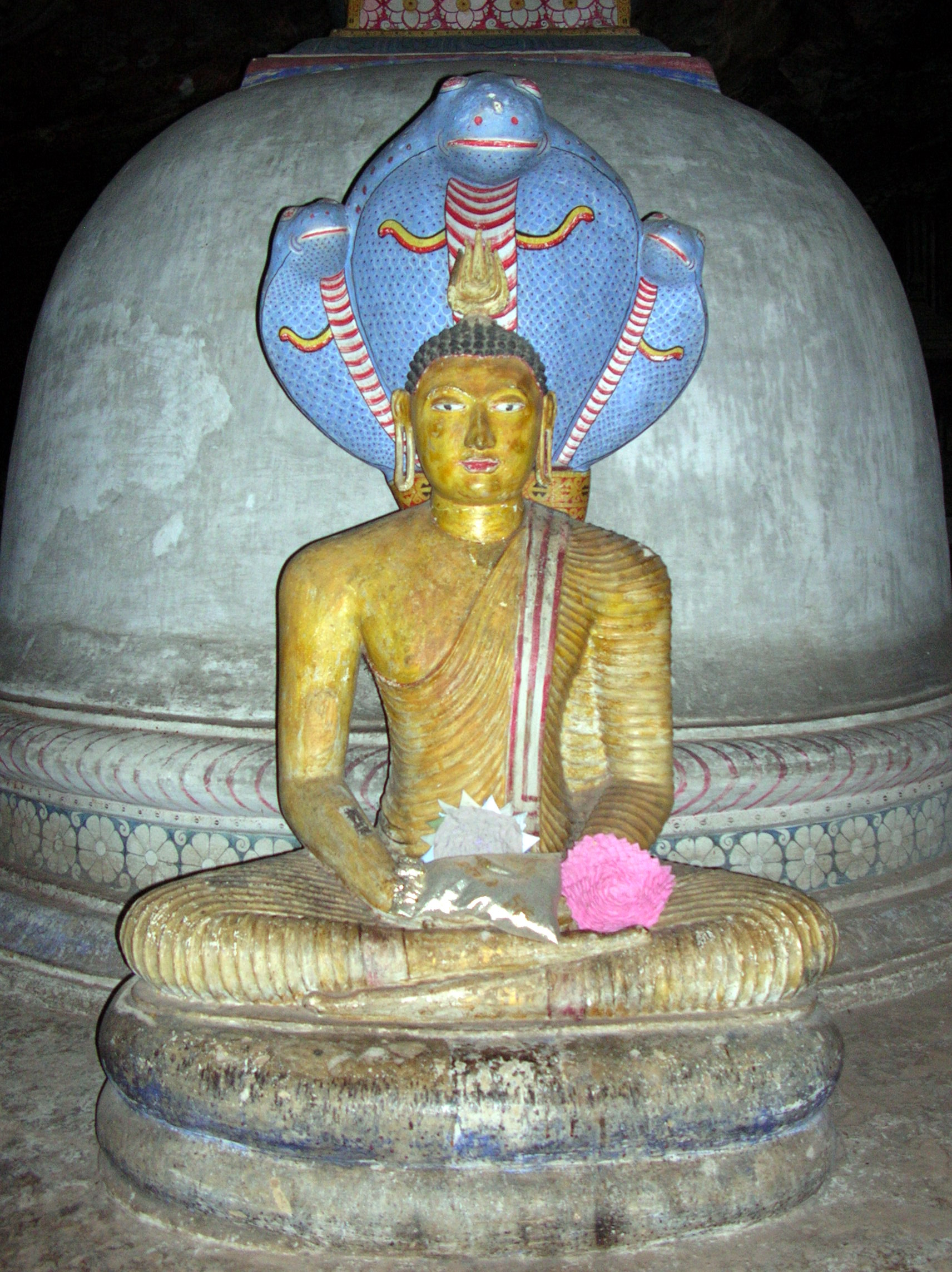
According to Buddhist scripture the Naga king Muchalinda shielded the Buddha from getting wet in the rain by coiling round him and holding his large hood above the Buddha's head.

The Naga people are believed by some to be an ancient mythological people who once inhabited Sri Lanka and various parts of Southern India. There are references to Nagas in several ancient texts such as Mahavamsa, Manimekala. They were generally represented as a class of super-humans taking the form of serpents who inhabit a subterranean world. (Note: In the Mahavamsa as indeed in the ancient Sanskrit and Pali literature in general, the Nagas are never represented as human beings, but as a class of superhuman beings, who inhabited a subterranean world.)

Certain places such as Nagadeepa in Jaffna and Kalyani in Gampaha are mentioned as their abodes. The names of some Naga kings in Sri Lankan Ancient legend and the cult of Naga prevailed in India up to medieval times.

The Jaffna Peninsula was mentioned in Tamil literature as Naka Nadu, in Pali literature as Nagadeepa and in Greek gazetteer as Nagadiba. The name Nagabhumi was also found on a Brahmi-inscribed coin from Uduthurai, Jaffna and in a Tamil inscription from Pudukkottai, Tamil Nadu referring to the Jaffna peninsula.

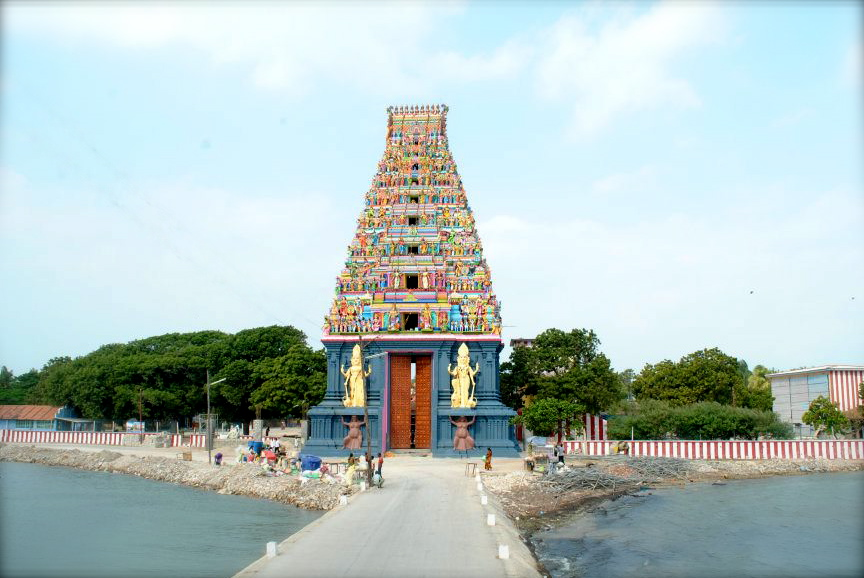
The Sacred Śakti Pītha, Nainathivu Nagapooshani Amman Temple. Dedicated to Nagapooshani. The local mother goddess of the snake-worshipping Nagas.

Sri Lankan Tamils largely believe that the Nāgas were their ancient predecessors and among the earliest inhabitants of the island. They flourished, especially in the northern and eastern regions long before the emergence of modern ethnic identities. Their legacy survives in Tamil place names, serpent traditions, temple worship, ancient Tamil literature, and a shared Proto-Dravidian Megalithic Urn burial culture. Overtime, these indigenous Nāga communities are believed to have merged with the wider Tamil civilization, contributing to the ancestry and cultural identity of Sri Lankan Tamils.

Sri Lankan Tamils remain one of the clearest communities on the island in which ophiolatry, or snake/serpent worship, survives as a living religious tradition. Nāga worship continues particularly through Tamil Hindu practices surrounding Nāga deities, sacred serpent stones, fertility, ancestral protection, and shrines associated with snakes. Most strikingly, naturally formed earth, anthill, and termite mounds associated with serpents may themselves be worshipped as living sacred spaces, rather than simply as representations of a deity. Offerings and prayers made directly at these mounds preserve a particularly ancient relationship between Nāga, land, and sacred space. These traditions maintain a striking connection to the ancient Nāga religious landscape of Sri Lanka, especially in the north and east of the island.

Sinhalese traditions also preserve memories of ancient peoples associated with the island, and some modern interpretations connect the idea of Siv-Hela (“four Hela”) with four ancestral groups contributing to Sinhala ethnogenesis. However, explicitly Nāga-centred ritual practices are far less visible in mainstream modern Sinhalese culture than they are among Sri Lankan Tamils. While serpent imagery and Nāga figures certainly remain within Sinhala Buddhist folklore and religious art, the continuity of active serpent veneration as a community practice is much more readily observable within Sri Lankan Tamil Hindu traditions.

== Etymology ==
The word has many origins. In Tamil Nagarigam literally means "cultured-people." The word may have also come from naga, which literally means "snake" or "serpent" in Sanskrit, Tamil, Pali, Sinhala languages.

== Origin ==
According to Manogaran, some scholars also "have postulated that the Yakshas and Nagas [...] are the aboriginal tribes of Sri Lanka". Scholars like K. Indrapala regard them as an ancient tribe who started to assimilate to Tamil culture and language from the 3rd century BCE. (Note: Kathiragesu Indrapala writes that "In the traditions preserved in the early Sri Lankan chronicles as well as in the early Tamil literary works the Nagas appear as a distinct group". He further writes that "the adoption of the Tamil language was helping the Nagas in the Tamil chiefdoms to be assimilated into the major ethnic group there".) According to him, in the end of the 9th century or probably very long before that time, the Nagas assimilated into the two major ethnic groups of the island.

According to V. Kanakasabhai, The Oliyar, Parathavar, Maravar, Paraiyar, Kallar, Palli and Eyinar who were widespread across South India and North-East Sri Lanka are all Naga tribes. According to several authors they may have been a Tamil tribe. Many Tamil poets who contributed to the Sangam literature attached Naga prefixes and suffixes to their names to indicate their Naga descent.

== Early references ==
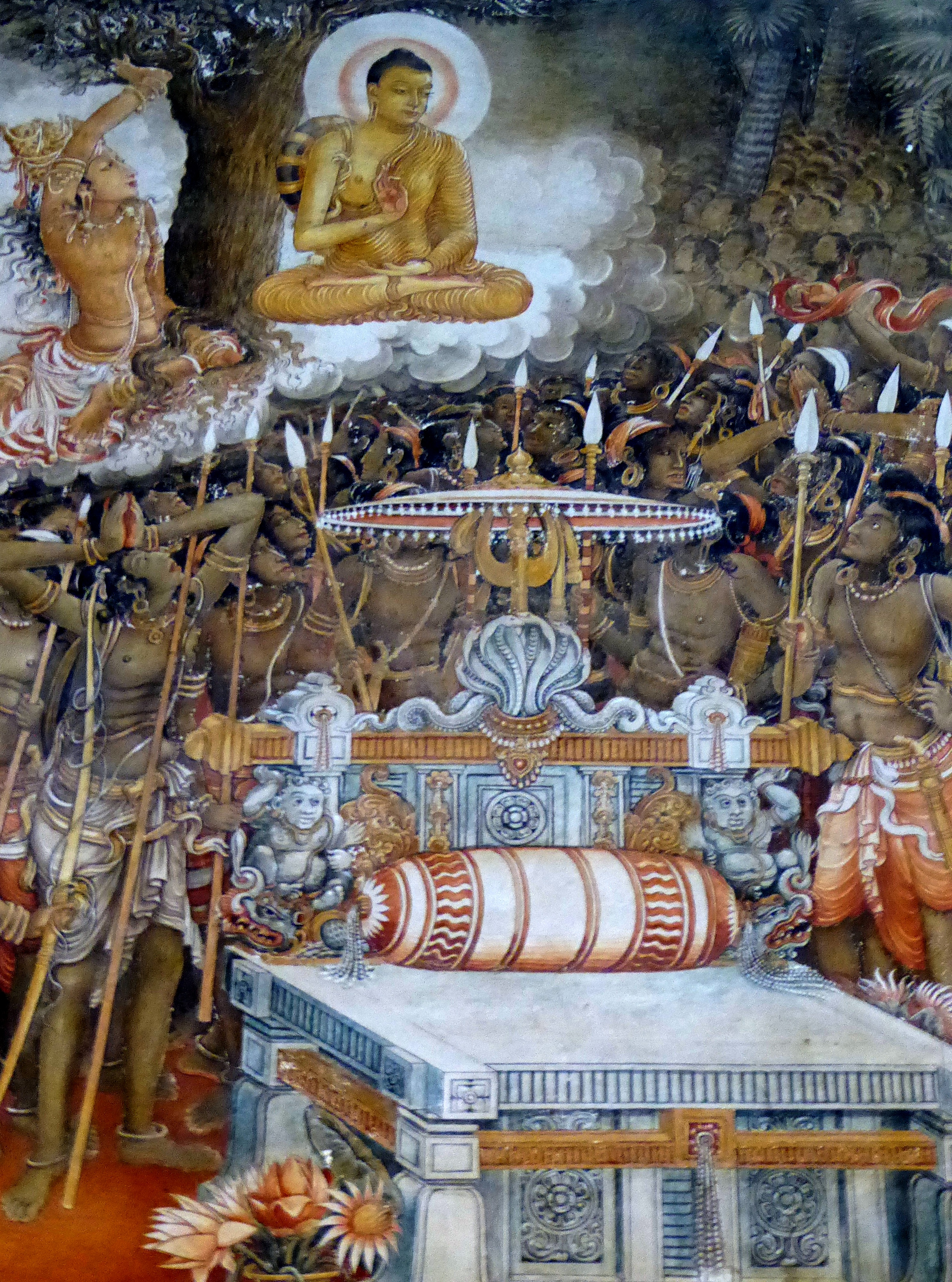
Buddha's visit to Nagadeepa. Detail from Kelaniya Raja Maha Vihara

=== Mahavamsa ===
The chronicle states that the Buddha, during his second visit to the island, pacified a dispute between two Naga Kings of Nagadeepa, Chulodara and Mahodara over the possession of a gem-studded throne. This throne was finally offered to the Buddha by the grateful Naga kings who left it in Nagadeepa under a Rajayathana tree (Kiri Palu) as an object of worship. Since then the place became one of the holiest shrines of Buddhists in the island for many centuries. The references to Nagadeepa in Mahawamsa as well as other Pali writings, coupled with archaeological and epigraphical evidences, have established that Nagadeepa of the Mahawamsa is the present Jaffna Peninsula.

The chronicle further states that in the eighth year after the Enlightenment, the Buddha visited the island for the third time, on an invitation of Maniakkhita, the Naga king of Kalyani (Modern day Kelaniya) who is the uncle of the Naga king of Nagadeepa.

=== Manimekalai ===
In the Tamil epic Manimekalai, the heroine is miraculously transported to a small island called Manipallavam where there was a seat or foot stool associated to the Buddha. The seat in Manipallavam is said to have been used by the Buddha when he preached and reconciled the two kings of Naga land, and that it was placed in Manipallavam by the king of gods, Indra. (Note: Manimekalai, V. Saminatha Aiyar, Cantos X-XII, Madras (1921)) The legend speaks of the great Naga king Valai Vanan and his queen Vasamayilai who ruled over Manipallavam in the Jaffna Peninsula. Their daughter, the princess Pilli Valai had a liaison at the islet with the early Chola king Killivalavan; out of this union was the prince Tondai Eelam Thiraiyar born, who historians note was the early progenitor of the Pallava Dynasty. He went on to rule Tondai Nadu from Kanchipuram. Nainativu was referred to as Manipallavam in ancient Tamil literature following this union. Royals of the Chola-Naga lineage would go on to rule other territory of the island, Nagapattinam and Tondai Nadu of Tamilakam.

By the time Buddhism had reached Tamilakam, the twin epics of ancient Tamil Nadu Silappatikaram (5–6th century CE) and Manimekalai (6th century CE) were written, speaking of Naga Nadu across the sea from Kaveripoompuharpattinam. The island according to the Tamil epic was divided into two territory, Naga Nadu and Ilankaitheevam. Naga Nadu, or the whole island was also known as Cherantheevu, derived from Tamil words Cheran (meaning Naga) and theevu (meaning island).

==== Identifying Manipallavam ====
The similarity of the legend about the Buddha's seat given in the Mahavamsa to that in the Manimekalai has led certain scholars to identify the Manipallavam with Nagadeepa (currently Nainativu), which has caused the history to be extracted out of the legend. (Note: The similarity of the legend of the holy seat given in the Mahawamsa to that in the Manimekalai has led certain scholars to identify Manipallavam with Nagadeepa, and as the former refers to the two kings as having their habitat in the Nagadeepa, the Nakanatu (the Naga land), wherever it is mentioned, has been taken as referring to the Jaffna peninsula. Continuing this method of extracting history out of the legend, a Naga damsel who is said in the Manimekalai to have appeared in a garden near Pukar, remained for sometime with a legendary Cola king and disappeared after conceiving a child, is taken to have been a princess form Jaffna and father an ancient ruler of Jaffna)

Cīttalai Cāttanār, the author of the Manimekalai, reflected the perception at the time that Naga Nadu was an autonomous administrative entity, kingdom or nadu stretching across coastal districts, distinguished from the rest of the island also ruled intermittently by Naga kings.

The Naga king Valai Vanan was stated in the Manimekalai to be the king of Naga Nadu, one of the two territories in Sri Lanka, the other being Ilankaitheevam. Several scholars identify Naga Nadu with the Jaffna Peninsula, and Manipallavam with Nainativu. Other scholars identify Karaitivu as Manipallavam.

Senarath Paranavithana rejects the identification of Manipallavam with Nainativu and the Jaffna Peninsula, because Manimekalai states the island to have been uninhabited, whereas the Jaffna Peninsula have been inhabited centuries before the date of the epic. (Note: Anku valvor yavarum inmaiyin, Canto XIV, I.86) He also notes that Manimekalai does not mention that the two Naga kings had their abode in Manipallavam as stated in the Mahavamsa, nor did it mention that the holy seat was placed there by Gautama Buddha, but by Indra. (Note: Tevar-kon itta mamanippilikai, Canto VIII, I.52) Further states Canto IX, II. 13–22 that an earthquake destroyed a city in Gandhara which in turn affteced 100 yojanas of Naga Nadu, thus rejecting the identification of Naga Nadu with Jaffna Peninsula.

=== Ramayana ===
In the Indian epic Ramayana, the mythological island Lanka has been often identified with Sri Lanka. The inhabitants of Lanka were mentioned as non-humans, mainly referring to the Rakshasas and Yakshas, but also mentioning the Nagas. Indrajit, the son of Ravana was married to Sulochana, a Naga princess.

=== Others ===
Ptolemy in his 1st century map of Taprobane mentions Nagadibois. Ptolemy mentions in 150 CE that King Sornagos, a descendant of this lineage, ruled from the early Chola capital of Uraiyur during this time.

== Culture ==
=== Irrigation ===
It is also believed they were great irrigation engineers who built water storages. The Giant's Tank dam and reservoir system in Mannar, Sri Lanka is considered by some (such as Author, Mudaliyar C. Rajanayagam) to have been built by the Nagas based on the extensive ruins and the presence of villages with surrounding the port with Naga name (e.g. Nagarkulam, Nagathazhvu and Sirunagarkulam).

=== Snake worship ===
Sri Lankan Tamil Hindus since ancient times have regarded the cobra as a divine being by the passing down of Naga traditions and beliefs. Further, a cobra can be found entwining itself round the neck of the Hindu god Shiva as the serpent-king Vasuki. Cobras can also be found in images of god Vishnu. However it is noted that Sri Lankan Tamil worship indigenous snake gods unique to the island, such as the worship of Nagathampiran the most popular mainstream naga god in Sri Lanka and its diaspora population and represent the chief of the nagas, thampuran meaning chief in old Tamil sometimes affiliated with shiva himself. The worship of nagathampurani is female embodiment of the nagas, whose worship is prominent in trincomalee and batticaloa districts. The worship nambran is existent mainly in the eastern Vanni regions with many rural naga shrines titling nambran as the naga god. The goddess nagambikkai is also a female embodiment of the naga god popular in the kilinochchi and rural jaffna provinces.

=== Religion ===
There is substantial evidence to say that Nagas were Buddhist followers after the 4th century B.C. One such example is Buddha's second visit Sri Lanka mentioned in both the Manimekalai and Mahavamsa.

== See also ==
- Ancient clans of Lanka
