= Mahiyangana =

Mahiyanganaya මහියංගණය
- Town
- Location within Sri Lanka
- Coordinates: 7°19′00″N 80°58′58″E
- Country: Sri Lanka
- Province: Uva Province
- District: Badulla

Government
  - Type: Local Government (ප්‍රාදේශිය සභාව)
- Time zone: UTC+5:30 (Sri Lanka Standard Time Zone)
- Postal Code: 90700
- Area code: 055

Mahiyanganaya is a town situated close to the Mahaweli River in Badulla District, Uva Province of Sri Lanka. It is said that Gautama Buddha visited Mahiyanganaya on the Duruthu full moon poya day in order to settle a dispute arose between Yakkas and Nagas (two tribes which then inhabited the area) and this was his first ever visit to Sri Lanka. Then the Buddha preached Dhamma to Sumana Saman, a leader in this area, to whom the Buddha gave a handful of his hair relic so that people could worship. After that Sumana Saman (now the god Sumana Saman) built a golden chethiya in which the sacred hair relic was deposited. Later on about seven chethiyas were built over the original golden chethiya from time to time, the last one being built by the King Dutugemunu. As such, this historic town is a very sacred place for Buddhists.

Mahiyanganaya is a Sinhala Buddhist stronghold in Sri Lanka.Religious composition in Mahiyanganaya DS Division according to 2012 census is Buddhists 73,410-96.89%,Islam 1,876-2.48%,Other Christians 230-0.30%,Roman Catholics 143-0.19%,Hindus 81-0.11%,Others 36-0.05%.

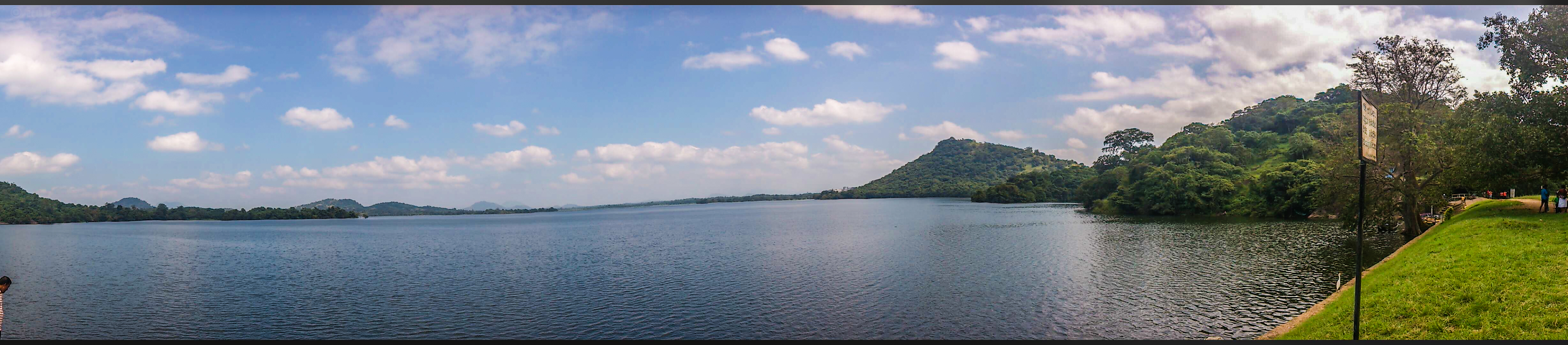
a panoramic view of Sorabora Wewa

The majority of the people in this area are engaged in paddy cultivation being the main economic activity.

== The name ==
Mahiyangana is a Pali word (in Sinhalese Bintenna) which means flat land. It is situated eastwards to the steep eastern falls of central hills. The relative flatness of the area can be seen while traveling on the road from Kandy to Padiyathalawa across Hunnasgiriya and famous 18 hairpin bends.

== Transport ==
The nearest railway station is Badulla. Mahiyangana is connected to cities and towns like Kandy, Badulla, Polonnaruwa, Ampara and Monaragala by main roads.

== Gallery ==
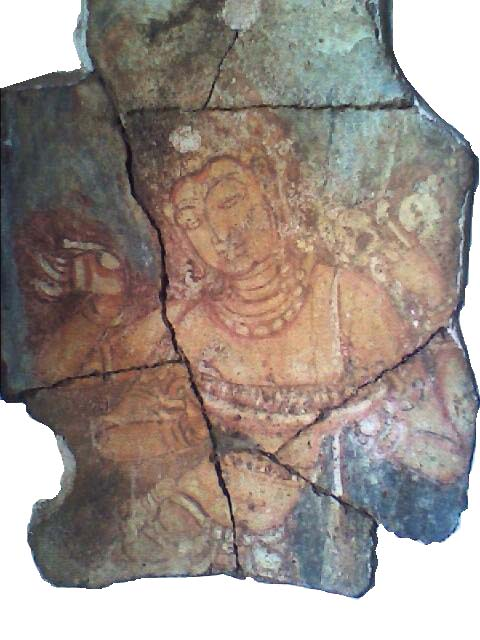
Vishnu bearing a tray of flowers. A painting of the relic chamber of Mahiyangana Stupa (9-11 centuries AD). Currently displayed at Archaeological Museum of Anuradhapura.

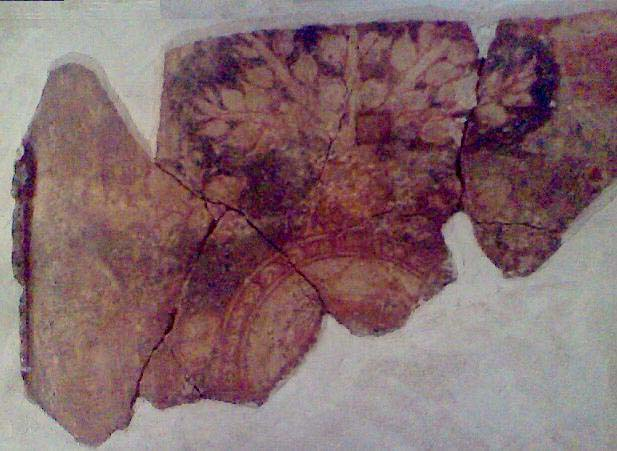
The Buddha seated under the Bodhi tree after the enlightenment. A fragmentary relic chamber painting from Mahiyangana Stupa. (9-11 centuries AD) Currently displayed at Archaeological Museum of Anuradhapura.

== See also ==
- Mahiyangana Raja Maha Vihara
- Transport in Sri Lanka
- Bibile
