= Sumana Saman =

Buddhist god from Sri Lanka

- Other names: Saman
- Sinhalese: සුමන සමන් දෙවි
- Mount: Elephant

Saman (also called Sumana, Sumana Saman, Sinhala: සුමන සමන් දෙවි) is a deity, subject to local and indigenous belief and worship in Sri Lanka. The name Saman means "good minded". His character is of historical significance for the Sinhalese people and veneration especially to all the Buddhists. Maha Sumana Saman Deviraja (Greater Lord of Gods Sumana Saman) is depicted crowned and bejeweled, holding a lotus flower in his right or left hand and accompanied by a white elephant.

According to Mahavamsa, the early chronicle of Sri Lanka, Saman is considered one of the guardian deities of the island and Buddhism in the country. Natha, Upulvan, Vibhishana and Kataragama are the other guardian deities. Nayakkar dynasty from South India introduced the goddess Pattini replacing god Saman, during the period of Kandyan Kingdom. Saman is the guardian (patron deity) or the presiding deity of Sabaragamuwa and the Sri Pada mountain. Accordingly, his main shrine (devalaya) is at Ratnapura, where an annual festival is held in his honor. Another major shrine dedicated to god Saman is situated at Mahiyangana in Uva Province of Sri Lanka.

Saman is known as Samantabhadra Bodhisattva in East Asia under the names Pǔxián Púsà in Chinese, Fugen Bosatsu in Japanese, Bohyun Bosal in Korean, Kun-tu bzang-po in Tibetan and Phổ Hiền Bồ Tát in Vietnamese.

== History ==
According to common belief, Saman may have been a king or a provincial ruler (Maha Sumana) of Sabaragamuwa from the Dewa (people) of Sri Lanka, one of the four main clans in ancient Sri Lanka. According to the tradition of Sammuti Deva (considered a deity by common acceptance), he is revered as a deity. Following his death, Prince Sumana Saman became a god, by the name of God Maha Sumana Saman. He is also thought to have been born as a Dewa of the heavens following his death due to his great past merit, who also became the presiding deity of Sri Pada.

According to legendary history, Sumana Saman deviyo (god) invited Buddha to the Samanala Kanda and on request Gautama Buddha visited and left his foot print on the rock at the top of the mountain as a token of symbolic worship, in the absence of the Buddha. Saman was there when Buddha visited the island for the first time and became a stream-entrant (sotapanna) after listening to preaches by the Buddha, who also gave him a handful of hairs with which he erected the Stupa at Mahiyangana.

== Sri Pada ==
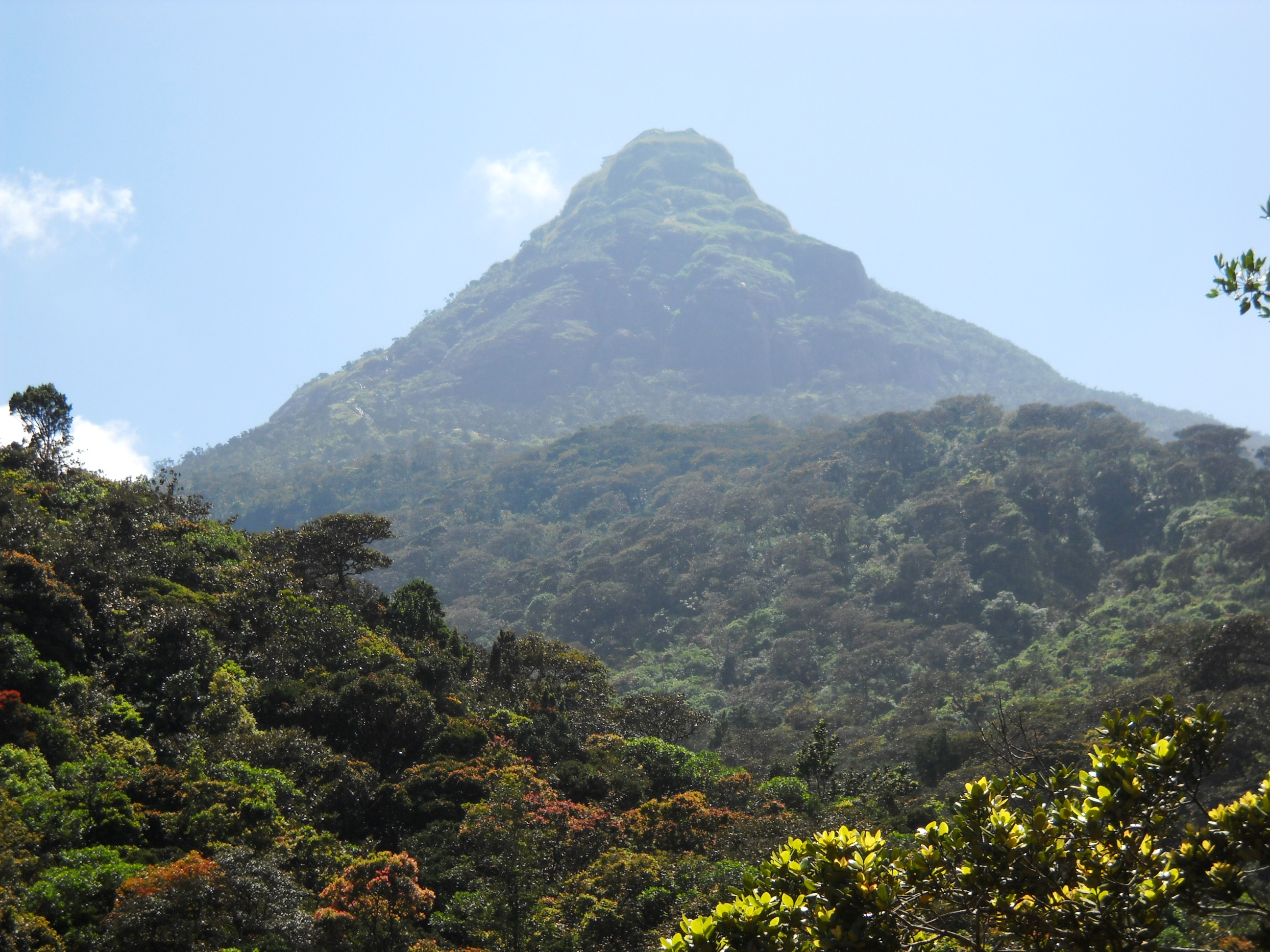
God Saman is the guardian deity of the Sri Pada mountain (Adam's Peak)

According to Mahavansa, the great chronicle of Sri Lanka, Sri Pada mountain (also called Sumanakuta, Samangira, Samantha Kuta and Samanala Kanda) bears the impression of the Buddha's left foot, which he left on his third visit to the island. Some say that the name Samantha Kuta means the "Peak of the God Saman". Generally Sri Lankan Buddhists believe that the footmark on the summit of Sri Pada is that of Buddha, who during his third visit to Kelaniya, 2580 years ago, kept the imprint of his left foot thereon as a relic worthy of veneration.

Buddhist devotees who climb the Peak regard God Sumana Saman as their benevolent protector. It is believed that the first person to discover the sacred footprint was King Walagamba (104–76 BC) while he was in exile in the mountain wilderness. According to the local legend he had been led to the summit of the mountain by a deity in the guise of a stag. Thereafter not only ordinary pilgrims but also royalty paid homage to the footprint of the Buddha from ancient times. The pilgrim season to the Sri Pada begins annually on the full moon poya day in December and ends on the Vesak poya day in May. During this six-month period, thousands of pilgrims ascend the mountain to venerate the sacred footmark on the summit.

== Beliefs ==
Greater Lord of Gods Sumana Saman is the tutelary deity of the mountain wilderness, whose divine eye is supposed to cast upon Deraniyagala, Ellakkala, Boltumbe, Nivithigala and the mountain Benasamanalagala. He is regarded as the chief deity of the area surrounding the sacred mountain as well as of the Sabaragamuwa country in general.

The Theravada Buddhists of Sri Lanka later made god Saman the guardian of their land and their religion. With the rise of Mahayana Buddhism, Saman was identified as Samantabhadra, one of the four principal bodhisattvas of Mahayana. Like Samantabhadra, Saman is usually depicted crowned and bejewelled, holding a lotus in his right hand and accompanied by a white elephant. At Weligama, an ancient port on Sri Lanka's south coast, there is a 3.7-metre-high (12-foot) statue which some believe is the figure of Samantabhadra carved out of a huge moss-covered bolder. This statue is now called Kushta Rajagala. It is thought that the Pilgrims from India and northern Sri Lanka disembarking at Weligama were greeted by this bodhisattva figure as they set out on the long trek to Sri Pada.

Sumana Saman is depicted in human form accompanied by a white elephant, the ancient bulldozer of Lanka, the great noble beast of royal and Buddhist significance, in the background of Sri Pada (Adam's Peak). The resplendent god, a divine being in every sense of the word, holds a red lotus (a flower of Sinhalese Buddhist significance) alongside his noble elephant.

== Impact on Sri Lankan culture ==
The dance tradition of Sabaragamuwa relates to the god Saman. The costume worn in the dance is said to resemble his clothes. People of Sabaragamuwa have much faith in the deity and many of their traditions relate to him. The dances are usually performed in Ratnapura, relating to the worshiping of Sumana Saman much revered by local people.

The Maha Saman Devalaya of Ratnapura, first built by King Parakramabahu II (Pandita Parakramabahu) in 1270 AD, is the main temple dedicated to the deity Saman. Every August this shrine conducts a traditional festival for two weeks every night. This ceremony may be the oldest precession in Sri Lanka, according to a poem sung in "Gara Yakuma" dance, relating to Rama Ravana Story and God Sumana Saman.

There is also a Saman Devalaya at Mahiyangana. In Sandesha literature, poems were written to Sumana Saman for his blessing on the country. Pilgrims who climb the Samanala Kanda expect blessings of the deity. They make sure not to anger him. The people living in the area tell many tales of his power and miracles.

== See also ==
- Samantabhadra, the Chinese, Japanese, Korean, Tibetan and Vietnamese counterpart of Saman
- Culture of Sri Lanka
- History of Sri Lanka
- Sri Pada
- Sabaragamuwa
