= Adam's Peak =

Mountain in Sri Lanka

- Sri Pada
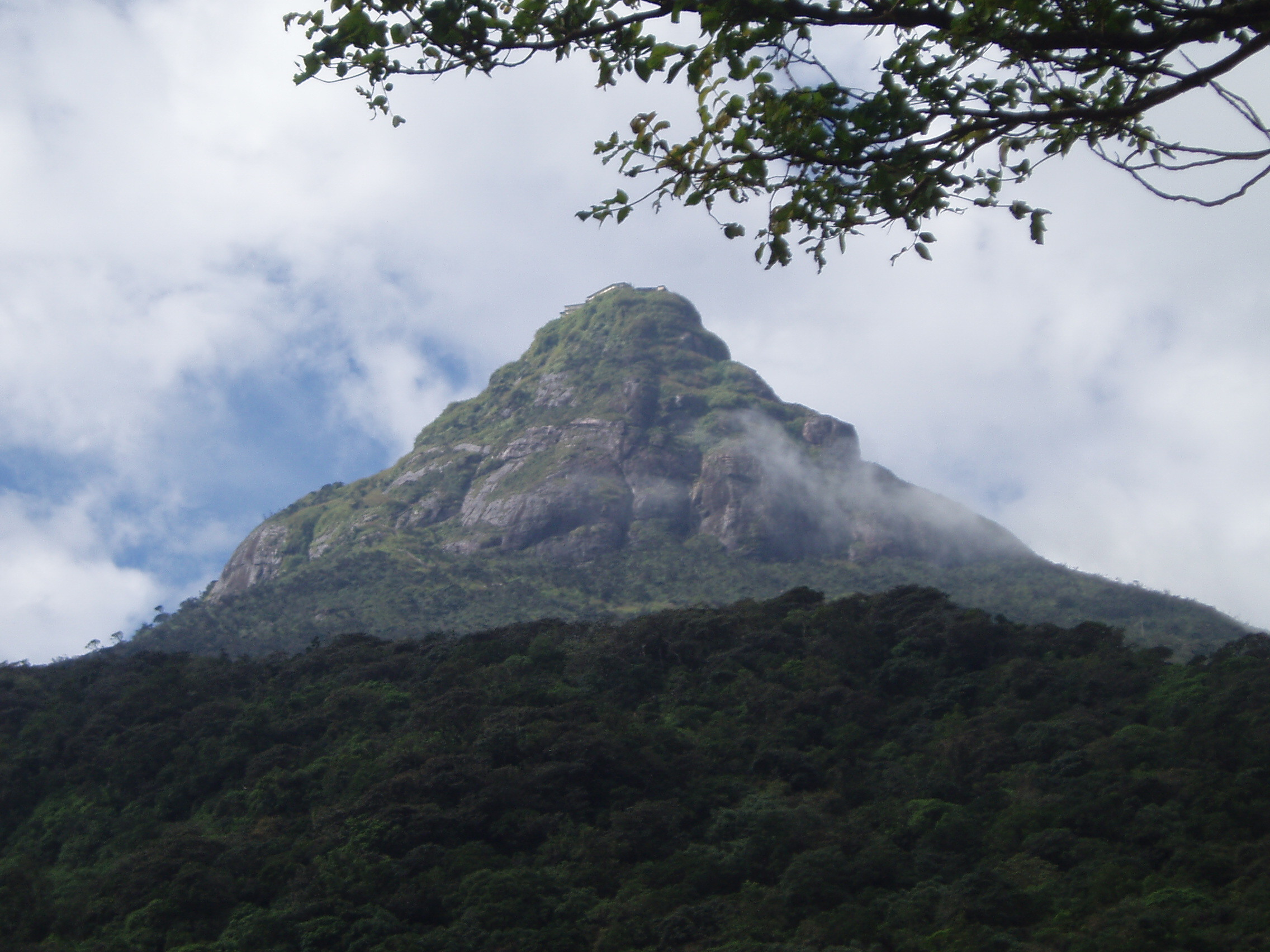
- Adam's Peak from a distance

Highest point
- Elevation: 2,243 m (7,359 ft)
- Coordinates: 6°48′34″N 80°29′59″E

Naming
- Native name: ශ්‍රී පාදය (සමනළ කන්ද) (Sinhala); சிவனொளிபாதமலை (Tamil)

Geography
- Location within Sri Lanka
- Location: Ratnapura District, Sri Lanka
- Parent range: Samanala

Adam's Peak is a 2,243-metre-tall (7,359-foot) conical sacred mountain and place of pilgrimage in central Sri Lanka, famous for the Sri Pada (IAST: Śrī Pāda; Sinhala: ශ්‍රී පාද, lit. 'sacred footprint'), a 1.8 m (5 ft 11 in) hollow, footprint-like rock formation near the summit whose name is also used for the mountain itself. The formation is identified differently by adherents of several religious traditions: in Buddhist tradition as the footprint of the Buddha; in Sri Lankan Hindu tradition as that of Hanuman or Shiva (its Tamil name, சிவனொளிபாதமலை, Sivanolipaathamalai, means 'Mountain of Shiva's Light'); and in some Islamic and Christian traditions as that of Adam or St. Thomas the Apostle.

In Buddhist sources the mountain is also known as Mount Malaya, particularly in the Mahayana Lankavatara Sutra, which states that the Buddha preached the sutra on its summit and describes the mountain as the abode of Ravana, overlord of the Rakshasas and ruler of Lanka. Other names found in Sanskrit sources include Mount Lanka, Ratnagiri ("Mountain of Gems"), Malayagiri, and Mount Rohana.

Adam's Peak is also regarded as the abode of the deity Saman and consequently bears several names associated with him, including Samanthakūta in Pali and Samonalakanda ("Mountain of Saman").

== Geography ==
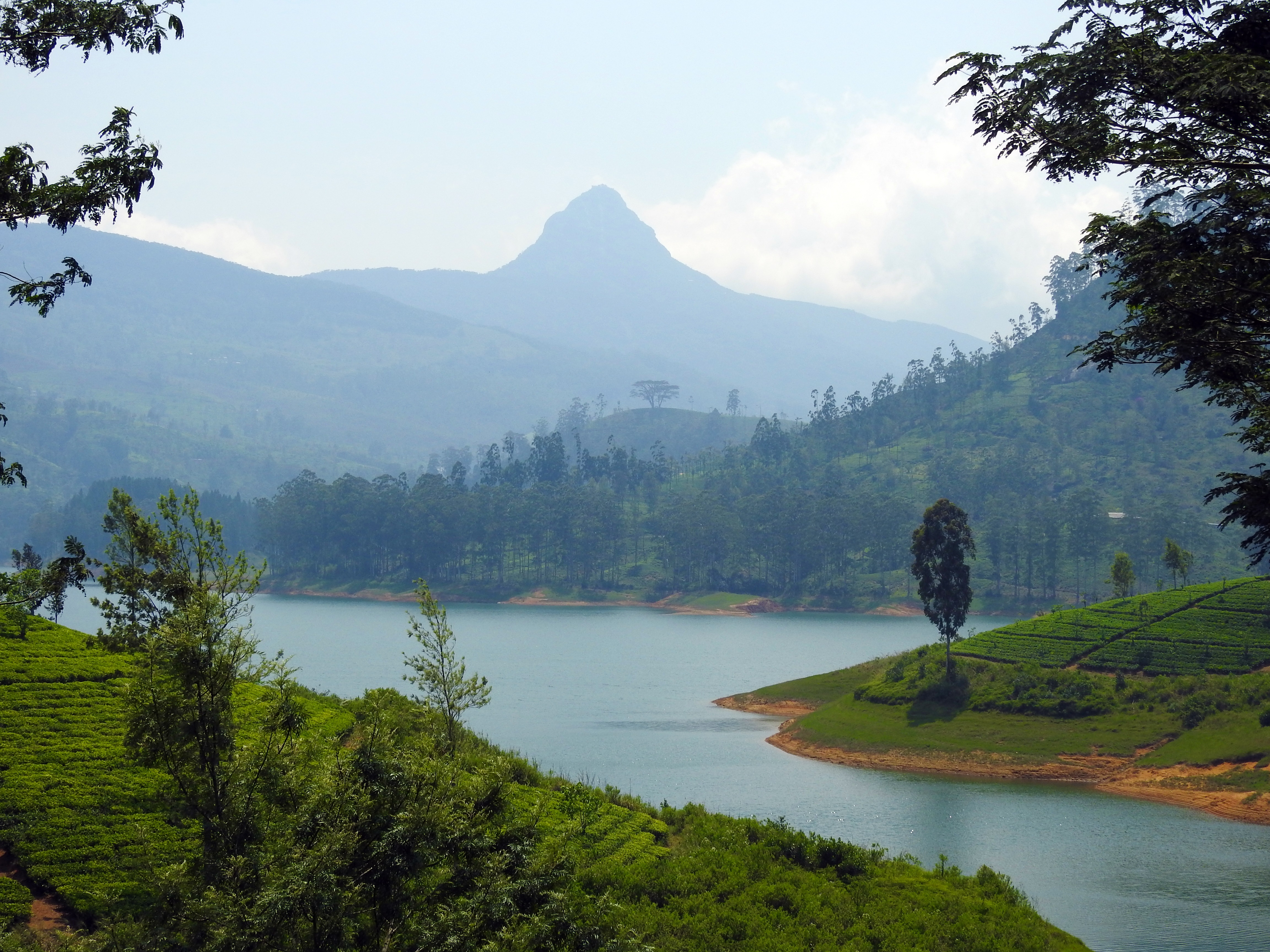
Adam's Peak from Maskeliya, in March 2018.

The mountain is located in the southern reaches of the Central Highlands in the Ratnapura District and Nuwara Eliya District of the Sabaragamuwa Province and Central Province—lying about 40 km (25 mi) northeast of Ratnapura and 32 km (20 mi) southwest of Hatton. The surrounding region is largely forested hills with no mountain of comparable size nearby. The region along the mountain is a wildlife reserve, housing many species varying from elephants to leopards, and including many endemic species.

Adam's Peak is important as a watershed. The districts to the south and the east of Adam's Peak yield precious stones—emeralds, rubies and sapphires, for which the island has been famous, and which earned for it the ancient name of Ratnadvipa.

Adam's Peak is the source of three major rivers in Sri Lanka: Kelani River, Walawe River, and the Kalu Ganga (river).

== Trails ==
Access to the mountain is possible by six trails: Ratnapura–Palabaddala, Hatton–Nallathanni, Kuruwita–Erathna, Murraywatte, Mookuwatte and Malimboda. The Nallathanni and Palabaddala routes are most favoured because they are shorter, better developed with facilities such as tea shops and lighting, and more accessible from transport hubs. The Kuruwita–Erathna trail is used less often because it is longer, more strenuous, less convenient to reach, and less supported by facilities compared to the more popular routes. These trails are linked to major cities or towns by bus, accounting for their popular use. The Murraywatte, Mookuwatte and Malimboda routes are seldom used but do intersect with the Palabaddala road midway through the ascent. The usual route taken by most pilgrims is ascent via Hatton and descent via Ratnapura. Although the Hatton trail is the steepest, it is also shorter than any of the other trails by approximately five kilometres.

Once one of the starting 'nodes' of Palabadalla, Nallathanni or Erathna is reached, the rest of the ascent is done on foot through the forested mountainside on the steps built into it. The greater part of the track leading from the base to the summit consists of thousands of steps built in cement or rough stones. The trails are illuminated with electric light during the six-months period considered in-season, making night-time ascent possible and safe to do even when accompanied by children. Rest stops and wayside shops along the trails serve refreshments and supplies during the same period.

Whilst there are many ancient monuments on the mountain, there is an important Peace Pagoda located halfway up, built by Nipponzan Myohoji in 1978.

== Nomenclature ==
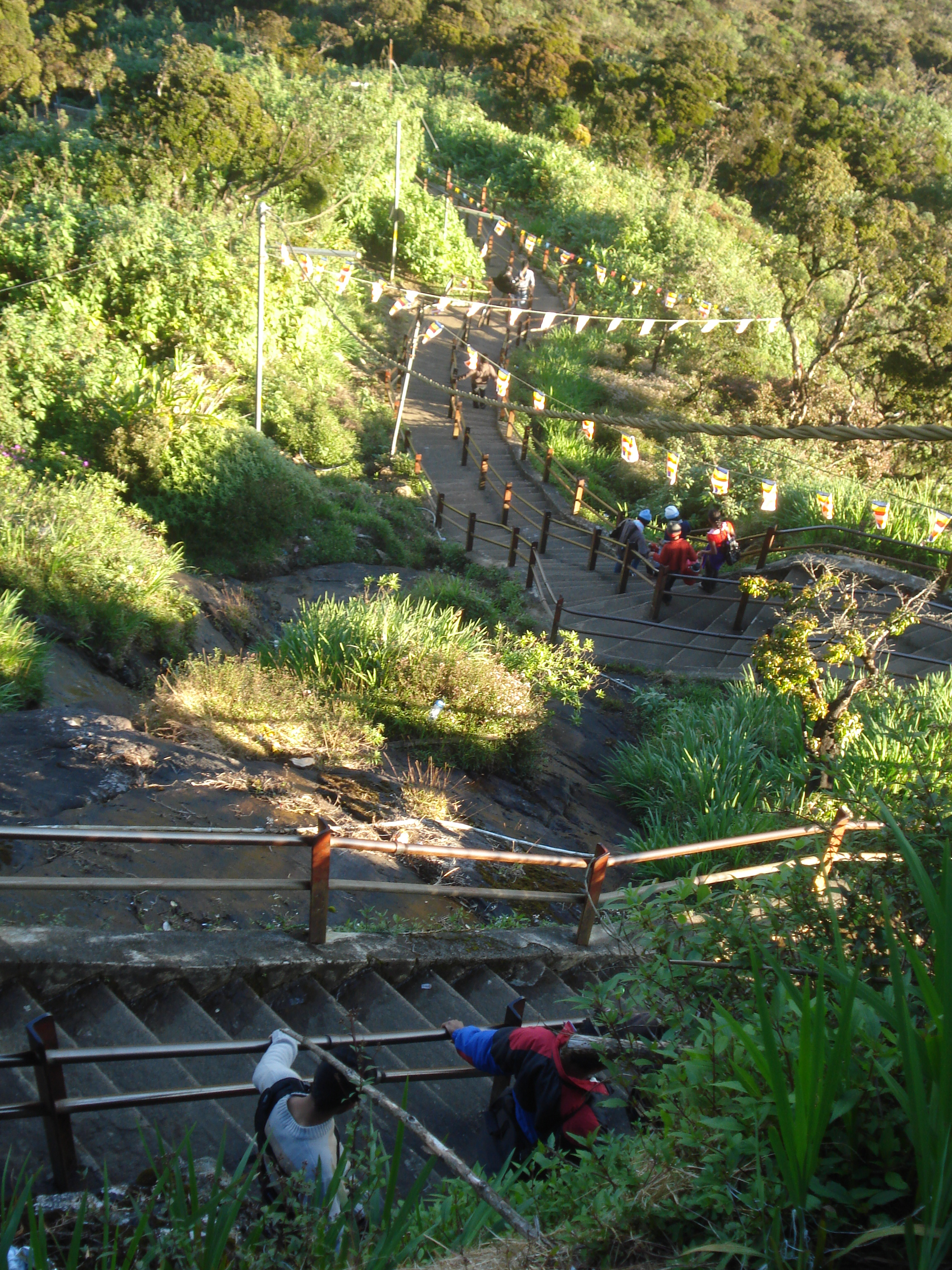
Mahagiri Dambaya

Due to its multicultural and religious significance to the various people that inhabit the country, the mountain is referred to by a variety of names.

The often used Sri Pada is derived from Sanskrit, used by the Sinhalese people in a religious context; this name also has meaning in Pāli, and may be translated roughly as "the sacred foot". It refers to the footprint-shaped mark at the summit, which is believed by Buddhists to be that of the Buddha. Some Christian and Islamic traditions assert that it is the footprint of Adam, left when first setting foot on Earth after having been cast out of paradise, giving it the name "Adam's Peak". Sri Lankan Hindu tradition refers to the footprint as that of the Hindu deity Shiva, and thus names the mountain Shiva padam (Shiva's foot) in Tamil. Tamils may also use the name Shivanolipatha Malai to refer to the mountain.

Another Sinhala name for the mountain is Samanalakanda, which refers either to the deity Saman, who is said to live upon the mountain, or to the butterflies (samanalayā) that frequent the mountain during their annual migrations to the region. The name Sri Paada, however, is the more commonly used.

Other local and historic names include Ratnagiri ("jewelled hill"), Samantakuta ("Peak of Saman"), Svargarohanam ("the climb to heaven"), Mount Rohana and other variations on the root Rohana.

== History ==
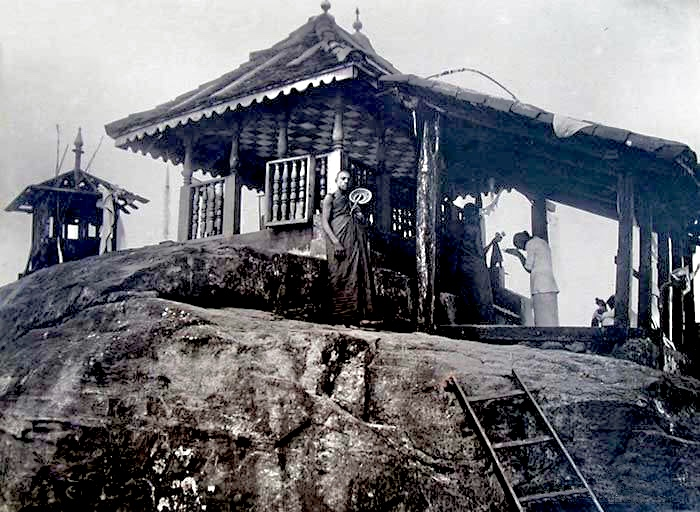
Sri Pada (Adam's Peak) in 1890, during the British rule in Ceylon (Sri Lanka)

Sri Pada is mentioned in the 5th-century chronicle Mahawamsa, where it is stated that the Buddha visited the mountain peak. The chronicle Rajavaliya states that King Valagamba (1st century BCE) had taken refuge in the forests of Adam's Peak against invaders from India, and later returned to Anuradhapura. The famous Chinese pilgrim and Buddhist traveller Fa Hien stayed in Sri Lanka in 411–12 CE and mentions Sri Pada although it is not made clear whether he actually visited it. The Mahawamsa again mentions the visit of King Vijayabahu I (1058–1114) to the mountain. King Vijayabahu I's Ambagamuwa rock inscription records that the king himself ascended the mountain and worshipped the Buddha's footprint on the mountain.

The Italian merchant Marco Polo in his Travels of 1298 CE noted that Adam's Peak was an important place of pilgrimage but did not mention a footprint in the rock. The Arab traveler Ibn Battuta climbed to the summit of the mountain which he called Sarandīb in 1344 CE. In his description, he mentions a stairway and iron stanchions with chains to help the pilgrims. The first ascent of the peak by an Englishman was made by Lieutenant William Malcolm of the 1st Ceylon Regiment on 26 April 1815, from the Ratnapura side; his account of the ascent was published in the Government Gazette on 10 May 1815. John Davy, brother of the noted chemist Sir Humphry Davy, visited the peak in 1817. He recorded observing an oversized footprint carved in stone and ornamented with a single margin of brass and studded with gems.

== Sacred mountain ==
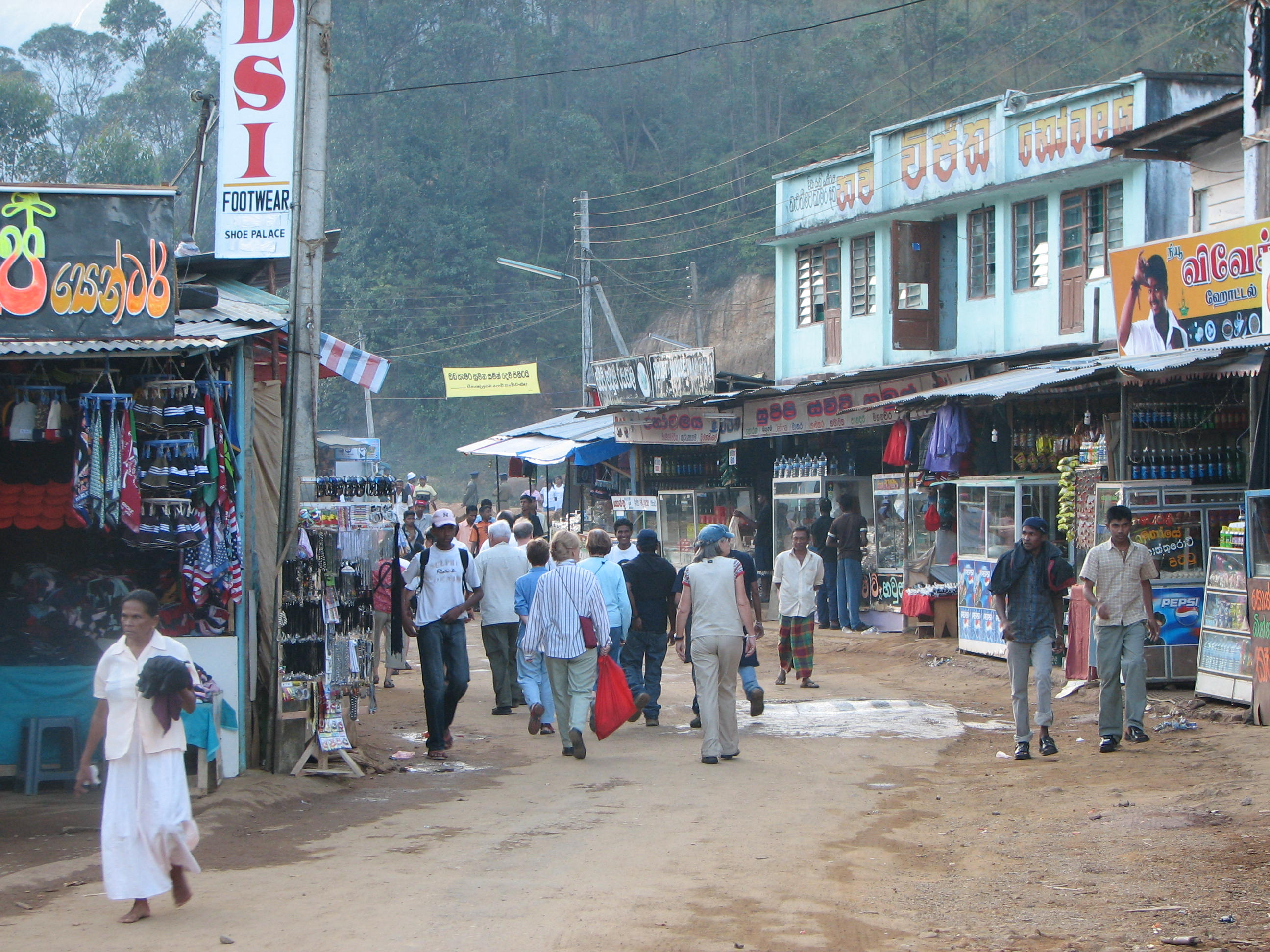
The village of Nallathanniya at the foot of the mountain, where the stairs begin

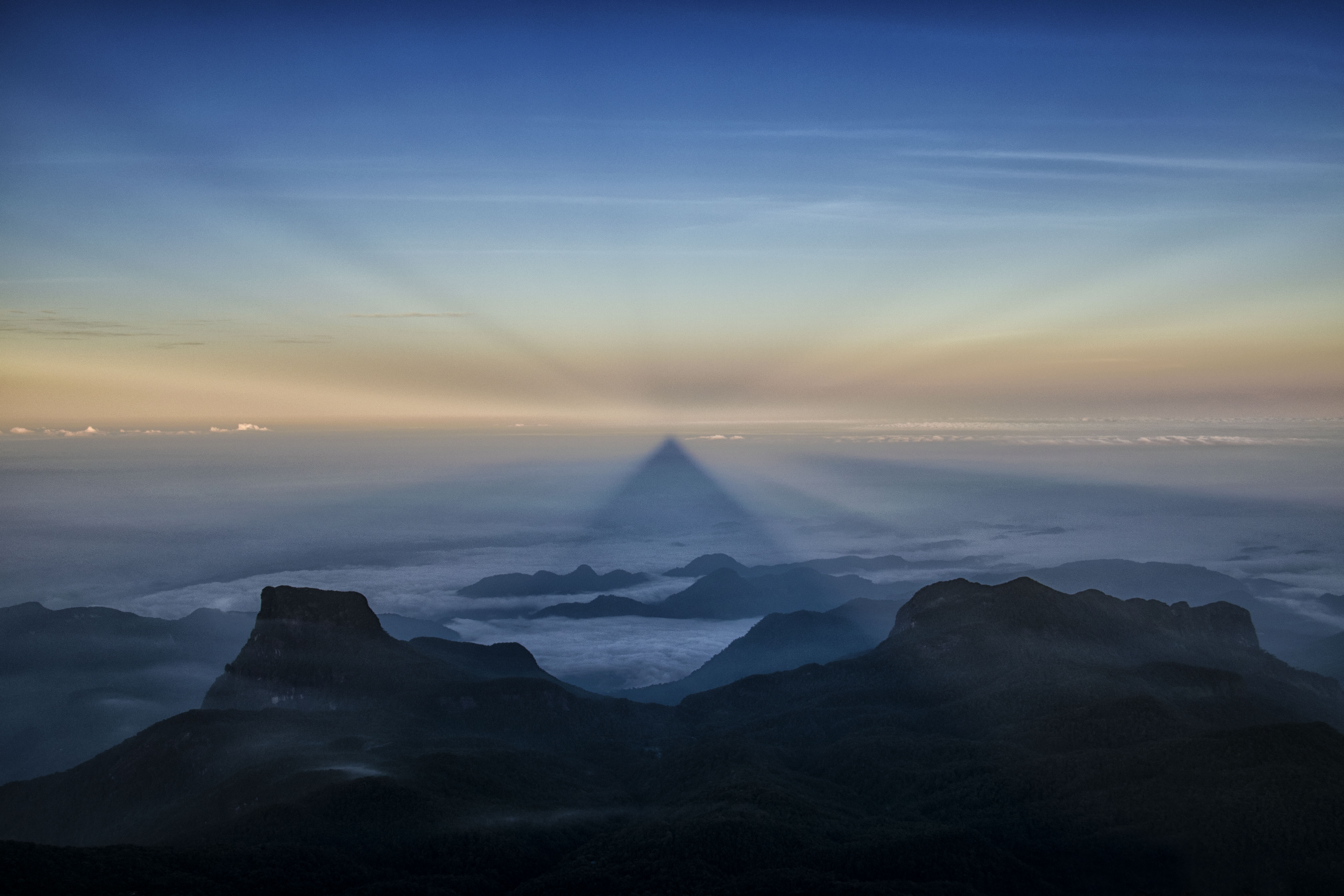
Conical shadow of Adam's Peak at sunrise (6:34 am)

It is revered as a holy site by Buddhists, Sri Lankan Hindus, and some Muslims and Christians. It has specific qualities that cause it to stand out and be noticed, including its dominant and outstanding profile, and the boulder at the peak containing an indentation resembling a footprint. According to the Encyclopædia Britannica Eleventh Edition:

For a long period Adam's Peak was supposed to be the highest mountain in Ceylon, but actual survey makes it only 7353 ft. above sea-level. This elevation is chiefly remarkable as the resort of pilgrims from all parts of the East. The hollow in the lofty rock that crowns the summit is said by the Brahmans to be the footstep of Siva, by the Buddhists of Buddha, by the Mahommedans of Adam, whilst the Portuguese Christians were divided between the conflicting claims of St Thomas and the eunuch of Kandake, queen of Ethiopia. The footstep is covered by a handsome roof, and is guarded by the priests of a rich monastery half-way up the mountain, who maintain a shrine on the summit of the peak.

It is an important pilgrimage site, especially for Buddhists. Pilgrims walk up the mountain, following a variety of difficult routes up thousands of steps. The journey takes several hours at least.

The mountain is most often scaled from December to May. During other months it is hard to climb the mountain due to very heavy rain, extreme wind, and thick mist. The peak pilgrimage season is in April, and the goal is to be on top of the mountain at sunrise when the distinctive shape of the mountain casts a triangular shadow on the surrounding plain and can be seen to move quickly downward as the sun rises.

=== Legends ===
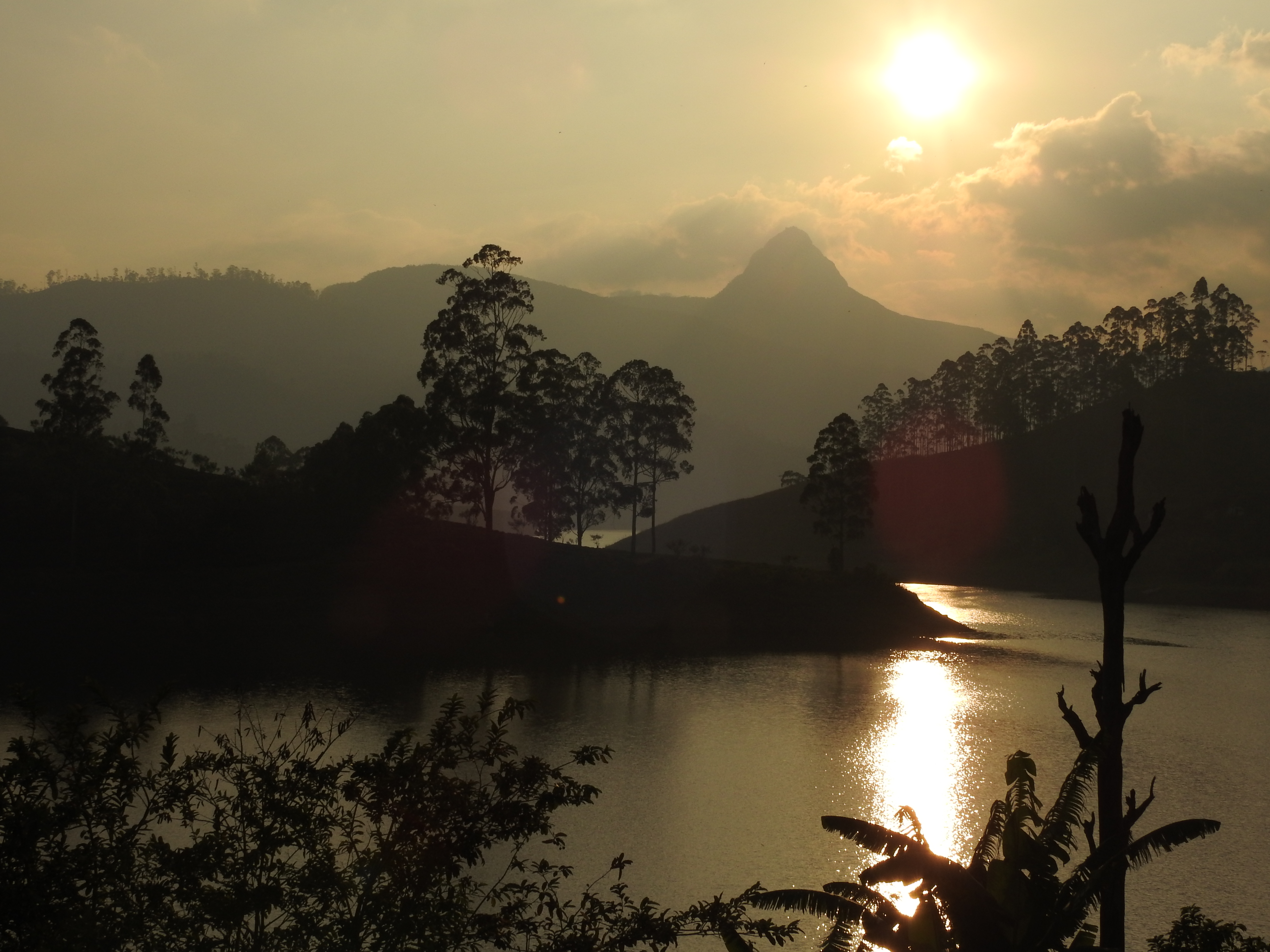
A view of Adam's peak from Maskeliya during sunset

For Buddhists, the footprint mark is the left foot of the Buddha, left behind when Buddha visited Sri Lanka in the 6th century BCE for the third and last time, as a symbol for worship at the invitation of the Buddhist god Saman.

Tamil Hindus consider it the footprint of Shiva. It is also fabled that the mountain is the legendary mount Trikuta, the capital of Ravana in the Ramayana from where he ruled Lanka.

A bell lies on top of the temple and tradition holds that pilgrims can ring it as many times as they have achieved the pilgrimage to the top of the peak.

A shrine to Saman, a Buddhist deity (people who have spent spiritual lives during their life on earth and done pacificist service are deified by Sri Lankan Buddhists) charged with protecting the mountain top, can be found near the footprint.

== See also ==
- List of rivers of Sri Lanka
- Petrosomatoglyph
- Dalhousie, Sri Lanka
