= Haputale =

Haputale හපුතලේ ஹபுதலே
- town
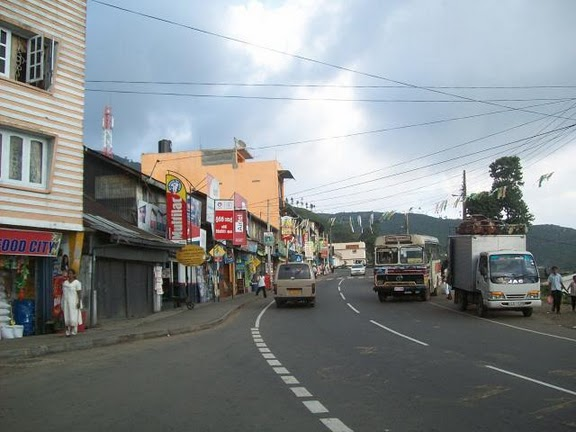

- Location within Sri Lanka
- Coordinates: 6°46′4″N 80°57′31″E
- Province: Uva Province

Population
  - Total: 54,989
- Time zone: UTC+5:30 (Sri Lanka Standard Time Zone)

Haputale (Sinhala: හපුතලේ; Tamil: ஹபுதலே) is a town of Badulla District in the Uva Province, Sri Lanka, governed by an Urban Council. The elevation is 1431 m (4695 ft) above the sea level. The area has a rich bio-diversity dense with numerous varieties of flora and fauna. Haputale is surrounded by hills covered with cloud forests and tea plantations. The town has a cooler climate than its surroundings, due to its elevation. The Haputale pass allows views across the Southern plains of Sri Lanka. The South-West boundary of Uva basin is marked by the Haputale mountain ridges, which continue on to Horton Plains and Adam's Peak to the west. CNN in 2010 named Haputale as one of Asia's most overlooked destinations.

== Transport ==
=== Roads ===
  - A16 highway (Beragala-Hali Ela) a part of the Colombo-Badulla road. (Route 99)
  - B147 (Haputale-Dambetenna) road.
  - Haputale-Welimada road. (Via Boralanda)
  - Haputale-Diyatalawa road. (via Yahalabedda)
  - Haputale-Wellawaya road. (Via Beragala and Koslanda)

=== Rail ===
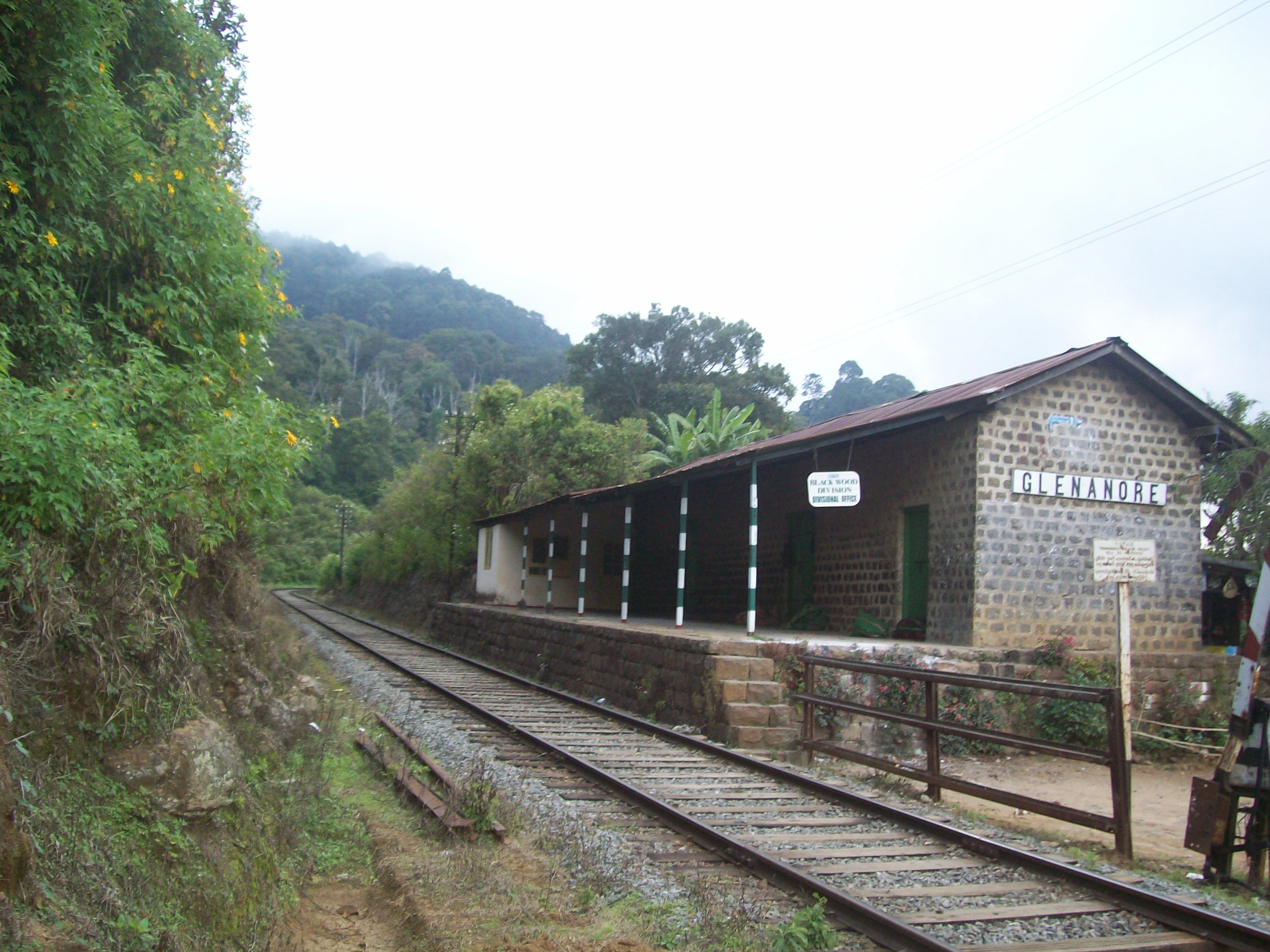
Goods shed used by the Planters

Haputale railway station is the 69th station on the Main Line. The station opened on 19 June 1893, following the extension of the main line from Nanu Oya railway station to Haputale.

== Population ==
	Total	Sinhala	Sri Lankan Tamil	Indian Tamil	Muslim	Other
Urban	5238	1441	1105	1406	1285	1
Rural	31676	27817	1012	718	1968	161
Estate	18075	726	2952	14091	228	78
Total	54989	29984	5069	16215	3481	240

Religious composition in Haputale DS Division according to 2012 census data is as follows Buddhists 26,212-52.64%, Hindus 17,312-34.76%, Islam 3,665-7.36%, Roman Catholics 2,025-4.07%, Other Christians 574-1.15%, Others 10-0.02%.

== Places of interest ==
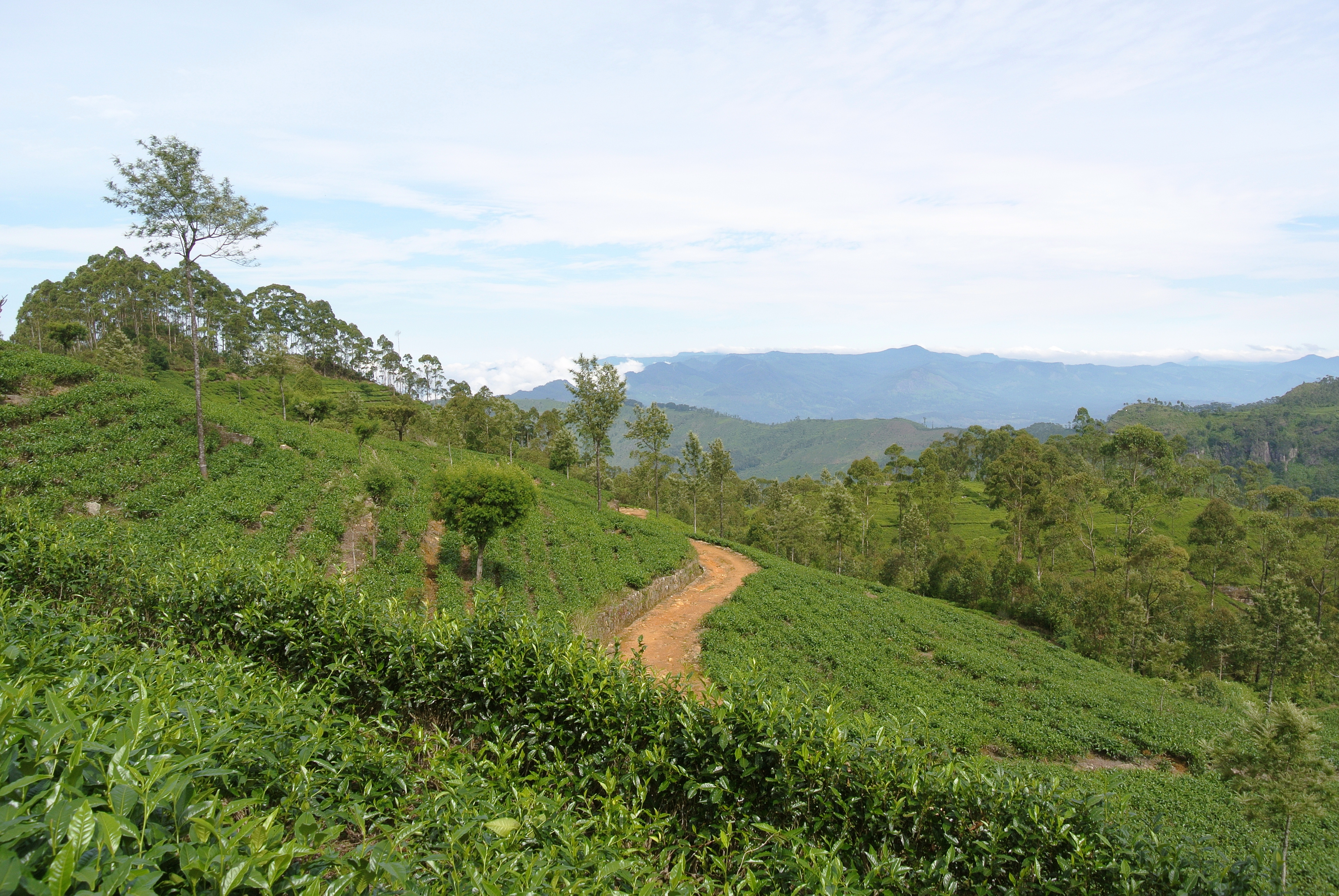
The Dambatenne tea plantation in Haputale

- Horton Plains National Park Via Boralanda
- Adisham Bungalow
- Lipton's Seat
- St. Andrew's Church
- Diyaluma Falls
- Bambarakanda Falls
- Soragune Devalaya
- Haldummulla town
- Beragala Gap
- Dambetenna
- Idalgashinna
- Thangamale Sanctuary (Protected areas of Sri Lanka)

=== Adisham Bungalow ===
Adisham Bungalow is a nineteenth-century British period building, which was modelled on Leeds Castle in Kent, England. Sir Thomas Villiers, a distinguished British resident in Sri Lanka in the early 20th century, used it as his country house. Later it became a Benedictine monastery. The Thangamale Bird Sanctuary is located next to the bungalow.

=== Lipton’s Seat ===
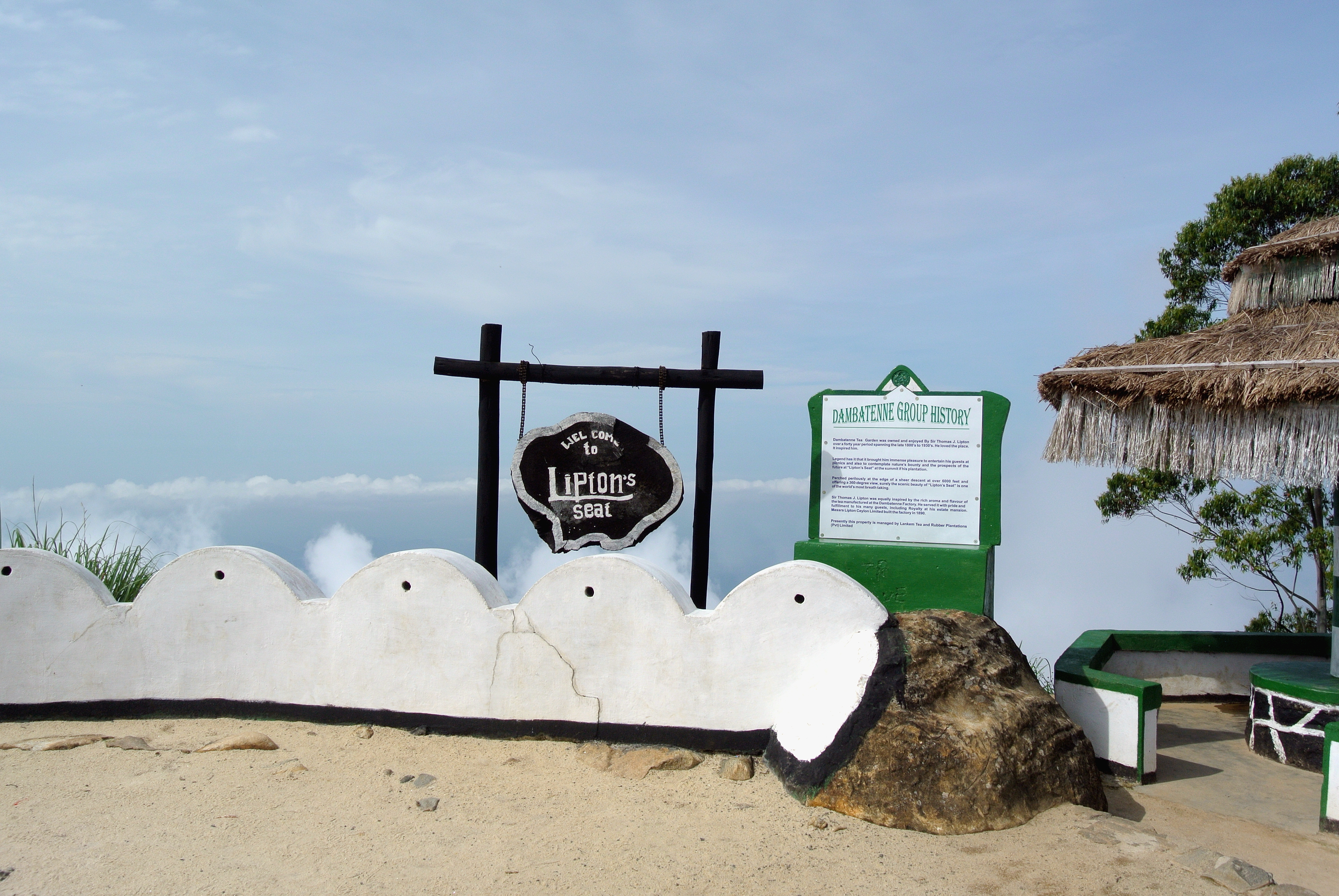
Lipton’s Seat

The Lipton’s Seat is located at Dambetenna in the Haputale Mountain region. This place was a favourite look-outpoint for Sir Thomas Lipton. The point has views over Uva, Southern, Sabaragamuwa, Central and Eastern provinces.

== Climate ==
Köppen-Geiger climate classification system classifies its climate as subtropical highland (Cfb).

Climate data for Haputhale
Month	Jan	Feb	Mar	Apr	May	Jun	Jul	Aug	Sep	Oct	Nov	Dec	Year
Mean daily maximum °C (°F)	21 (70)	21.9 (71.4)	24.7 (76.5)	26.1 (79.0)	24.3 (75.7)	23.8 (74.8)	23 (73)	23.2 (73.8)	24.1 (75.4)	22.8 (73.0)	22.5 (72.5)	21.4 (70.5)	23.2 (73.8)
Daily mean °C (°F)	17.3 (63.1)	17.7 (63.9)	18.8 (65.8)	19.7 (67.5)	20.1 (68.2)	19.8 (67.6)	19.3 (66.7)	19.4 (66.9)	19.2 (66.6)	18.6 (65.5)	18.2 (64.8)	17.7 (63.9)	18.8 (65.9)
Mean daily minimum °C (°F)	13.6 (56.5)	13.6 (56.5)	13 (55)	13.3 (55.9)	16 (61)	15.8 (60.4)	15.7 (60.3)	15.6 (60.1)	14.4 (57.9)	14.4 (57.9)	14 (57)	14 (57)	14.5 (58.0)
Average precipitation mm (inches)	171 (6.7)	118 (4.6)	142 (5.6)	234 (9.2)	155 (6.1)	48 (1.9)	56 (2.2)	81 (3.2)	115 (4.5)	267 (10.5)	295 (11.6)	256 (10.1)	1,938 (76.2)
Source: Climate-Data.org (altitude: 1472m)

== Members of Parliament ==
The constituency has been represented in Parliament by:

- J. A. Rambukpota 1947–1952
- Wilfred A. Ratwatte 1952–1956
- W. P. G. Ariyadasa 1956–1977
- W. J. M. Lokubandara 1977–1988

== See also ==
- Towns in Uva
- History of Uva Province
- Media related to Haputale at Wikimedia Commons
