= Demodara =

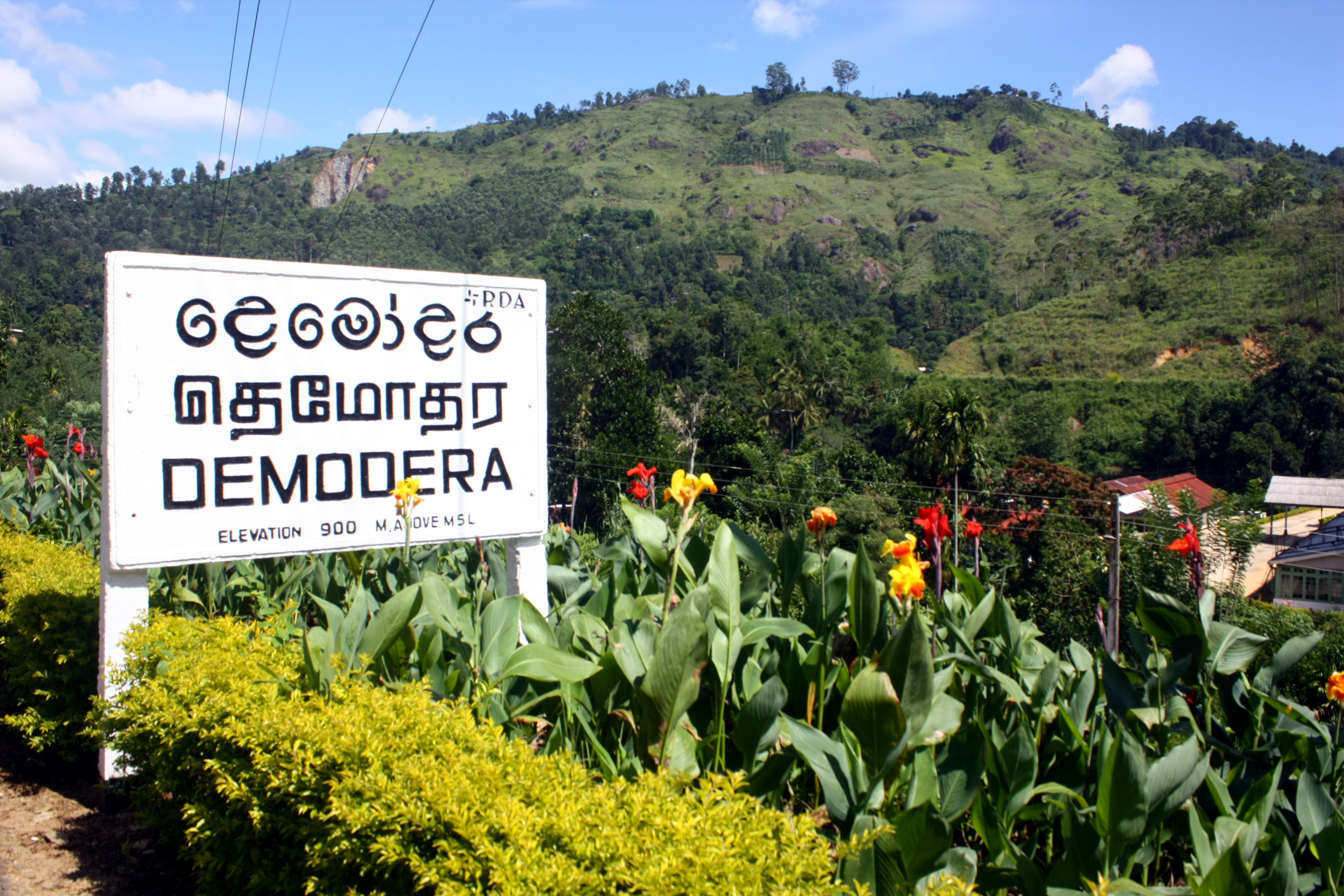
- The entrance sign to Demodara

- Location within Sri Lanka
- Coordinates: 6°54′00″N 81°03′00″E
- Country: Sri Lanka
- Province: Uva
- District: Badulla
- Elevation: 900 m (3,000 ft)

Population (2015)
  - Total: 3,990
  - Density: 537.6/km^{2} (1,392/sq mi)
- Time zone: UTC+5:30 (Sri Lanka Standard Time Zone)
  - Summer (DST): UTC+6 (Summer time)
- Postal code: 90080

Demodera is a town in the central highlands of Sri Lanka, located in the Badulla District of Uva Province.

It is approximately 14 km (9 mi) south of Badulla (the capital of Uva Province), on the A16 (Beragala - Hali Ela road).

== Transport ==
It is served by railway station of the Sri Lanka Railways on the Badulla branch. There is a spiral at this location. It is easily visible from the Demodara railway station. This involves a tunnel which actually runs beneath the Demodara railway station. On the track which exists, the tunnel winds around a mountain, continuously ascending to end up at a higher elevation on what was the mountain under which the tunnel is built.

== See also ==
- Railway stations in Sri Lanka
- Nine Arch Bridge, Demodara
