= Ella, Sri Lanka =

Ella ඇල්ල எல்ல
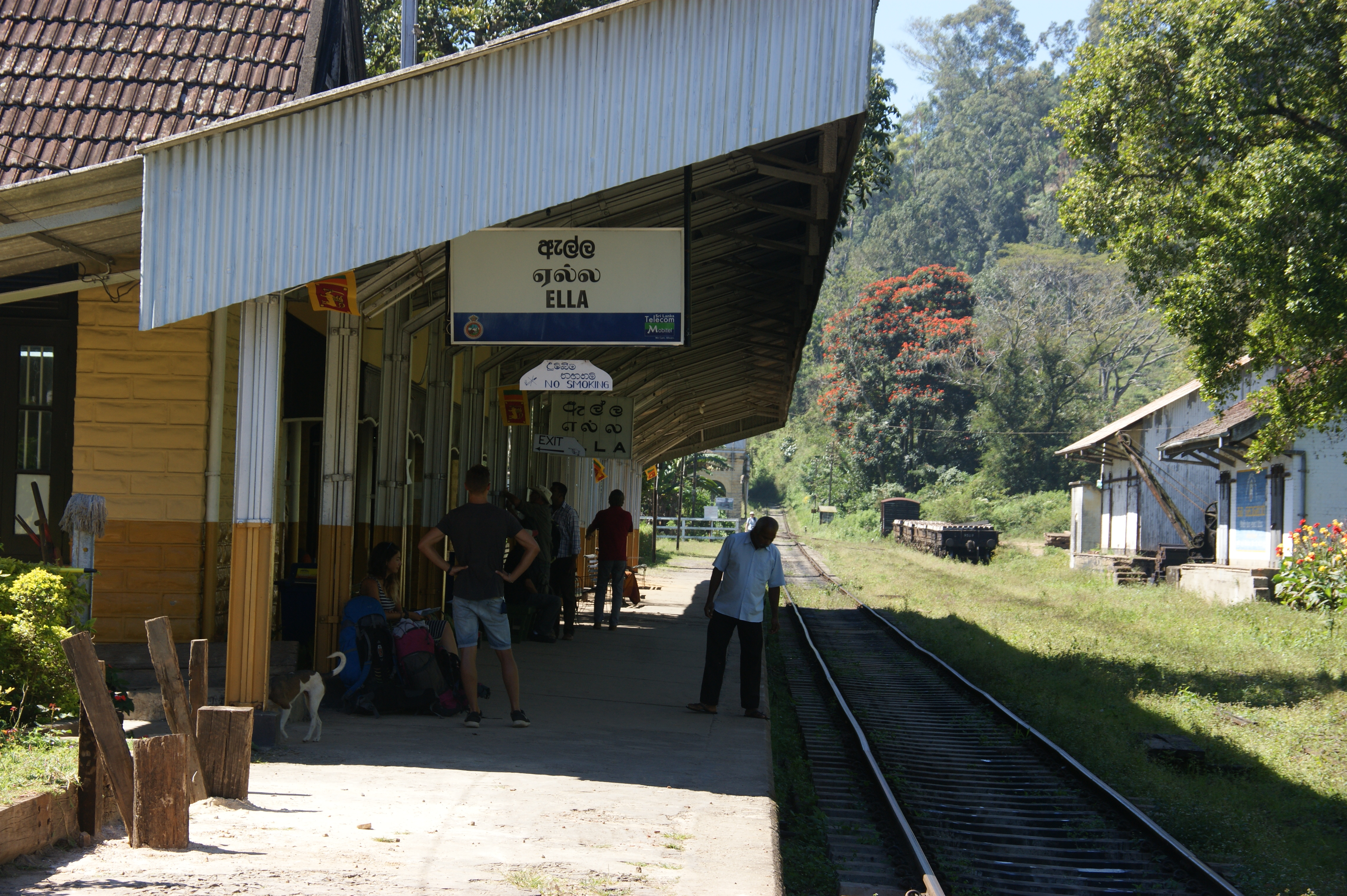
- Ella Railway Station

- Location within Sri Lanka
- Coordinates: 6°52′31″N 81°2′18″E
- Country: Sri Lanka
- Province: Uva Province
- District: Badulla District
- Elevation: 1,041 m (3,415 ft)

Population (2012)
  - Total: 45,181
- Time zone: UTC+5:30 (Sri Lanka Standard Time Zone)
  - Summer (DST): UTC+6 (Summertime)
- Post Code: 90090
- Website: www.ellaguide.com.

Ella (Sinhala: ඇල්ල, lit. 'fall', [ællə]; Tamil: எல்ல) is a small town in the Badulla District of Uva Province, Sri Lanka governed by Ella Pradeshiya Sabha. It is approximately 200 kilometres (120 mi) east of Colombo and is situated at an elevation of 1,041 metres (3,415 ft) above sea level. The area has a rich bio-diversity, dense with numerous varieties of flora and fauna. Ella is surrounded by hills covered with cloud forests and tea plantations. The town has a cooler climate than surrounding lowlands, due to its elevation. The Ella Gap allows views across the southern plains of Sri Lanka.

== Transport ==
=== Road ===
Located on the Colombo-Badulla railway line, and the A16 highway (Beragala-Hali Ela) a part of the Colombo-Badulla road.

=== Rail ===
Ella railway station is the 75th station on the Main Line and is located 271.03 km (168.41 mi) from Colombo. The station has one platform and all trains running on the Main Line stop at the station. The station opened in July 1918.

== Facilities ==
Notable government institutions are :

- Police station
- Railway station
- Main post office

== Attractions ==
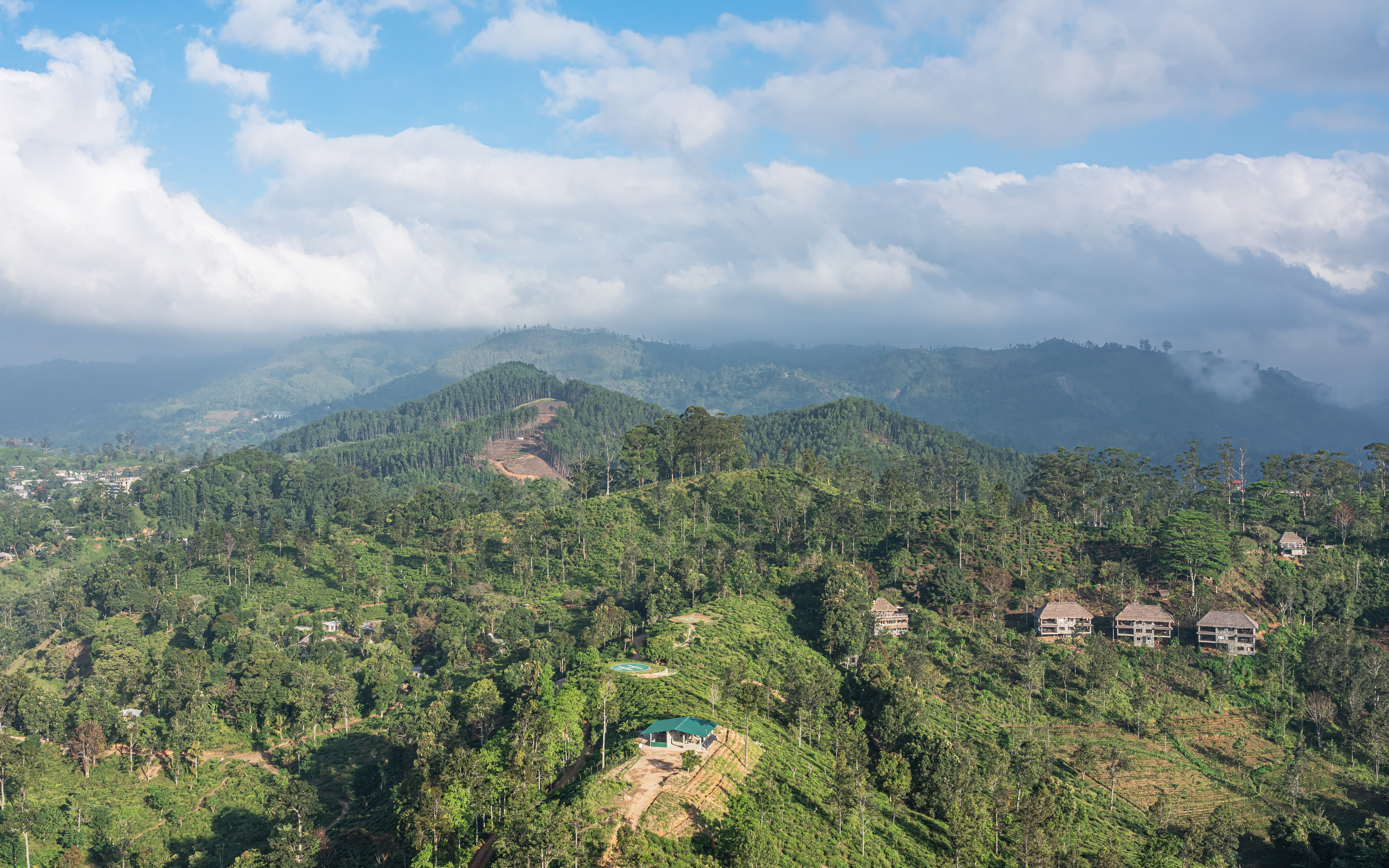
View of Ella from Little Adam's Peak

- Dhowa temple, a 2,000-year-old rock temple, is located on the Badulla-Bandarawela Road. It contains a 12 metres (39 ft) unfinished Buddha statue carved into the surrounding rock.
- Bambaragala Peak
- Ella Rock, a lookout point
- Little Adam's Peak (Punchi Shri Padhaya), a 1,141 m (3,743 ft) pyramidal-shaped hill, located to the southeast of the town. Named after the larger Adam's Peak.
- Ravana Ella, a 25 m (82 ft) waterfall, located approximately 6 km (4 mi) away from the town
- Nine Arches Bridge, Demodara
- Diyaluma Falls, a 220 m (720 ft) waterfall
- Yahalamadiththa temple
- Ravana cave
- Nildiya Pokuna

== Demographics ==
Ella DS Division (2012)

Ethnicity	Population	% Of Total
Sinhalese	30,125	66.67
Indian Tamils	11,985	26.53
Sri Lankan Tamils	1,134	2.51
Sri Lankan Moors	1,859	4.11
Other (including Burgher, Malay)	78	0.17
Total	45,181	100

== See also ==
- Towns in Uva
- History of Uva Province
