= Haputale Electoral District =

Electoral district of Sri Lanka

Haputale electoral district was an electoral district of Sri Lanka between August 1947 and February 1989. The district was named after the town of Haputale in Badulla District, Uva Province. The 1978 Constitution of Sri Lanka introduced the proportional representation electoral system for electing members of Parliament. The existing 160 mainly single-member electoral districts were replaced with 22 multi-member electoral districts. Haputale electoral district was replaced by the Badulla multi-member electoral district at the 1989 general elections, the first under the proportional representation system, though Badulla continues to be a polling division of the multi-member electoral district.

== Members of Parliament ==
Key

Independent SLFP UNP

Election	Member	Party	Term
1947	J. A. Rambukpota	UNP	1947 - 1952
1952	Wilfred A. Ratwatte	UNP	1952 - 1956
1956	W. P. G. Ariyadasa	SLFP	1956 - 1977
1960 (March)	W. P. G. Ariyadasa	SLFP	1956 - 1977
1960 (July)	W. P. G. Ariyadasa	SLFP	1956 - 1977
1965	W. P. G. Ariyadasa	SLFP	1956 - 1977
1970	W. P. G. Ariyadasa	SLFP	1956 - 1977
1977	W. J. M. Lokubandara	UNP	1977 - 1989

== Elections ==
=== 1947 Parliamentary General Election ===
Results of the 1st parliamentary election held between 23 August 1947 and 20 September 1947:

Candidate	Party	Symbol	Votes	%
J. A. Rambukpota	United National Party	Key	2,124	30.80
A. D. Sengamalai	Independent	House	1,753	25.42
R. A. Nadesan	Ceylon India Congress	Umbrella	1,337	19.39
A. Patchamuthu	Bolshevik Samasamaja Party	Elephant	1,229	17.82
J. G. Rajakulendran	United National Party	Hand	327	4.74
Valid Votes			6,770	98.16
Rejected Votes			127	1.84
Total Polled			6,897	100.00
Registered Electors			11,123	
Turnout				62.00

=== 1952 Parliamentary General Election ===
Results of the 2nd parliamentary election held between 24 May 1952 and 30 May 1952:

Candidate	Party	Symbol	Votes	%
Wilfred A. Ratwatte	United National Party	Lamp	2,444	48.75
Jayasena Perera Bulathsinghalage		Key	820	16.35
W. P. G. Ariyadasa		Star	650	12.97
Vere E. H. de Mel		Hand	518	10.33
W. Arthur de Silva		Elephant	432	8.62
K. Sivasamy		Glasses	94	1.88
Valid Votes			4,958	98.90
Rejected Votes			55	1.10
Total Polled			5,013	100.00
Registered Electors			7,051	
Turnout				71.10

=== 1956 Parliamentary General Election ===
Results of the 3rd parliamentary election held between 5 April 1956 and 10 April 1956:

Candidate	Party	Symbol	Votes	%
W. P. G. Ariyadasa	Sri Lanka Freedom Party	Hand	4,678	77.39
Wilfred A. Ratwatte	United National Party	Elephant	1,326	21.94
Valid Votes			6,004	99.32
Rejected Votes			41	0.68
Total Polled			6,045	100.00
Registered Electors			9,442	
Turnout				64.02

=== 1960 (March) Parliamentary General Election ===
Results of the 4th parliamentary election held on 19 March 1960:

Candidate	Party	Symbol	Votes	%
W. P. G. Ariyadasa	Sri Lanka Freedom Party	Hand	3,655	47.19
P. B. Sannasgala	United National Party	Elephant	1,984	25.61
Wijesiri Nanayakkara		Key	837	10.81
D. L. W. Rajapakse		Sun	482	6.22
M. Arunasalam		Tree	428	5.53
Bertram Jayasinghe		Cartwheel	256	3.30
Valid Votes			7,642	98.66
Rejected Votes			104	1.34
Total Polled			7,746	100.00
Registered Electors			10,344	
Turnout				74.88

=== 1960 (July) Parliamentary General Election ===
Results of the 5th parliamentary election held on 20 July 1960:

Candidate	Party	Symbol	Votes	%
W. P. G. Ariyadasa	Sri Lanka Freedom Party	Hand	4,335	58.66
N. G. S. Panditharatne	United National Party	Elephant	2,860	38.7
Nanayakkarage Wijesiri		Cartwheel	129	1.75
Valid Votes			7,324	99.11%
Rejected Votes			66	0.89
Total Polled			7,390	100.00
Registered Electors			10,344	
Turnout				71.44

=== 1965 Parliamentary General Election ===
Results of the 6th parliamentary election held on 22 March 1965:

Candidate	Party	Symbol	Votes	%
W. P. G. Ariyadasa	Sri Lanka Freedom Party	Hand	5,740	49.89
R. M. Appuhamy		Lamp	4,661	40.51
B. Jayasena Perera		Chair	667	5.80
W. Gawarammana		Aeroplane	300	2.61
Valid Votes			11,368	98.81
Rejected Votes			137	1.19
Total Polled			11,505	100.00
Registered Electors			14,457	
Turnout				79.58

=== 1970 Parliamentary General Election ===
Results of the 7th parliamentary election held on 27 May 1970:

Candidate	Party	Symbol	Votes	%
W. P. G. Ariyadasa	Sri Lanka Freedom Party	Hand	8,339	54.41
W. G. M. Jayawickreme	United National Party	Elephant	6,896	44.99
Valid Votes			15,235	99.40
Rejected Votes			92	0.60
Total Polled			15,327	100.00
Registered Electors			17,821	
Turnout				86.01

=== 1977 Parliamentary General Election ===
Results of the 8th parliamentary election held on 21 July 1977:

Candidate	Party	Symbol	Votes	%
W. J. M. Lokubandara	United National Party	Elephant	10,818	57.41
H. M. C. Dissanayake	Sri Lanka Freedom Party	Hand	7,446	39.51
L. A. Gunawardena		Key	274	1.45
S. Hemadasa		Lamp	226	1.20
Valid Votes			18,764	99.57
Rejected Votes			81	0.43
Total Polled			18,845	100.00
Registered Electors			22,166	
Turnout				85.02
