= Alutnuwara Electoral District =

Electoral district of Sri Lanka

Alutnuwara electoral district was an electoral district of Sri Lanka between August 1947 and March 1960. The district was named after the town of Alutnuwara in Ratnapura District, Sabaragamuwa Province. The 1978 Constitution of Sri Lanka introduced the proportional representation electoral system for electing members of Parliament. The existing 160 mainly single-member electoral districts were replaced with 22 multi-member electoral districts. Alutnuwara electoral district was replaced by the Ratnapura multi-member electoral district at the 1989 general elections, the first under the proportional representation system.

== Members of Parliament ==
Key

Independent SLFP UNP

Election	Member	Party	Term
1947	D. Ramanujam	CIC	1947-1952
1952	J. A. Rambukpota	UNP	1952-155
1955 by-election	E. B. Dimbulane	UNP	1955-1956
1956	K. D. Goonaratne	SLFP	1956-1960

== Elections ==
=== 1947 Parliamentary General Election ===
Results of the 1st parliamentary election held between 23 August 1947 and 20 September 1947:

Candidate	Party	Symbol	Votes	%
D. Ramanujam	Ceylon India Congress	Lamp	2,772	46.64
K. D. Goonaratne	Independent	Pair of Scales	1,335	22.46
T. M. A. Ratnayake	Independent	Star	567	9.54
C. E. Kumbalwela	United National Party	Umbrella	522	8.78
W. H. Ratnayaka	Independent	Elephant	310	5.22
P. B. M. Bandaranayake	Independent	Hand	147	2.47
Valid Votes			5,653	95.12
Rejected Votes			290	4.88
Total Polled			5,943	100.00
Registered Electors			16,487	
Turnout				36.05

=== 1952 Parliamentary General Election ===
Results of the 2nd parliamentary election held between 24 May 1952 and 30 May 1952:

Candidate	Party	Symbol	Votes	%
J. A. Rambukpota	United National Party	Key	3,595	50.94
K. D. Goonaratne	Independent	Pair of Scales	815	11.55
M. B. Kotagama	Independent	Elephant	814	11.54
K. B. Herath	Lanka Sama Samaja Party	Hand	800	11.34
Cuda Banda Bibile	NLSSP	Lamp	640	9.07
Paramasivam Arunachalam	Independent	Star	185	2.62
Valid Votes			6,849	97.05
Rejected Votes			208	2.95
Total Polled			7,057	100.00
Registered Electors			16,190	
Turnout				43.59

=== 1955 Parliamentary By-Election ===
Results of the parliamentary by-election held on 28 May 1955:

Candidate	Party	Symbol	Votes	%
E. B. Dimbulane	United National Party	Umbrella	5,291	57.71
Daya Gunasekera	Lanka Sama Samaja Party	Hand	2,177	23.74
C. B. Palagolla	Sri Lanka Freedom Party	Elephant	954	10.41
K. B. Herath	Communist Party	Star	504	5.50
Valid Votes			8,926	97.35
Rejected Votes			243	2.65
Total Polled			9,169	100.00
Registered Electors			16,190	
Turnout			56.63	

=== 1956 Parliamentary General Election ===
Results of the 3rd parliamentary election held between 5 April 1956 and 10 April 1956:

Candidate	Party	Symbol	Votes	%
K. D. Goonaratne	Sri Lanka Freedom Party	Hand	5,339	64.15
E. B. Dimbulane	United National Party	Elephant	2,891	34.74
Valid Votes			8,230	98.88
Rejected Votes			93	1.12
Total Polled			8,323	100.00
Registered Electors			19,717	
Turnout				42.21
