= West Watta =

Coordinates: 7°31′N 80°39′E

- Village
- Interactive map of West Watta
- Country: Sri Lanka
- Province: Central Province
- Time zone: UTC+5:30 (Sri Lanka Standard Time)

West Watta is a village in Sri Lanka. It is located within Central Province, slightly southeast. The A2 road runs through the village; it is close to the Kinkini Wehera Raja Maha Viharaya Buddhist Temple and next to the Kirindi Oya River.

== See also ==
- List of towns in Central Province, Sri Lanka
