= St. Andrew's Church, Haputale =

Coordinates: 6°46′9.93″N 80°57′39.38″E

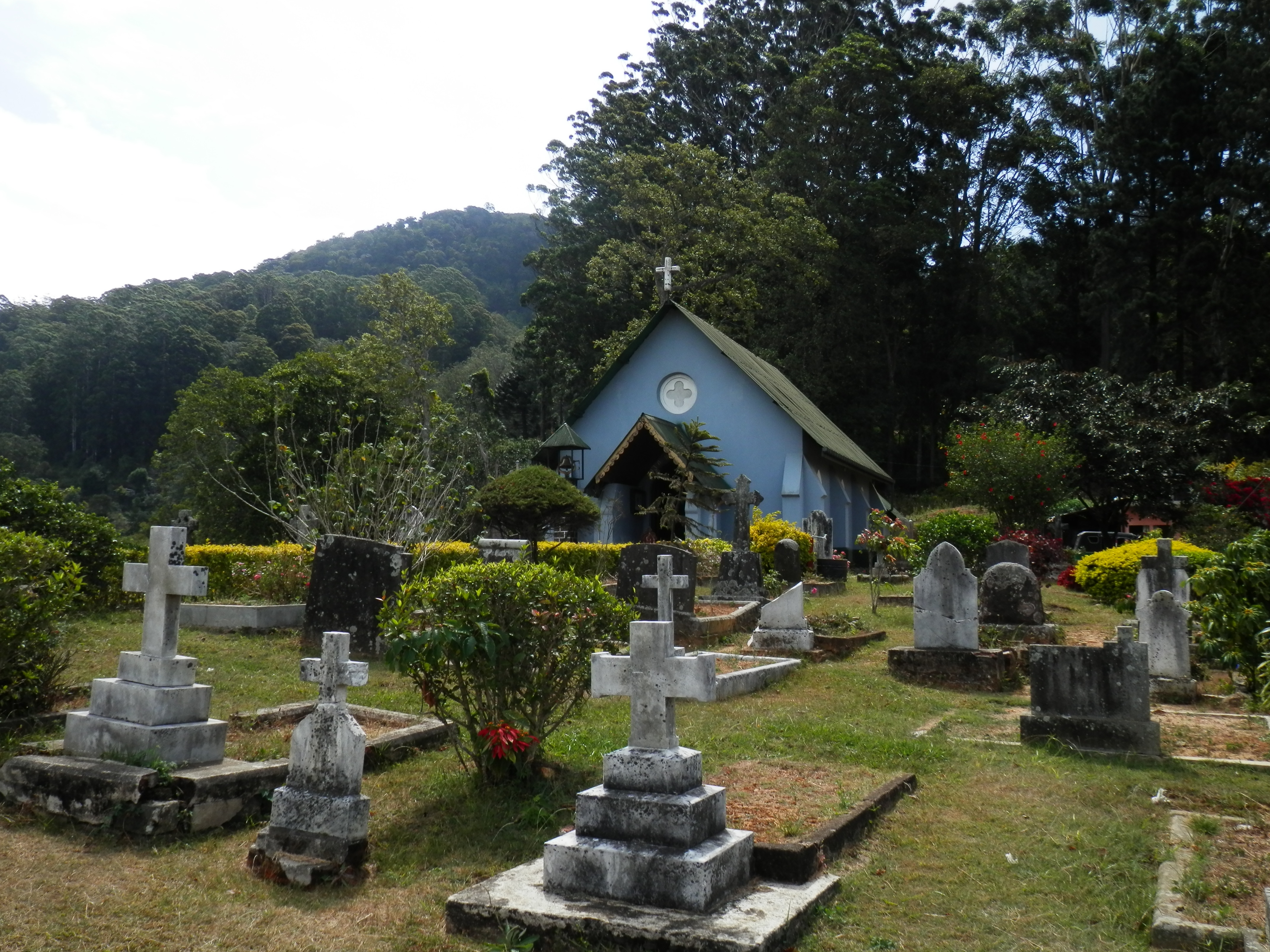
- St. Andrews Church, Haputale
- St. Andrew's Church, Haputale
- Location: Church Road, Nuwara Eliya, Sri Lanka
- Denomination: Anglican (Church of Ceylon)
- Website: St. Andrew's Church, Haputale

History
- Consecrated: 19 September 1869; 156 years ago

Architecture
- Functional status: Active
- Architectural type: Church
- Style: Neo-gothic
- Groundbreaking: 1869
- Completed: 1869

Administration
- Diocese: Diocese of Colombo
- Archdeaconry: Nuwara Eliya Archdeaconry

St. Andrew's Church (Sinhala: ශාන්ත අන්දෘ දේවස්ථානය, හපුතලේ) is an Anglican church in Haputale, Badulla District, Sri Lanka. This small Neo-gothic church is located on the A16 road (Beragala - Hali Ela road).

It is one of the oldest buildings in Haputale and one of the oldest European buildings in the district. The foundation stone was laid on 7 April 1869 by Lieutenant General Hodgson and it was consecrated for worship on 19 September 1869. It was built by James Andrews, who worked at Sherwood Estate, and Richard Wylie, from Pita Ratmale Estate. The first services were conducted by Rev. Joseph Barnett, co-pastor of Middlington.

The church's interior is small but well furnished. The pews and kneelers are upholstered with red velvet and leather and the ends of the pews are decorated with intricate woodcarvings. The altar is surrounded by stained glass windows imported from Scotland that depict the significant events in the life of Jesus. It has a marble baptismal font, imported from England, located at the entrance of the church.

Reverend Walter Stanley Senior's ashes are interred in the church's graveyard.

The church was declared a protected archaeological site in November 2002.
