= Wilfred A. Ratwatte =

Sri Lankan politician

Hon. Wilfred A. Ratwatte

Member of Parliament for Haputale
- In office 1952–1956
- Preceded by: J. A. Rambukpota
- Succeeded by: W. P. G. Ariyadasa

Personal details
- Party: United National Party
- Spouse: Panabokke Tikiri Kumarihamy
- Education: Trinity College, Kandy

Wilfred Abeyratne Ratwatte was a Ceylonese politician.

The son of Abeyratne Banda Ratwatte (Basnayake Nilame of Maha Vishnu Devale) and the nephew of Sir Cuda Ratwatte Adigar, the first Buddhist Member of the Executive Council, a nominated member of the Legislative Council, and the first elected Mayor of the Kandy. Ratwatte attended Trinity College, Kandy and married Panabokke Tikiri Kumarihamy, with whom he had one son.

At the 2nd parliamentary election, held between 24 May 1952 and 30 May 1952, Ratwatte was elected to the seat of Haputale, representing the United National Party. Ratwatte received 2,44 votes (48.75% of the total votes), 2,284 ahead of his nearest rival.

Ratwatte failed to retain his seat at the 3rd parliamentary election, held between 5 April 1956 and 10 April 1956, losing to the Sri Lanka Freedom Party candidate, W. P. G. Ariyadasa, by 3,352 votes.
