= K. D. Goonaratne =

Ceylonese teacher and politician (1903-?)

Kodituwakku Don Goonaratne (13 July 1903 – ?) was a Ceylonese school teacher and politician.

Goonaratne contested the first 1st parliamentary election held in 1947 in the seat of Alutnuwara. Alutnuwara was a rural constituency, where chena (elephant foot yam) was cultivated, with 70% Sinhalese and 20% Indian Tamils. He ran as an independent but lost to the Ceylon India Congress candidate, Desigar Ramanujam by 1,437 votes. He secured 22.5% of the total vote, as opposed to Ramanujam's 47%. He ran again at the 2nd parliamentary election held in May 1952 but lost to Ramanujan, who increased his majority to 51%, whilst Goonaratne only had 11.5% of the vote.

When Ramanujan died in March 1955 Goonaratne did not run in the subsequent by-election, held on 28 May, at which Edmund Bernard Dimbulane, from the United National Party was elected.

He did however run again at the 3rd parliamentary election held in April 1956, this time as the Sri Lanka Freedom Party candidate. He defeated the sitting member, Dimbulane, by 2,448 votes receiving 64% of the total votes, as opposed to Dimulane's 35%.

He served as the Parliamentary Secretary to the Minister of Health in 1959.
