= Idalgashinna =

Coordinates: 6°47′N 80°54′E

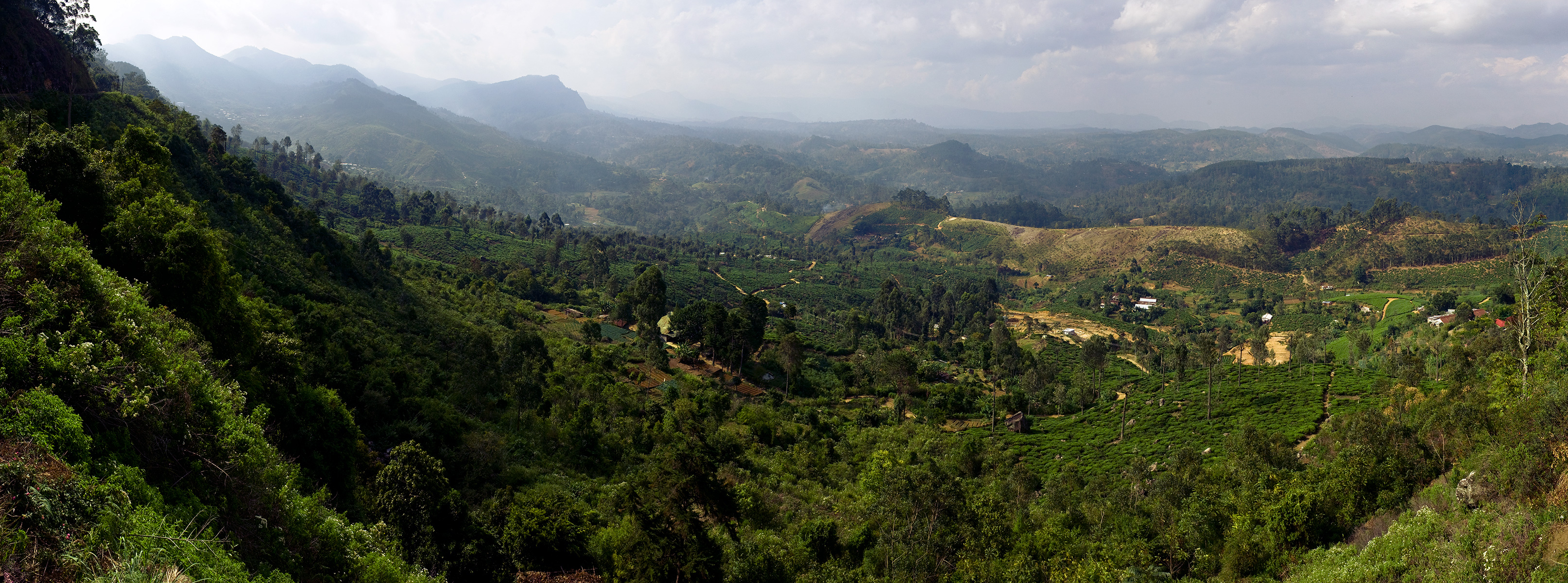
Idalgashinna in a valley in the Haputale-Namunukula range

Idalgashinna (Sinhala: ඉදල්ගස්හින්න, Tamil: இதல்கஸ்ஹின்ன) is a small village in the Badulla District, Uva Province, Sri Lanka. Situated at an elevation of about 1,615 metres (5,299 ft) above sea level, it is located in the Haputale-Namunukula mountain range. The area is home to the Idalgashinna Estate, with the closest large town being Haputale, about 9km south on the railway. Between the two locales lies the Thangamale Bird Sanctuary. Education in the area comes under the purview of the Welimada Divisional Secretariat, which administers the Idalgashinna Tamil Vidyalaya (Idalgashinna Tamil College), Beauvais Tamil Vidyalaya and the Ellethota Vidyalaya.

Idalgashinna was established as a tea estate in 1984, although the area had seen isolated periods of settlement prior to this. The Idalgashinna Pass is a prominent geological feature in the area; Idalgashinna was regarded as a key entrance to the upland country, with the Portuguese attempting to use the pass in their wars against the Kingdom of Kandy in the 16th century.
