= E. B. Dimbulane =

Ceylonese politician

Hon. E. B. Dimbulane

Member of Parliament for Alutnuwara
- In office 1955–1956
- Preceded by: J. A. Rambukpota
- Succeeded by: K. D. Goonaratne

Personal details
- Born: Edmund Bernard Dimbulane
- Party: United National Party

Edmund Bernard Dimbulane was a Ceylonese politician and a former member of the Parliament of Sri Lanka.

In March 1955, the sitting member for Alutnuwara electoral district, J. A. Rambukpota, died. At the subsequent by-election, held on 28 May 1955, Dimbulane ran as the United National Party candidate. He polled 5,921 votes (58% of the total vote) and 3,114 votes clear of his nearest rival from the Lanka Sama Samaja Party.

He contested the 3rd parliamentary election, held from 5 to 10 April 1956, but was unable to retain his seat, losing to the Sri Lanka Freedom Party candidate K. D. Goonaratne, by 2,448 votes.
