= W. S. Senior =

Rev. W. S. Senior
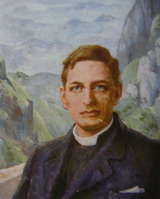
- Born: Walter Stanley Senior; 10 May 1876
- Died: 23 February 1938 (aged 61)
- Resting place: St. Andrew's Church, Haputale
- Education: Marlborough College, Oxford University
- Occupations: Poet, educator
- Notable work: The Song of Ceylon, Hymn for Lanka, College Hymn of Trinity College, Kandy
- Spouse: Ethel May Poole

Rev. Walter Stanley Senior (10 May 1876 – 23 February 1938) was an English scholar, poet and member of the Church Missionary Society. Popularly known as the "Bard of Lanka", his works are still widely read in the island nation. He was also vice principal of Trinity College, Kandy, Sri Lanka.

== Early life ==
Walter Stanley Senior was the son of Walter Senior, a clergyman. His uncle was Edward Senior, headmaster of Sheffield Royal Grammar School which he attended from 1888 to 1891. He continued his early education at Marlborough, a school to which he was deeply attached and about which he wrote both in prose and verse. From Marlborough, he won a scholarship at Balliol College, Oxford. He took a First Class in Classical Honour Moderations (Intermediate examination) and a Second Class in Greats (classics or philosophy). He was the author of a work titled Pisgah or The Choice, which won the triennial prize poem on a sacred subject in the University of Oxford, 1914.

== Trinity College – the early years ==
Senior came out to Sri Lanka (then Ceylon) in 1906 and served as vice-principal of Trinity for a decade. When the then principal of Trinity, A. G. Fraser, was looking for talent in the English Universities which he could enlist into service at Trinity College, Kandy, he came across Senior, who formed one of a brilliant set of men, including Dr. Kenneth Saunders from Emmanuel College, Cambridge, N. P. Campbell, a Balliol man, a notable scientist, and J. P. R. Gibson, later principal of Ridley Hall, Cambridge. In the absence of Fraser, Senior also deputised as acting principal for a short period.

Trinity emerged as a public school with a scholastic reputation with the appointment of Senior. His earliest students included two University Scholars, L. M. D. de Silva, KC, and J. L. C. Rodrigo, who succeeded him as a classical lecturer at the University College.

A little-known fact during his stay in Kandy was his role in the marriage of George E. de Silva, which was solemnised in 1909 at St. Paul's Church, Kandy. The marriage, to Agnes Nell, from a very conservative Dutch family, was opposed by many to the point that the vicar refused to marry them, and it was left to Senior to solemnise the marriage.

A portrait of Senior by David Paynter, also a Trinitian, hangs in the Trinity College Library.

== Other work in Sri Lanka ==
Senior assumed duties as Vicar of Christ Church, Galle Face, in 1916 and continued in this post until 1919. He was not only a scholar but also a preacher. He was one of the pioneer slum-workers and carried on a mission in Slave Island for many years.

Senior's interest in educational work prompted him to accept the post of the first registrar of the University College and lecturer in classics. He was also the personal tutor of James P. Obeysekere and lived with the family in Reid Avenue while teaching at University College.

== Later years and death ==
Having spent the greater part of his life in the service of Sri Lanka, his comparatively early death was attributed to the rigorous tropical conditions undermining a not very robust frame. He retired to England, and one of his greatest desires, namely, to see Ceylon and some of his numerous friends before his death, was gratified when he was able to spend a short holiday on the island two years before his death, in 1936.

Some of his decisions at the important crossroads of his life could only have been taken by one who never lacked the courage of his convictions. A career in government service with the prospect of a pension before him were no deterrents to the simple notion that he would like to live with his wife and children. But always there was at his heartstrings a tug towards the land of his adoption. In a letter to a friend, written a few months before his death, he said: "The idea has come to me that I should like my ashes, for I contemplate cremation rather than burial, to be interred in St. Andrew's Churchyard, Haputale." His gravestone at St Andrew's is a testament to his life, bearing the plain legend He Loved Ceylon preceded by the opening lines from his poem, Lanka from Pidurutalagala: Here I stand in spirit, as in body once I stood Long years ago, in love with all the land, This peerless land of beauty's plenitude. The pulpit of the Trinity College Chapel is dedicated to his name.

== Family ==
Senior married Ethel May Poole, daughter of Bishop Poole – the first Church of England Bishop in Japan – in 1907. He had two sons one of whom was a member of the African Civil Service, and two daughters.

== Writing ==
Senior was a classical scholar. His best known work is the epic, The Call of Lanka, which received generally positive feedback by others in Sri Lanka.

- Pisgah, or The Choice 1914 (Blackwell)
- Vita-magistra: Occasional verse 1937, reprinted 1983 (Colombo)

== Selected works ==
- ”The Call of Lanka”
- ”A Hymn for Ceylon”
- ”Farewell to Lanka”
- ”Goodbye”

== See also ==
- Trinity College, Kandy
