= Uva Province =

Province of Sri Lanka

Uva Province ඌව පළාත ஊவா மாகாணம்
- Province
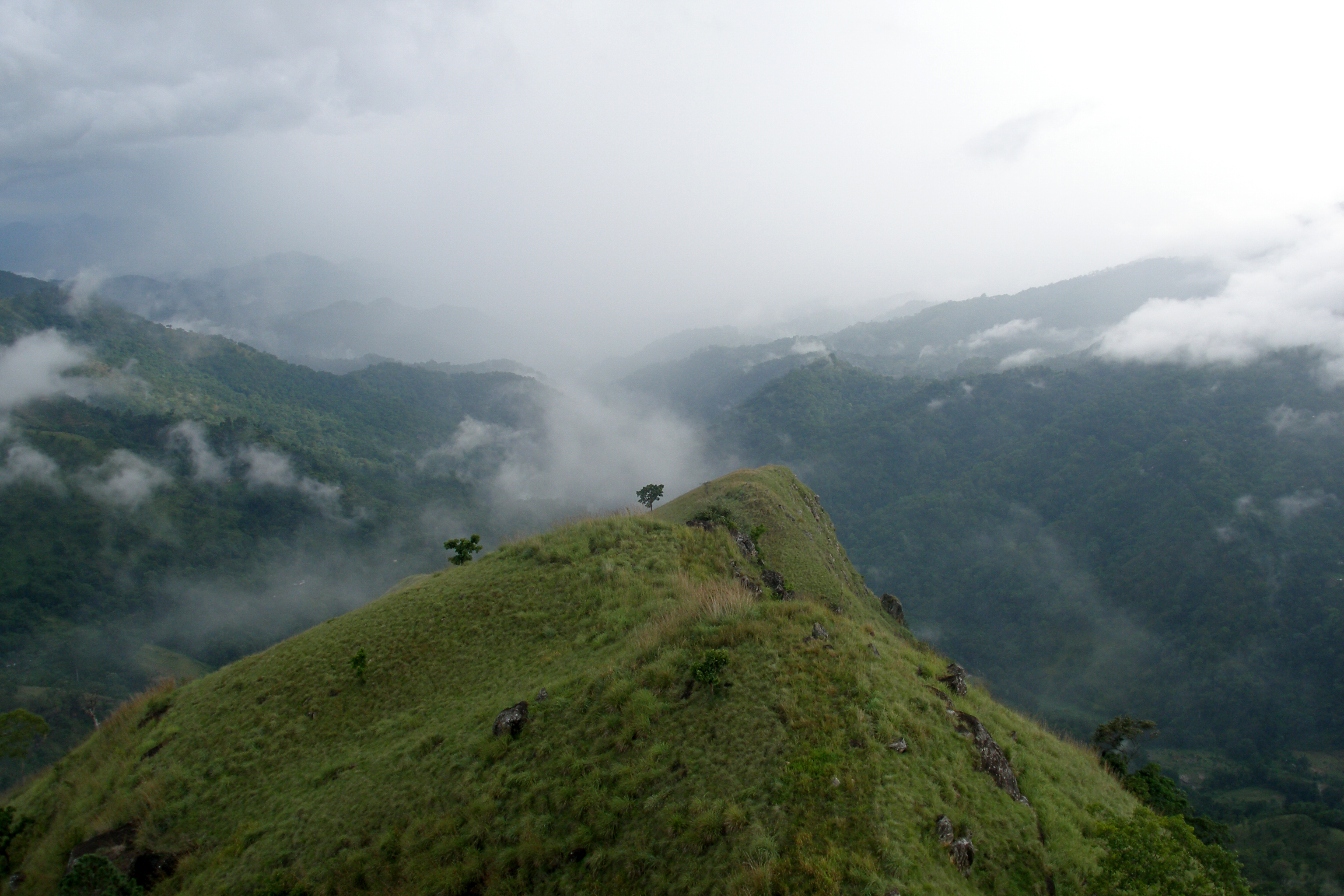
- View from Ella Gap

- Flag

- Location within Sri Lanka
- Coordinates: 6°35′24″N 81°01′48″E
- Country: Sri Lanka
- Created: 1886
- Admitted: 14 November 1987
- Capital: Badulla
- Largest City: Badulla
- Districts: List: Badulla; Monaragala

Government
  - Type: Provincial council
  - Body: Uva Provincial Council
  - Governor: Kapila Jayasekera

Area
  - Total: 8,628 km^{2} (3,331 sq mi)
  - Land: 8,273 km^{2} (3,194 sq mi)
  - Rank: 4th (12.92% of total area)

Population (2024 census)
  - Total: 1,399,892
  - Rank: 8th (6.3% of total pop.)
  - Density: 169.2/km^{2} (438.3/sq mi)

Gross Regional Product (2021)
  - Total: Rs. 922 billion
  - Rank: 7th (5.2% of total)
- Time zone: UTC+05:30 (Sri Lanka)
- ISO 3166 code: LK-8
- Vehicle registration: UP
- Official Languages: Sinhalese; Tamil
- Flower: Gurulu raaja (Rhynchostylis retusa)
- Website: www.up.gov.lk

The Uva Province (IPA: [uːʋə], Sinhala: ඌව පළාත, romanized: Ūva Paḷāta, Tamil: ஊவா மாகாணம், romanized: Ūvā Mākāṇam) is one of the nine provinces of Sri Lanka. The province has an area of 8,500 km^{2} and a population of 1,266,463, making it the 2nd least populated province. The provincial capital is Badulla.

Uva is bordered by the Eastern, Southern, Sabaragamuwa, and Central provinces. It is home to several tourist attractions, waterfalls and two national parks: Yala National Park and Gal Oya National Park.

== History ==
The names Hoowakannika (3rd century BC – 3rd century AD) and Hoowaratta (11th century AD) are recorded for a historical province, as is Ūva in the Kingdom of Kandy (16th to 19th century). Originally it reached down to the coast, until the British took control of the entire coastal region. Traditionally the toponym is believed to derive from a battle cry of Hoowa!, or possibly an onomatopoeic rendering of the mountain winds.

Uva's provincial history records an 1818 uprising (also known as the Third Kandyan War) against the British colonial government which had been controlling the formally independent Udarata (Sinhalese: Up-Country), of which Uva was a province. The uprising was led by Keppetipola Disawe, a rebel leader celebrated by the Sinhalese even today, who was sent initially by the British government to stop the uprising. The rebels managed to capture Matale and Kandy before Keppetipola fell ill and was captured and beheaded by the British. His skull was abnormal, as it was wider than usual, and was sent to Britain for analysis. It was returned to Sri Lanka after independence, and now rests in the Kandy Museum.

The rebellion, which soon developed into a guerrilla war of the kind the Kandyans had fought against European powers for centuries, was centred on the Kandyan nobility and their unhappiness with developments under British rule since 1815. However, it was the last uprising of its kind. In the Uva Province, a scorched earth policy was pursued, which included the killing of cattle and other livestock, the destruction of private property (including homes and stocks of salt) and the burning of rice paddies. In the rebellion, more than 10,000 Sinhalese were killed. In addition to the scorched earth policies, the colonial government also confiscated properties owned by insurgents. The Crown annexed the Kingdom of Kandy to British Ceylon in 1817.

== Geography ==
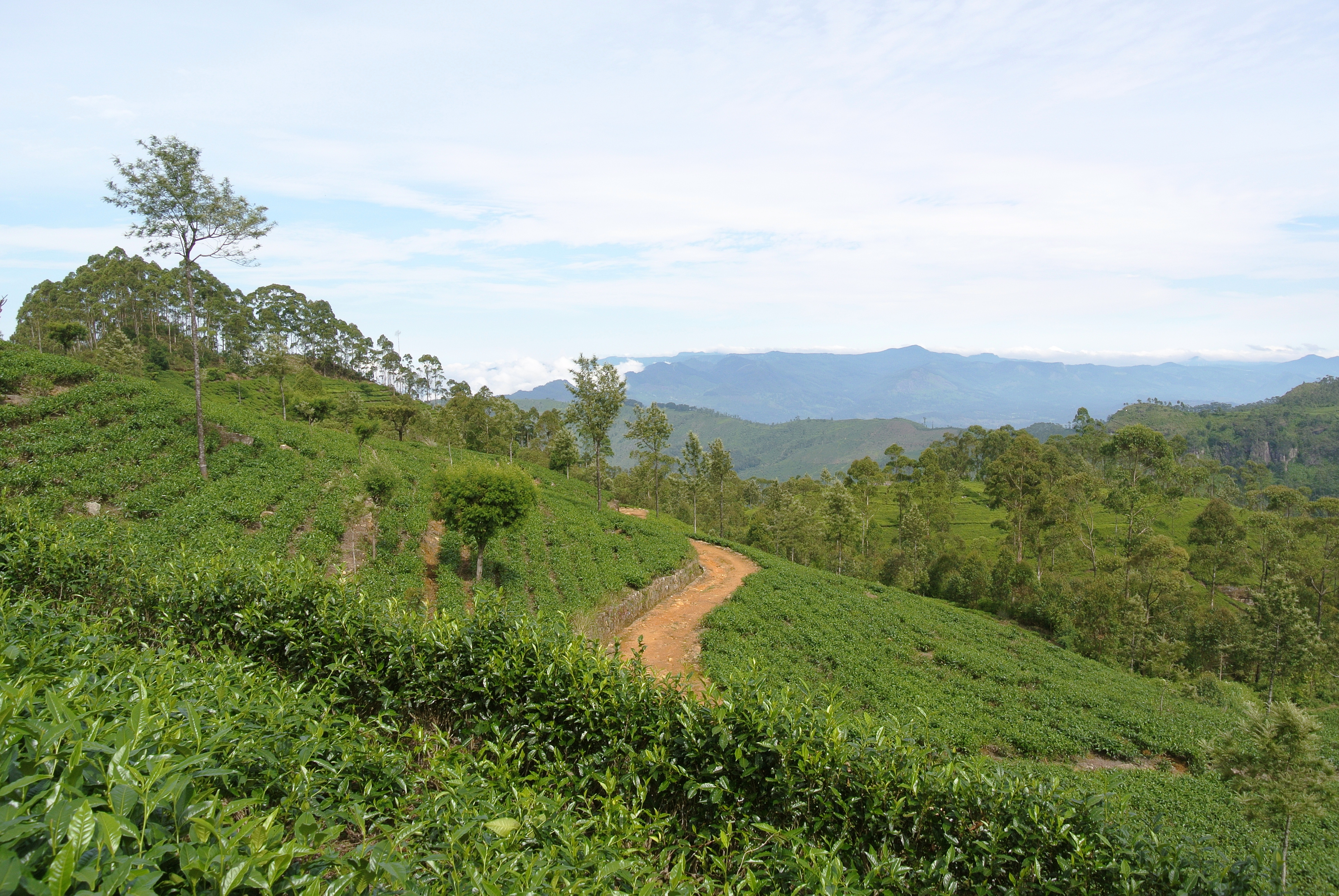
A tea plantation in Haputale

The Uva province has an area of 8,500 km^{2} and a population of 1,259,880.

Uva is home to several major tourist attractions, like the waterfalls of Dunhinda falls, Diyaluma Falls, and Rawana Falls, and the Yala National Park (lying partly in the Southern and Eastern Provinces) and Gal Oya National Park (lying partly in the Eastern Province).

The Gal Oya hills and the central mountains are the main uplands, while the Mahaweli (Sinhalese: great-sandy) and Menik (Sinhalese: gemstone) rivers and the huge Senanayake Samudraya and Maduru Oya Reservoirs are the major waterways of the province.

=== Mountains ===
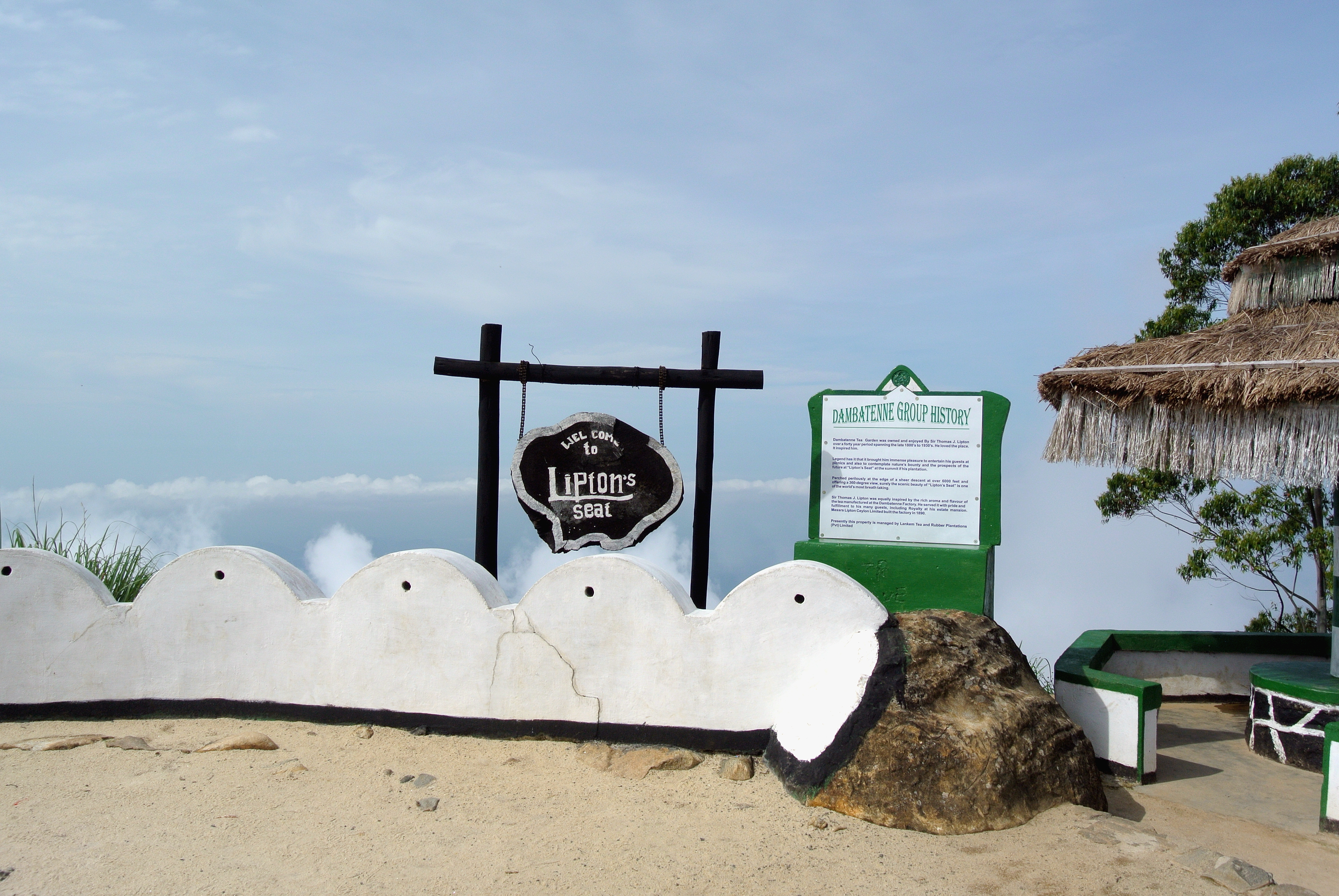
Lipton's seat

Uva's symbolic mountain is Namunukula, which stands tallest among the mountain range surrounding Badulla. The highest mountain in the Uva Province is Totapolakanda, which lies on the border with the Nuwara Eliya District. There are views of the Welimada basin, Katharagama and Hambantota from Namunukula peak on a clear day.

The Haputale-Beragala gap gives a view of the Southern and Sabaragamuwa provinces on a clear day.

== Administrative divisions ==
=== Districts ===
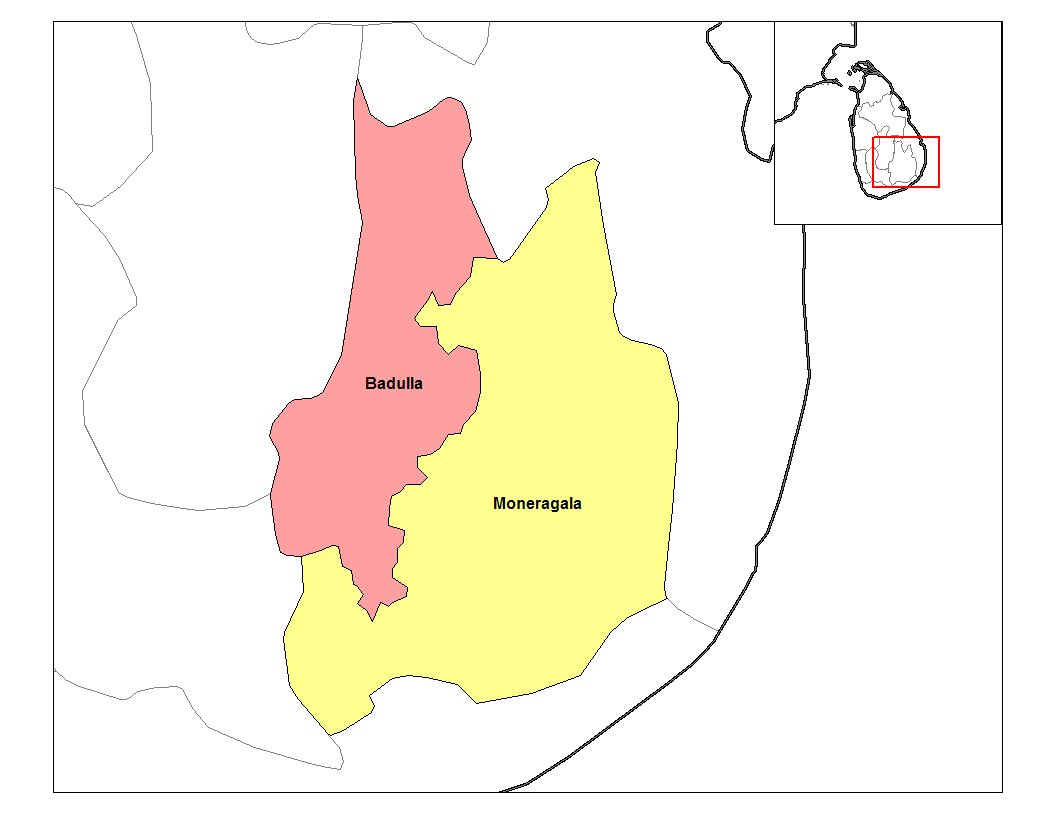
Districts of Uva

Uva is divided into 2 districts:

Administrative Divisions of Uva Province
District	Capital	Area (km^{2})	Population
Badulla District	Badulla	2,861	815,405
Monaragala District	Monaragala	5,639	451,058

=== Divisional secretariats ===
There are 26 divisional secretariats in the Uva Province. There are 15 in the Badulla District and 11 in the Moneragala District.

=== Major cities and towns ===
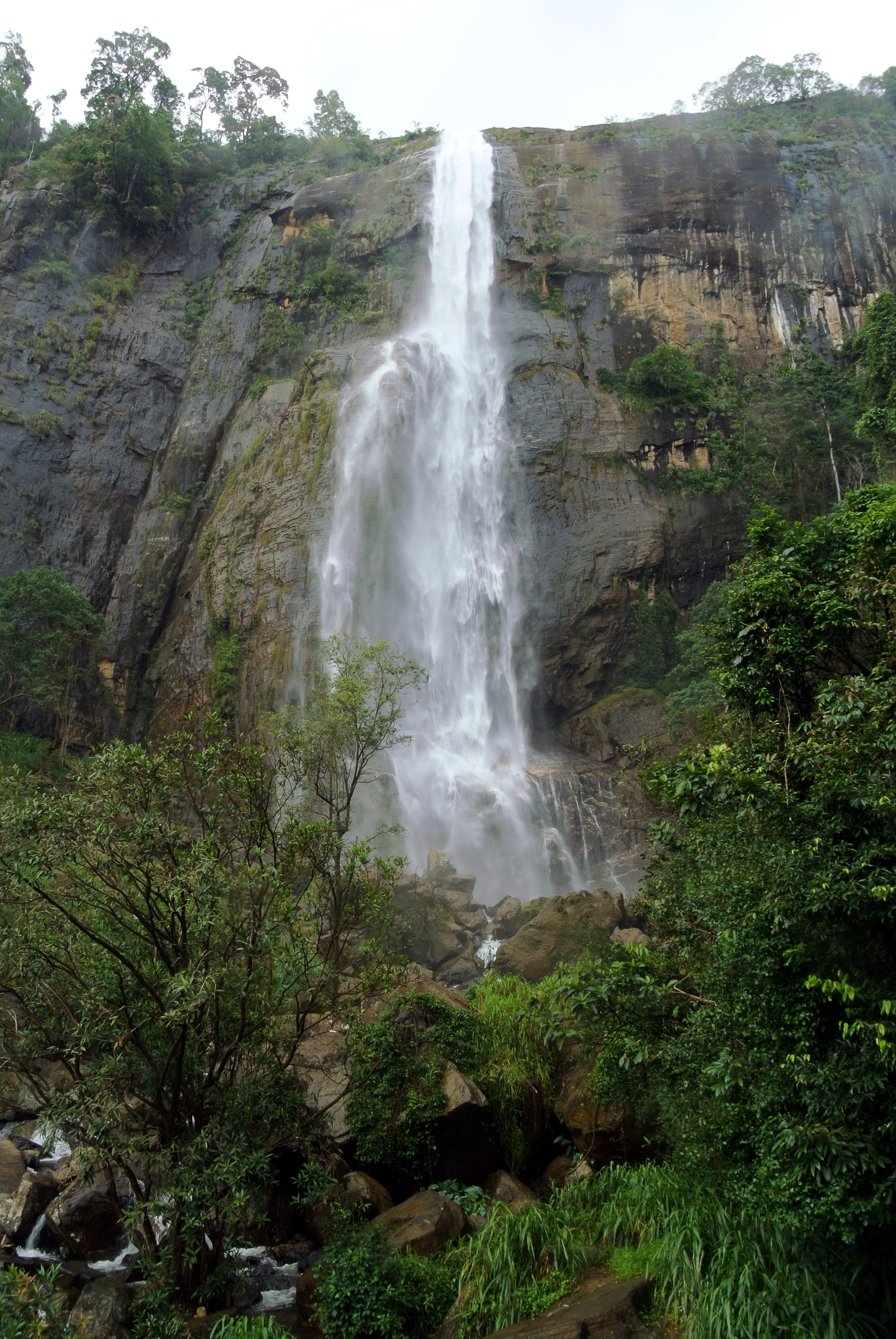
Diyaluma Falls

- Badulla
- Bandarawela
- Haputale
- Monaragala
- Welimada
- Wellawaya
- Ella

== Demographics ==
=== Ethnic groups ===
Ethnicity in Uva Province (2024)
1. Sinhala (81.4%)
2. Hill Tamils (6.92%)
3. Sri Lankan Tamils (6.90%)
4. Sri Lankan Moors (4.59%)
5. Others (0.16%)

The Sinhalese are the majority ethnic group of the Uva province. Additionally, there are sizeable minority populations of Indian Tamils, Moors and Sri Lankan Tamils, mostly in Badulla district.

=== Religion ===
Religion in Uva Province (2024)
1. Buddhism (81.1%)
2. Hinduism (12.9%)
3. Islam (4.70%)
4. Catholicism (0.76%)
5. Other Christianity (0.46%)
6. Others (0.02%)

== Tourism ==
The Uva Province is renowned for its diverse landscapes, rich biodiversity and cultural heritage, making it a popular destination for domestic and international tourists alike. The province boasts numerous waterfalls, forest reserves and stunning hill country vistas. Notable waterfalls include Dunhinda Falls, Diyaluma Falls, Bambarakanda Falls, Ravana Falls and Bomburu Ella. The highlands around Haputale, Bandarawela and Ella offer panoramic views, which are often accessed via hiking trails that wind through tea plantations and along misty mountain slopes. Hortons Plains National Park, which borders Uva Province, is famous for its 'World's End' viewpoint and its unique montane ecosystems. The Gal Oya and Yala National Parks, which are partly located in Uva Province, are also important wildlife conservation areas that attract visitors interested in safaris and birdwatching. Uva has several sites of historical and religious significance. One of the oldest Buddhist temples is the Muthiyangana Raja Maha Viharaya in Badulla, which dates back to the reign of King Devanampiyatissa (307–267 BC) and visited by Sri Gauthama Buddha.

The Dowa Rock Temple, close to Bandarawela, contains ancient Buddha statues and rock paintings. Evidence of colonial-era architecture can be seen in towns such as Bandarawela and Badulla. Visitors can also explore local temples, caves and sites of historical significance, such as those associated with the Uva–Wellassa Uprising of 1817–1818. Tea plantations are a key feature of tourism in the Uva region. Guided tours of the plantations and factories allow visitors to observe the cultivation and processing of tea, as well as sampling it. Hiking is also a popular activity, with routes such as those to Little Adam’s Peak, Ella Rock, Nine Arch Bridge and the trails around Haputale offering both short and long trekking options. Wildlife safaris are offered in parks such as Yala and Gal Oya, where you can see elephants, numerous bird species and other endemic fauna.

Major towns such as Badulla, Bandarawela, Ella and Haputale serve as hubs for visitors. Hill country roads connect these towns and link to the southern and eastern lowlands. The region is accessible by road, and train with public and private transport services available. Many tourist sites are located at elevations ranging from about 600 metres to over 1,400 metres above sea level, contributing to cool climates in the hill country.

== See also ==
- List of settlements in Uva Province
- Provinces of Sri Lanka
- Districts of Sri Lanka
