= Ravana Ella =

Ravana Ella රාවණා ඇල්ල (බඹරගල ඇල්ල)
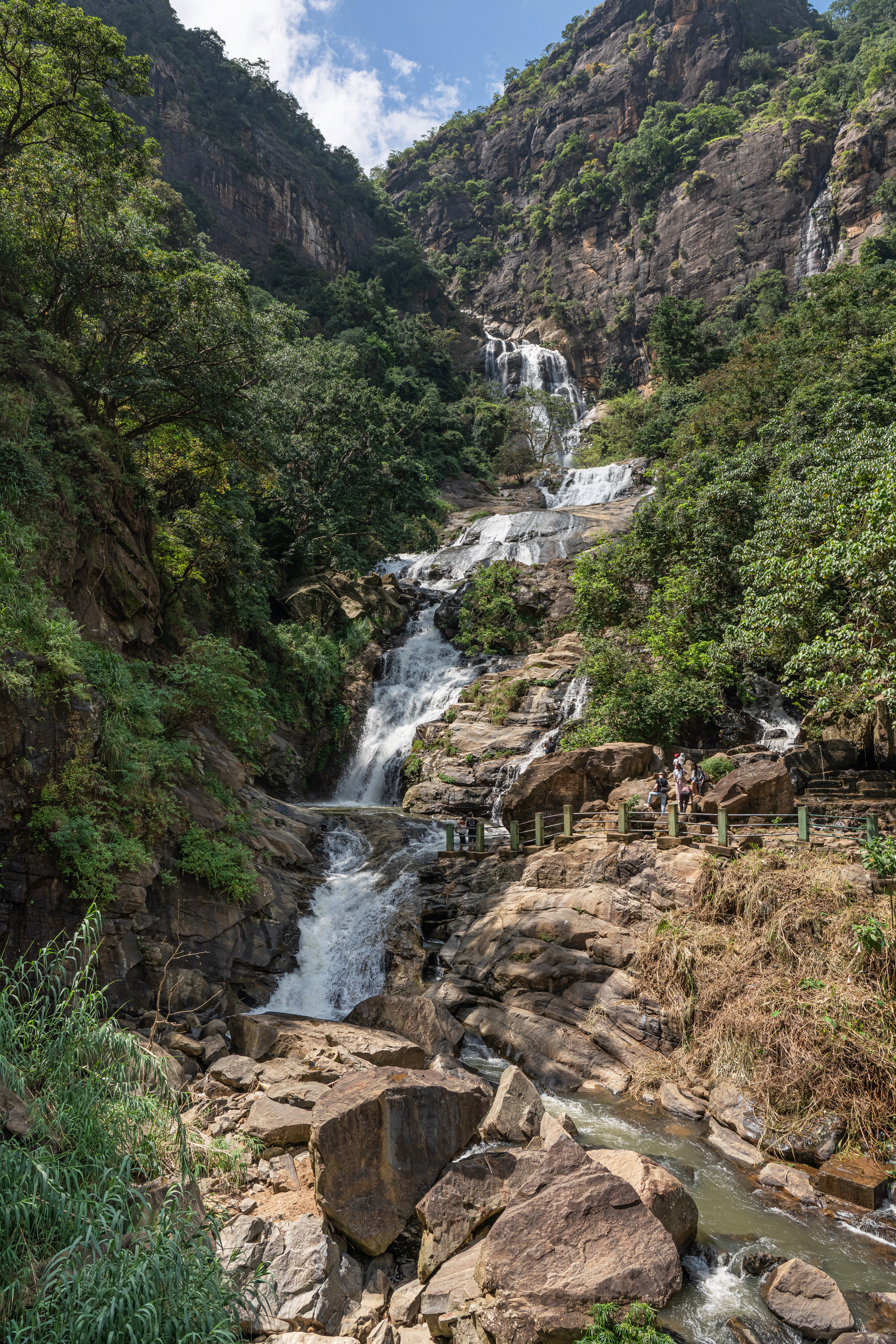

- Location within Sri Lanka
- Location: Ella, Sri Lanka
- Coordinates: 6°50′27″N 81°3′16″E
- Type: Cascade
- Elevation: 1,050 m (3,445 ft)
- Total height: 25 m (82 ft)
- Watercourse: A tributary of Kirindi Oya.

Ravana Ella, also known as Ravama Falls, or Bambaragala Falls (Sinhala: බඹරගල ඇල්ල, romanized: Bambaragala Ella) is a popular sightseeing attraction in Uva province of Sri Lanka. It currently ranks as one of the widest falls in the country.

== Description ==
This waterfall measures approximately 25 m (82 ft) in height and cascades from an oval-shaped concave rock outcrop. During the local wet season, the waterfall turns into what is said to resemble an areca flower with withering petals. But this is not the case in the dry season, when the flow of water reduces dramatically. The falls form part of the Ravana Ella Wildlife Sanctuary, and are located 6 km (3.7 mi) from the local railway station at Ella.

== Legend ==
The falls are named after the mythical king Ravana, who is connected to the famous Indian epic, the Ramayana. According to legend, it is said that Ravana (who was the king of Lanka at the time) had kidnapped princess Sita, and had hidden her in the caves behind this waterfall, now simply known as the Ravana Ella Cave. Ravana wanted to exact revenge on Rama (husband of Sita) and his brother Laxmana for slicing off the nose of his sister. At the time, the cave was surrounded by thick forests in the midst of the wilderness. It is also believed that Rama's queen bathed in a pool that accumulated the water falling from this waterfall. They believed that Ravana has played the Ravanahatha over here.

The Ramayana and Ravana are mythological in nature and are not considered factual and archaeologically verified history.

== Ravana Ella cave ==
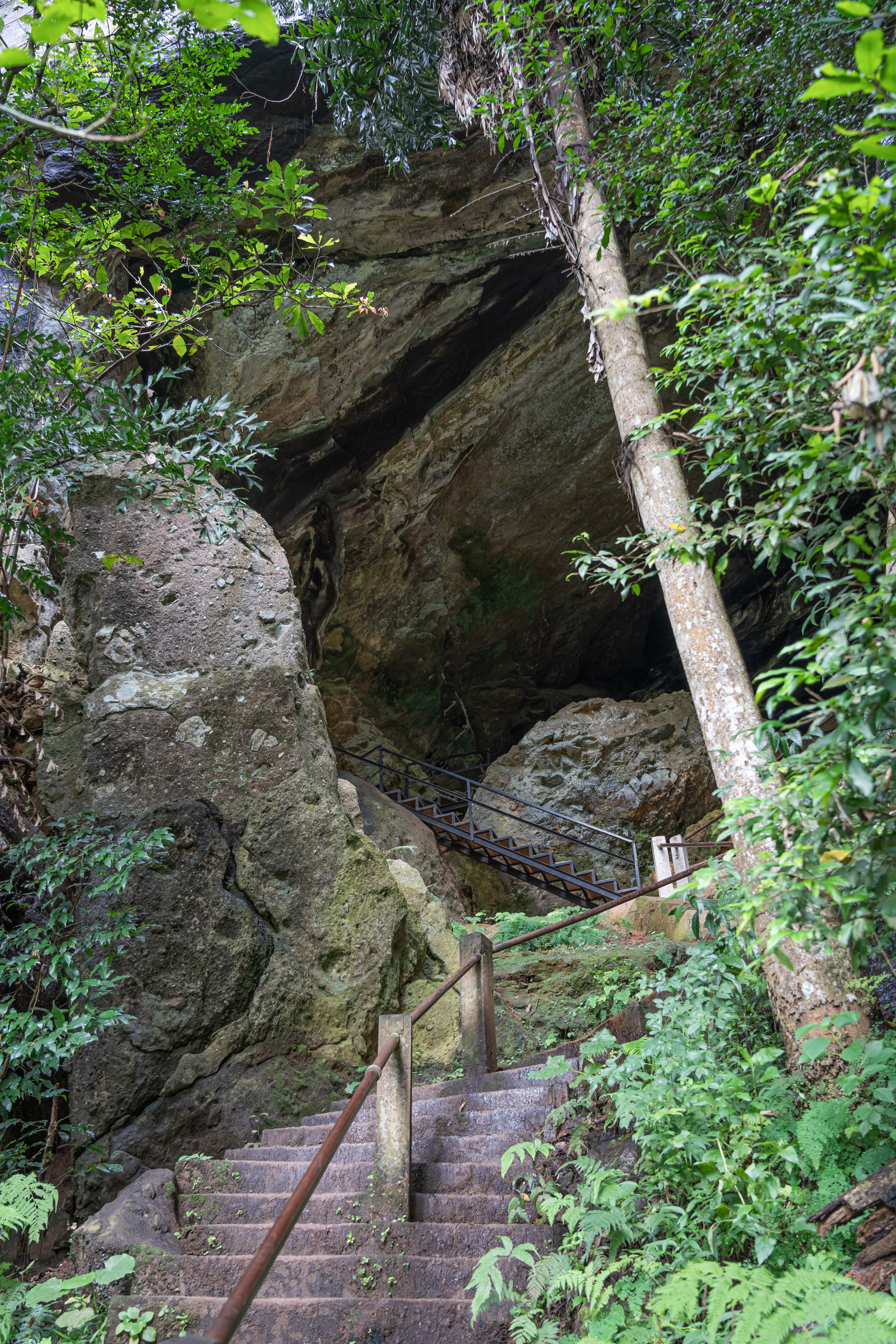
Stairs to the cave

The Ravana Ella Cave lies at 1,370 m (4,490 ft) above sea level on the foundation of a cliff. The cave is a popular local tourist attraction, located 11 km (7 mi) away from Bandarawela. Excavations undertaken in the cave uncovered evidence of human habitation dating back to 25,000 years.

== See also ==
- List of waterfalls
- List of waterfalls in Sri Lanka
