= Dhowa rock temple =

Buddhist temple in Sri Lanka

- දෝව රජ මහා විහාරය
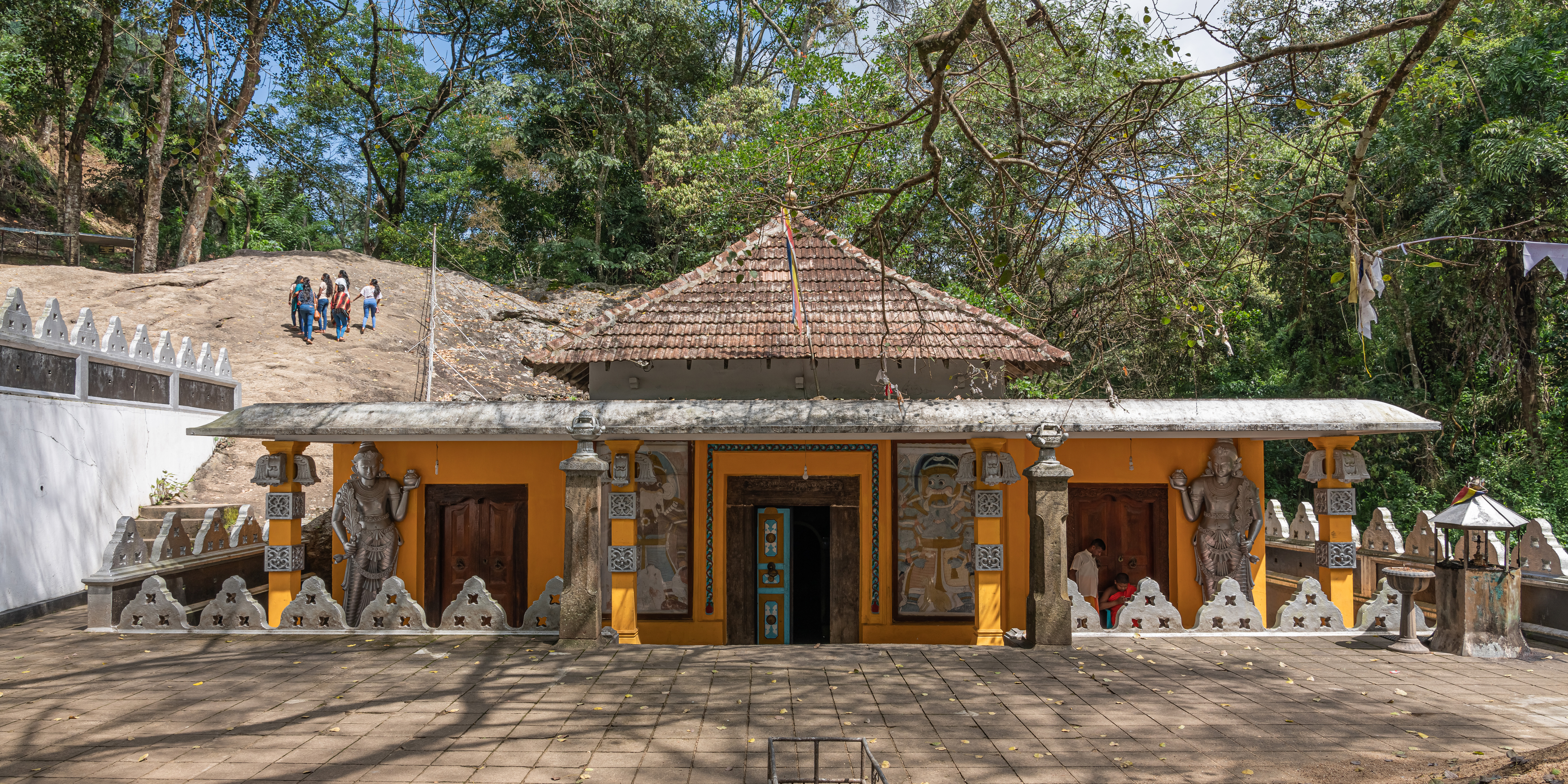
- Exterior of the temple

- Location within Sri Lanka

Religion
- Affiliation: Buddhism
- District: Badulla
- Province: Uva Province

Location
- Location: Dhowa, Bandarawela, Sri Lanka
- Coordinates: 6°51′20.46″N 81°1′15.52″E

Architecture
- Type: Buddhist Temple
- Archaeological Protected Monument of Sri Lanka
- Designated: 1996.11.01

Dhowa Rock Temple or Dowa Raja Maha Viharaya (Sinhala: දෝව රජ මහා විහාරය) is a heritage listed rock temple in Sri Lanka, located in the central mountains of the Uva Province. It is adjacent to Dhowa, a small village situated on the Badulla-Bandarawela main road (approximately 7.5 km (4.7 mi) north of Bandarawela). The temple is 210 km (130 mi) east of Colombo and 120 km (75 mi) south of Kandy.

== History ==
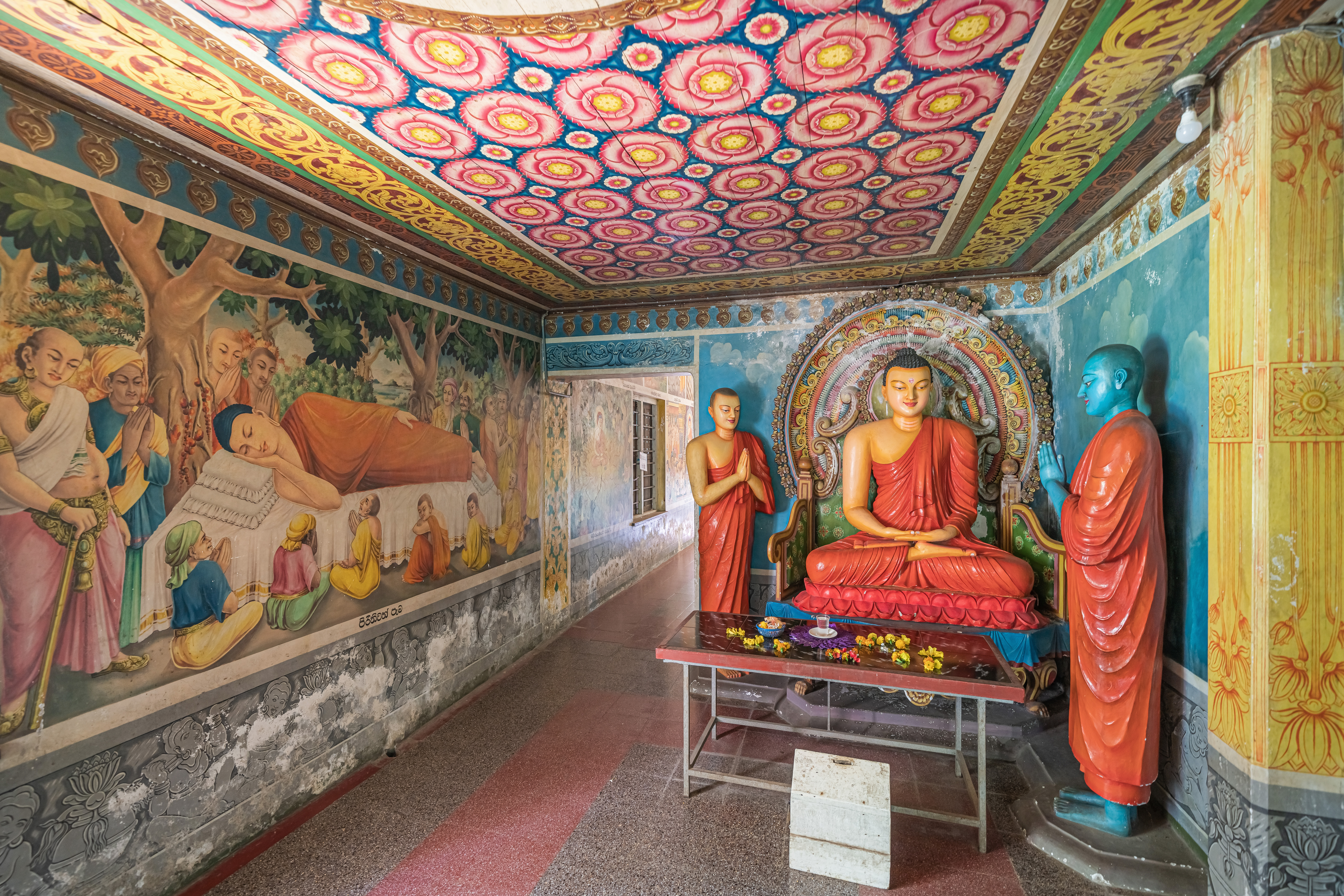
The shrine room inside the temple

The temple is believed to have been constructed by King Valagamba in the first century BC and is one of many temples built by the king while taking refuge in Uva Province after an army from South India invaded the Anuradhapura Kingdom. The temple dates back over 2000 years.

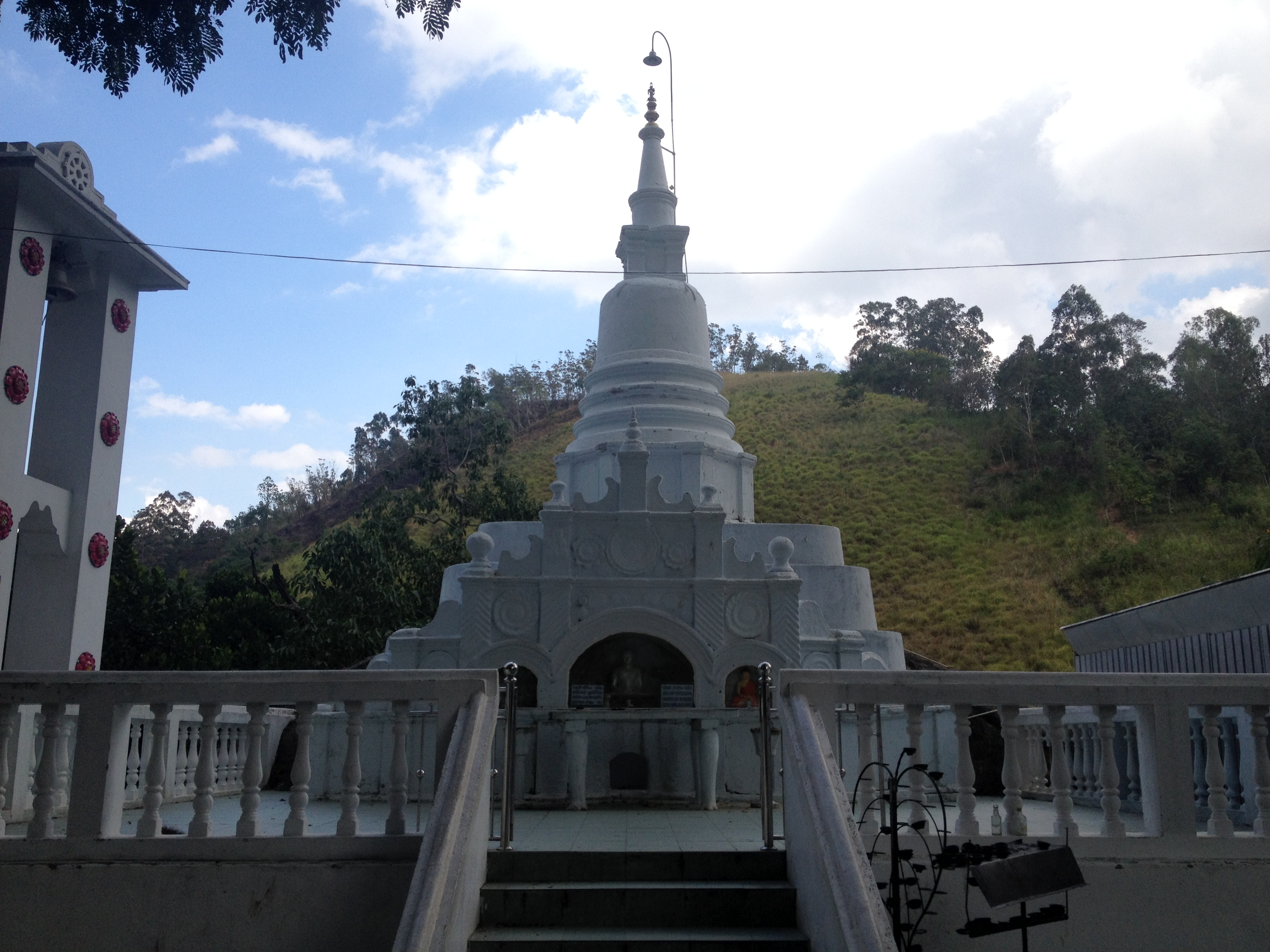
Stupa of Dowa Raja Maha Vihara

On 1 November 1996 was formally recognised by the government as an archaeological protected monument. The designation was declared under the government Gazette number 948.

== Attractions ==
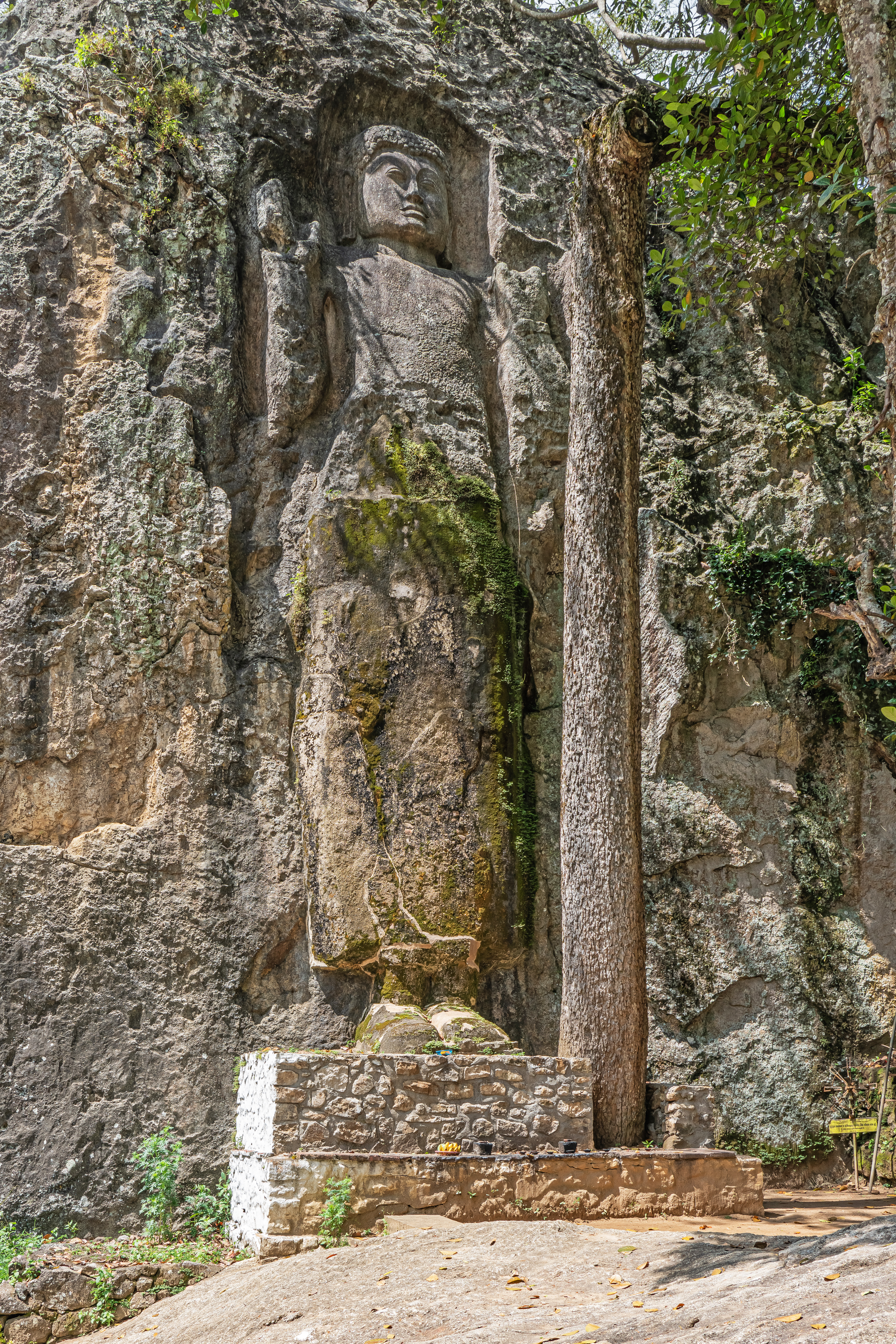
The unfinished Buddha image at Dhowa Raja Maha Vihara

The temple is famous for its large, approximately 11 m (36 ft) high unfinished Buddha image, which is carved into the vertical granite rockface. The image is an example of Mahayana sculpture.

=== Paintings ===
The image house, which is located inside the cave contains numerous colourful murals and painting of Buddha. The entrance to the image house is flanked by two guardian statues, one with an elephant in its mouth and the other with a bull in its mouth. They are reported to be, two Rakshasa leaders, Watuka and Kuvera.

== See also ==
- Ancient constructions of Sri Lanka
