= Beragala =

Coordinates: 6.763985°N 80.914925°E

- Town
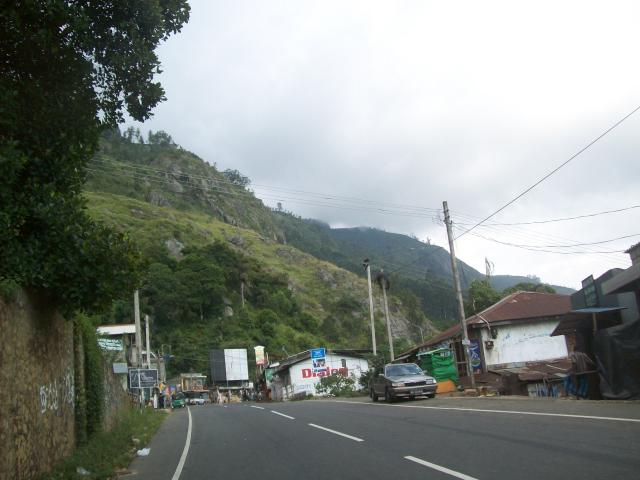
- Interactive map of Beragala
- Country: Sri Lanka
- Province: Uva
- District: Badulla
- Time zone: UTC+5:30 (Sri Lanka Standard Time Zone)

Beragala is a small town in Sri Lanka. It is located in Badulla District of Uva Province, Sri Lanka. It is located 183 km (114 mi) away from Colombo along the A4 Highway. The area is known for its natural environment, as well as for landslides.

== Attractions ==
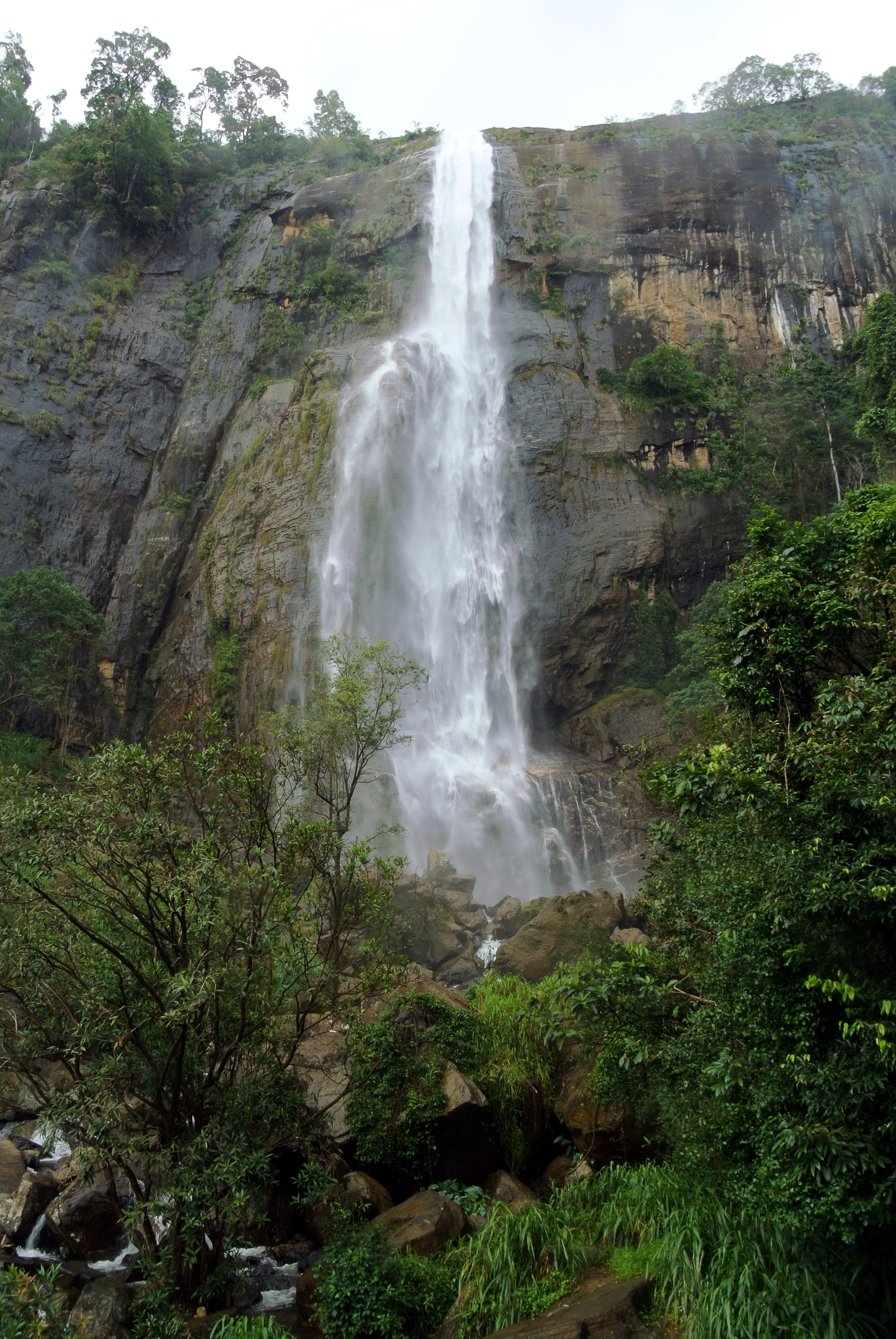
Diyaluma Falls

- Diyaluma Falls Koslanda
- Bambarakanda Falls
- Koslanda Falls
- Thangamale Sanctuary

== Transport ==
- A4 Highway, Colombo-Ratnapua-Balangoda-Beragala-Koslanda-Wellawaya-Pottuvil-Batticaloa (Route 99)
- A16 Road, Beragala-Hali-ela

== See also ==
- Towns in Uva
