= Desigar Ramanujam =

Politician (1907–1968)

Hon. Desigar Ramanujam

Member of the Parliament of Sri Lanka
- In office 1947–1952
- Preceded by: seat created
- Succeeded by: Justin Arthur Rambukpota
- Constituency: Alutnuwara

Personal details
- Born: July 17, 1907 Ramanathapuram, India
- Died: June 4, 1968 (aged 60)
- Party: Ceylon Indian Congress
- Profession: journalist, trade unionist

Desigar Ramanujam (17 July 1907 – 4 June 1968) was a Ceylonese trade unionist and politician.

Desigar Ramanujam was born in Ramanathapuram, India on 17 July 1907. Upon completing his higher studies, he commenced a career in journalism. In the late 1920s, Ramanujam, an accomplished writer, came to Sri Lanka to join the editorial staff of Tamil newspaper Desa Bakthan.

In 1934, he joined the teaching staff at Dharmaraja College in Kandy. He went on to form an association, Bose Sangam, to safeguard the rights of the Indian workers. The association's membership encompassed the villages of Mahaiyawa and Asgiriya. This association was subsequently dissolved following the formation of the Ceylon Indian Congress in 1950, of which Ramanujam was a founding member.

He was elected to the Kandy Municipal Council in 1943, representing the Asgiriya ward. In 1946, he became the first person of recent Indian origin to be appointed the Deputy Mayor of Kandy.

Ramanujam was elected at the 1st parliamentary election, held between 23 August 1947 and 20 September 1947, representing the Ceylon India Congress in the Alutnuwara electorate, securing 46.6% of the total vote, 1,437 votes ahead of his nearest rival.

Ramanujam was one of seven CIC members elected to parliament in 1947.

In 1961, Prime Minister Sirimavo Bandaranaike offered Ramanujam an appointed seat in Parliament. Still, he declined it in favour of the President of the Ceylon Workers Congress, Savumiamoorthy Thondaman.

In 1962, the International Confederation of Free Trade Unions (ICFTU) invited him to join their organisation, where he was given the task of organising the sugar plantation workers trade union movement in Mauritius. He was subsequently sent to Ethiopia to establish trade unions there. In 1965, the ICFTU appointed Ramanujam as its Special Representative in Singapore and later as the organization's Regional Director in South East Asia.

In June 1968, the ICFTU appointed Ramanujam the Director of the Asian Regional Office, based in India. However, he died suddenly on 4 June 1968, at the age of 60, before he could take up that posting.
