= Nine Arch Bridge =

Colonial railway bridge in Sri Lanka

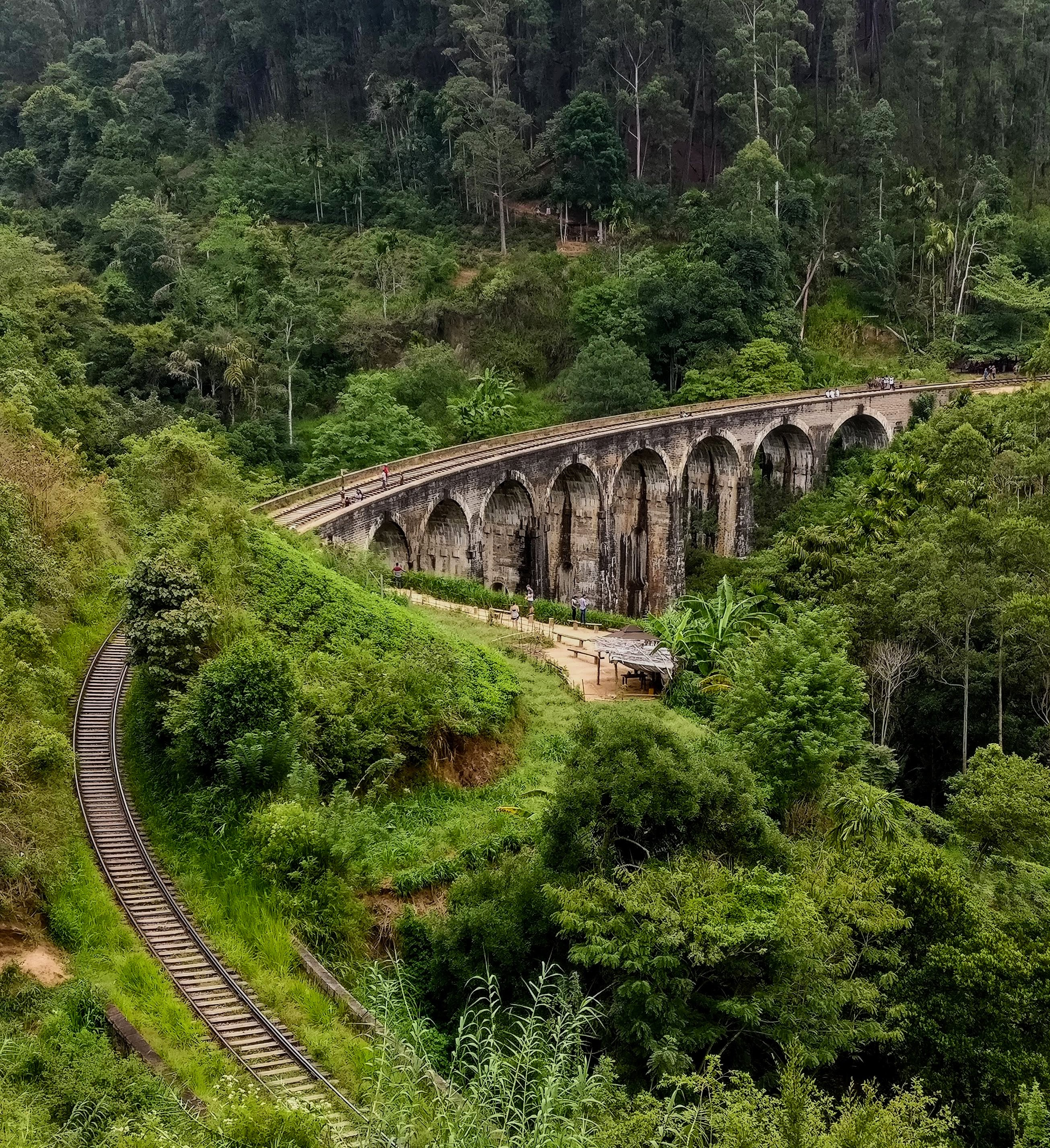
- Nine Arch Bridge in Ella
- Coordinates: 6.876667°N 81.061111°E
- Other name: "The Bridge in the Sky"
- Owner: Sri Lanka Railways
- Heritage status: Archaeological Protected Monument

Characteristics
- Material: Stones, Bricks and Cement
- Total length: 91 m (300 ft)
- Width: 7.6 m (25 ft)
- Height: 24 m (80 ft)
- No. of spans: 9

Rail characteristics
- No. of tracks: 1
- Track gauge: 5 ft 6 in
- Electrified: No

History
- Constructed by: Harold Cuthbert Marwood
- Construction end: 1919

Location
- Interactive map of Nine Arch Bridge

The Nine Arch Bridge (Sinhala: ආරුක්කු නමයේ පාලම; Tamil: ஒன்பது வளைவுகள் பாலம்) also called the Bridge in the Sky, is a viaduct bridge in Sri Lanka and one of the best examples of colonial-era railway construction in the country.

The bridge was designed to accommodate a challenging nine-degree curve and steep gradient. Built entirely by local labor under British supervision, the construction faced significant logistical challenges, including difficult terrain and material transport. Completed in 1919, the bridge used concrete cornice blocks for arch support and locally produced sand-cement blocks for facing.

== Location ==
It is located in Demodara, between Ella and Demodara railway stations.

== History ==
The work had been carried by Harold Cuthbert Marwood as Engineer in charge of that section of the railway, under the approval of the Chief Construction Engineer, Railway Extensions, M. Cole Bowen.

The chief designer and project manager of the 'Upcountry Railway Line of Ceylon' project was D. J. Wimalasurendra, a distinguished Ceylonese engineer and inventor. The designer of the viaduct was Harold Cuthbert Marwood of Railway Construction Department of Ceylon Government Railway. The 1923 report "Construction of a Concrete Railway Viaduct in Ceylon", published by the Engineering Association of Ceylon, has details of all the records including the plans and drawings.

Folklore generally attributed the construction of the bridge to a local Ceylonese builder, P. K. Appuhami, in consultation with British engineers. There is no documented evidence to support the involvement of Appuhami in the bridge's construction, but the folklore remains a part of the local heritage.

At the time of construction, which coincided with the commencement of World War I, rumours were that the steel assigned for the bridge were reallocated to British war related projects, and as a result, work came to a standstill, leading the locals to build the bridge with stone bricks and cement, but without steel, except of course for the rails and pins securing them.

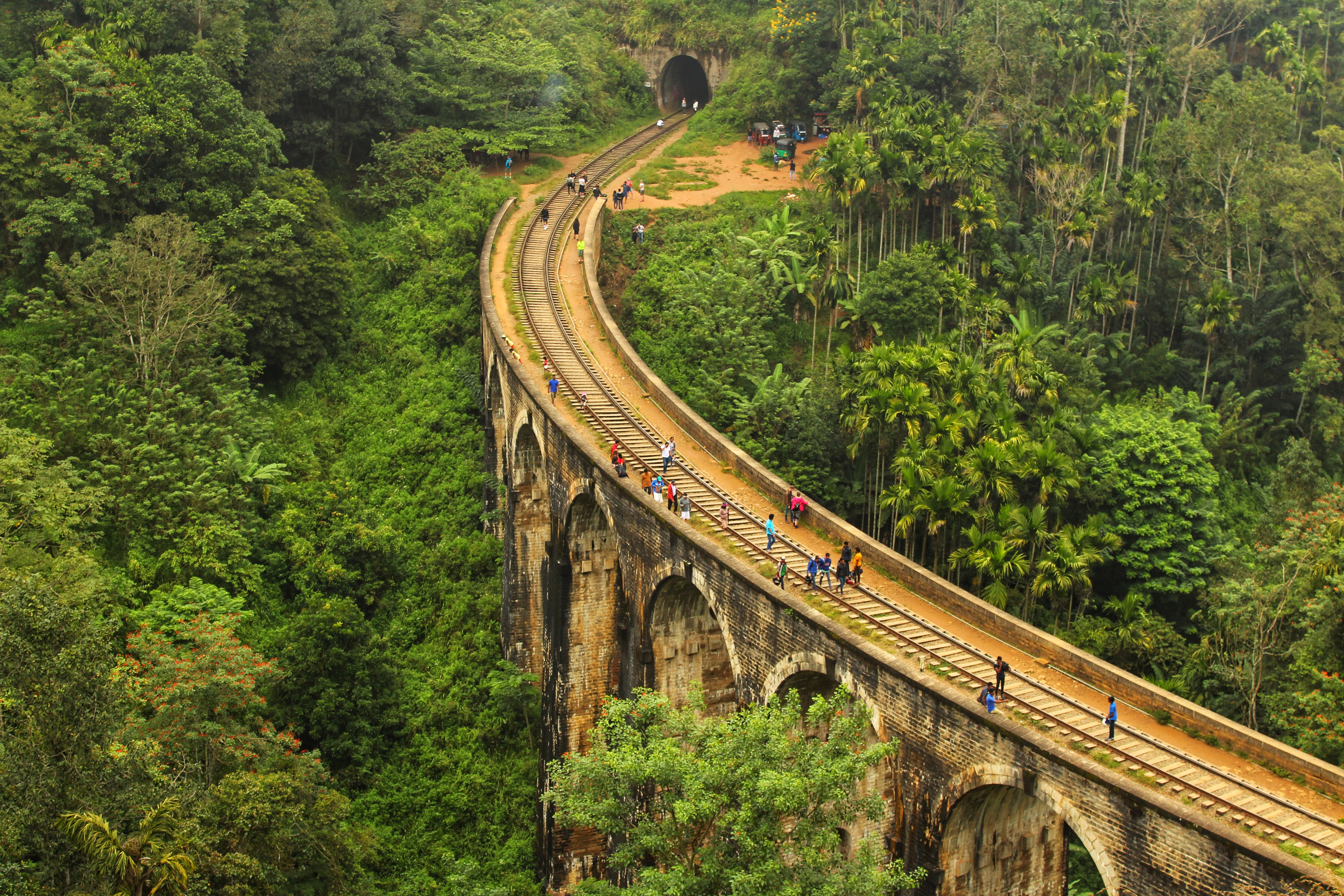
A panoramic view of the Nine Arch Bridge

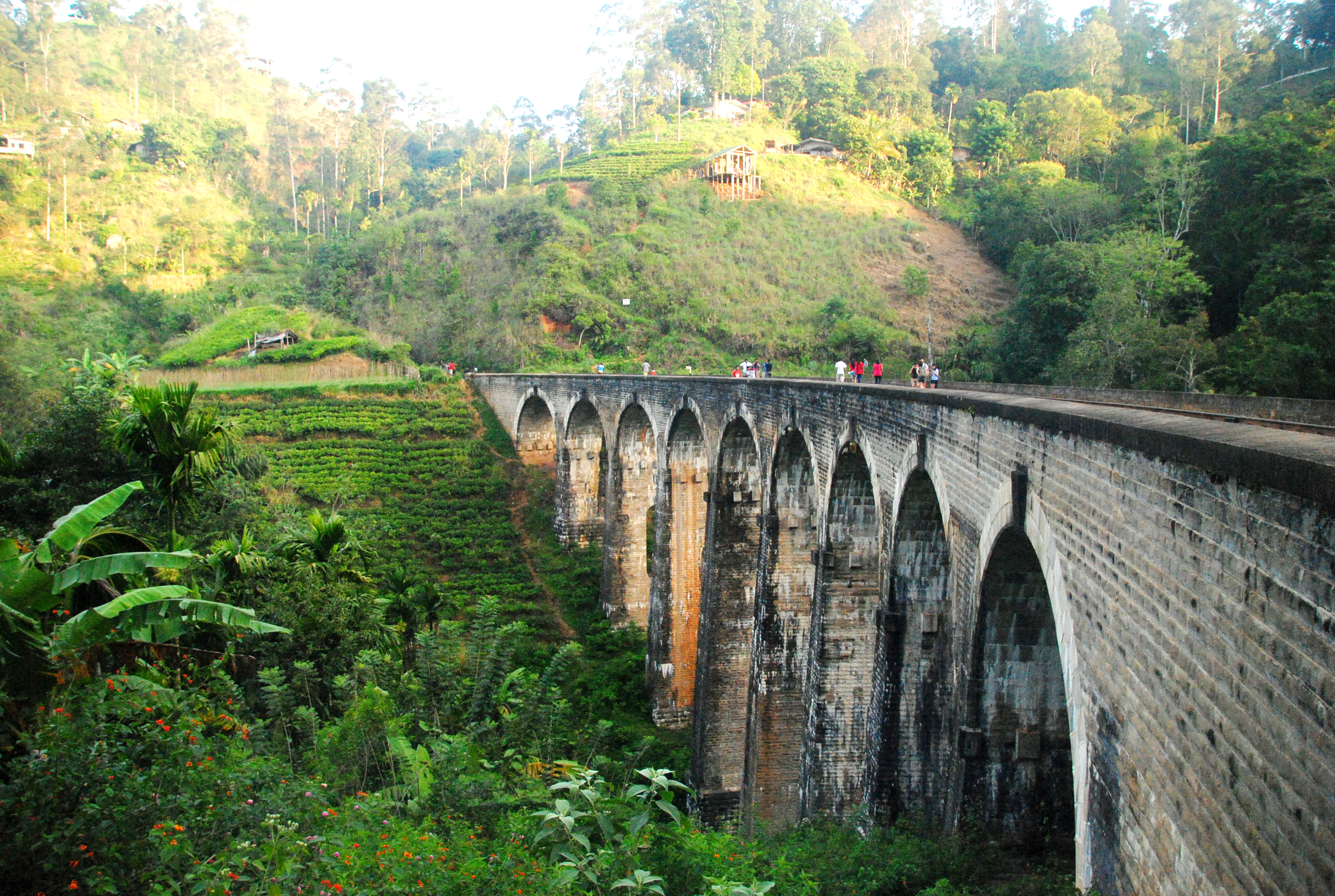
Nine Arch Bridge, Sri Lanka in 2017

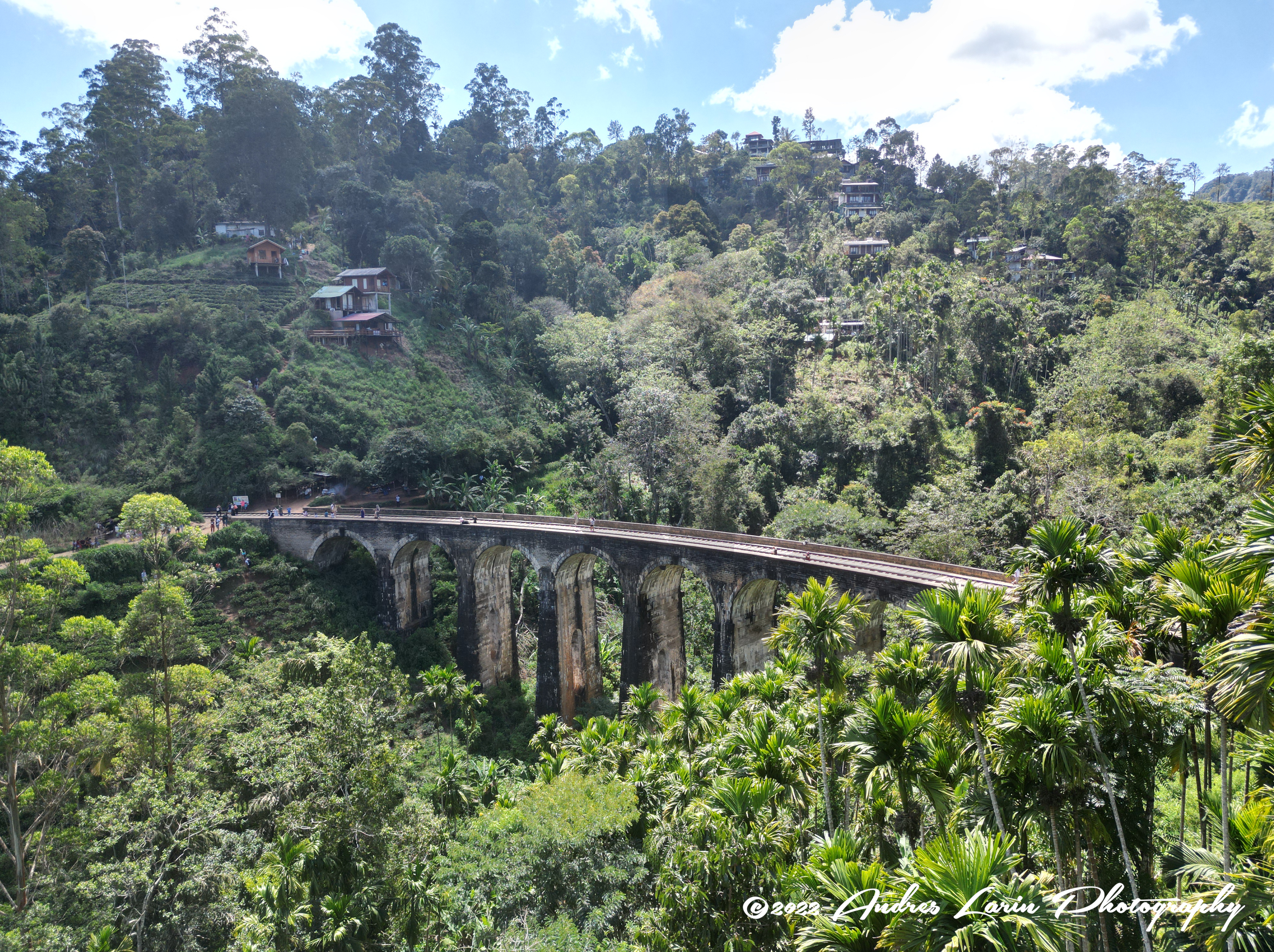
Drone shot of the Nine Arch Bridge
