= J. A. Rambukpota =

Ceylonese politician (1891–1955)

Hon. Justin Arthur Rambukpota

Member of Parliament for Haputale
- In office 1947–1952
- Preceded by: seat created
- Succeeded by: Wilfred A. Ratwatte

Member of Parliament for Alutnuwara
- In office 1952–1955
- Preceded by: D. Ramanujam
- Succeeded by: E. B. Dimbulane

Personal details
- Born: 1 January 1891
- Died: 3 March 1955 (aged 64)
- Education: Uva College, Trinity College, Kandy, Government School of Agriculture, Gannoruwa Peradeniya

Seneviratne Mudiyanselage Justin Arthur Rambukpota (1 January 1891 – 3 March 1955) was a Ceylonese politician.

Rambukpota's older brother, George Charles (1894 – ?), was a proctor of the Supreme Court and in 1931 was elected unopposed as the member of the State Council of Ceylon for Bibile.

He received his education at Uva College, Trinity College, Kandy and the Government School of Agriculture at Gannoruwa Peradeniya, where he was one of the first batch of students qualifying as an Agricultural Instructor. Rambukpota officiated as a member of the Agricultural Board and was the chairman of the Badulla District Paddy Growers Association. By 1919 he was officiating as the Rate Mahatmaya of Wellawassa and Wellawaya.

In March 1944 Rambukpota ran for a seat on the State Council but was defeated by S. A. Peeris, he ran again in October but was defeated by W. Dahanayake.

At the 1st parliamentary election, held on 16 September 1947, Rambukpota contested the Haputale electorate, as the United National Party candidate. He narrowly won by 371 votes, with the other three Tamil candidates equally sharing the electorate's predominantly Tamil votes.

Rambukpota went on to contest the seat of Alutnuwara at the 2nd parliamentary election held between 24 May 1952 and 30 May 1952, where he polled 50.94% of the total vote, 2,780 votes ahead of his nearest rival.

Rambukpota died whilst still in office on 3 March 1955.
