= Alutnuwara Town =

Coordinates: 7°19′N 80°59′E

- Town
- Interactive map of Alutnuwara Town
- Country: Sri Lanka
- Province: Central Province
- District: Kandy District
- Time zone: UTC+5:30 (Sri Lanka Standard Time)

Alutnuwara Town is a town in Sri Lanka. It is located within Central Province's Kandy District.

== See also ==
- List of towns in Central Province, Sri Lanka
