= Kirindi Oya =

River in Sri Lanka

Kirindi Oya Karinda Nadee
- Kirindi Oya
- Native name: කිරිඳි ඔය (Sinhala)

Physical characteristics
- Source: Bandarawela
- Mouth: Bundala
  - coordinates: 06°11′39″N 81°17′34″E
- Length: 117 km (73 mi)

Kirindi Oya is a river in Sri Lanka. Starting in Bandarawela, it flows for 117 km (73 mi) down to Bundala.

== See also ==
- Ravana Falls
- List of rivers of Sri Lanka
