= W. P. G. Ariyadasa =

Sri Lankan politician (born 1918)

Weligama Polwatta Galappathige Ariyadasa (born 29 August 1918) was a Ceylonese politician. He was a Minister of Local Government and Member of Parliament from 1956 to 1977.

Ariyadasa first contested the 1952 general election from the Haputale electorate, but came third. Contesting as the primary candidate of the Sri Lanka Freedom Party from the Haputale electorate he won the 1956 general election to the House of Representatives. He was re-elected from Haputale in the March 1960 general election, 1960 July general election and the 1970 general election.
