= Bambarakanda Falls =

Waterfall in Sri Lanka and the tallest waterfall in Sri Lanka

- Bambarakele Falls
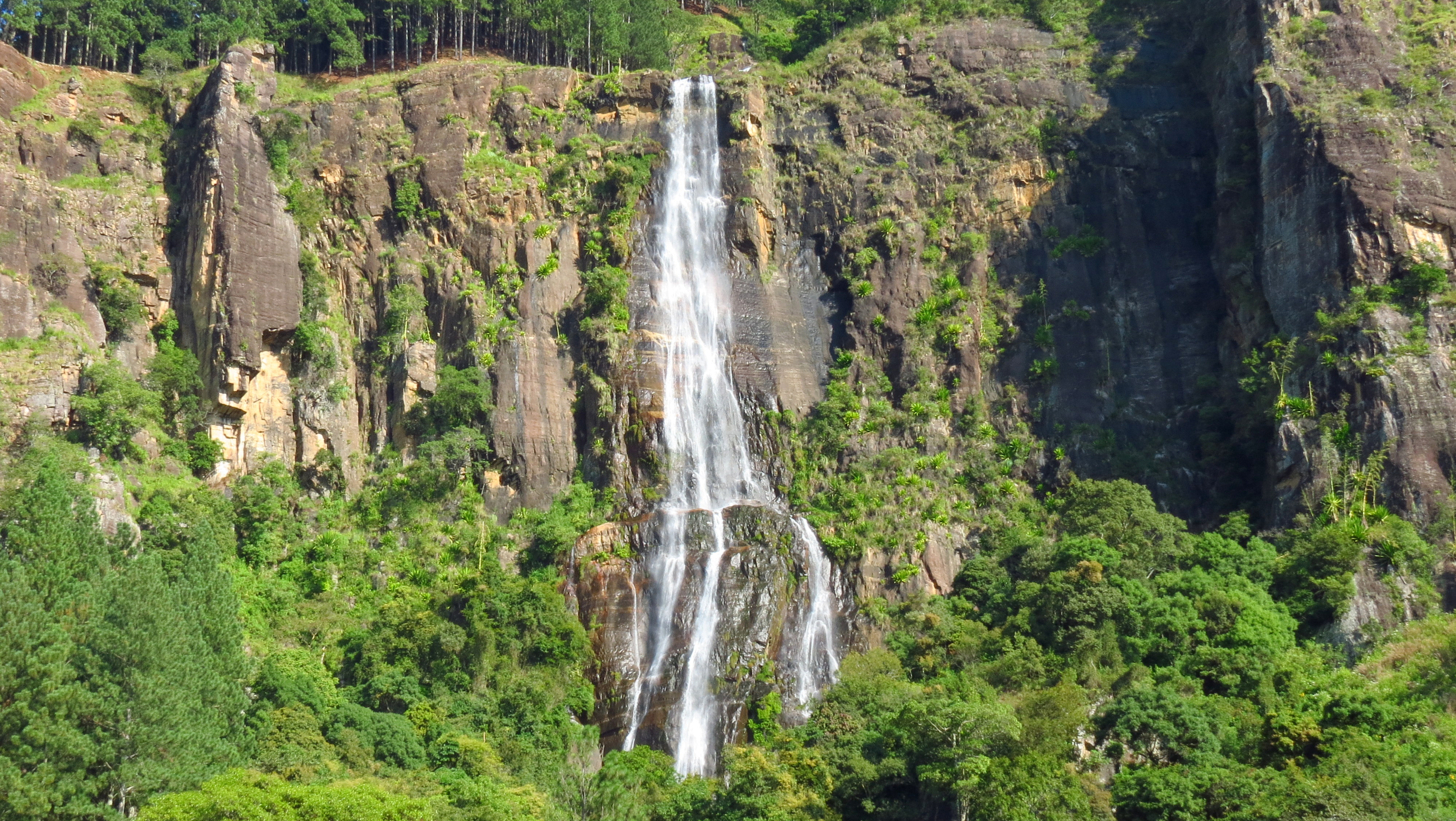
- Interactive map of Bambarakanda Falls
- Location: Kalupahana, Sri Lanka
- Coordinates: 6°46′24″N 80°49′52″E
- Type: Horsetail
- Elevation: ≈1,100 m (3,600 ft)
- Total height: 263 m (863 ft)
- Number of drops: 1
- Watercourse: Kuda Oya, a tributary of Walawe River
- World height ranking: 461st

Bambarakanda Falls (also known as Bambarakele Falls) is the tallest waterfall in Sri Lanka. With a height of 263 m (863 ft), it ranks as the 461st highest waterfall in the world. Situated in Kalupahana in the Badulla District, this waterfall is 5 km (3.1 mi) away from the A4 Highway. The waterfall was formed by Kuda Oya, which is a tributary of the Walawe River. The Bambarakanda Falls can be found in a forest of pine trees.

== See also ==
- List of waterfalls
- List of waterfalls in Sri Lanka
