= Diyaluma Falls =

Waterfall in Sri Lanka

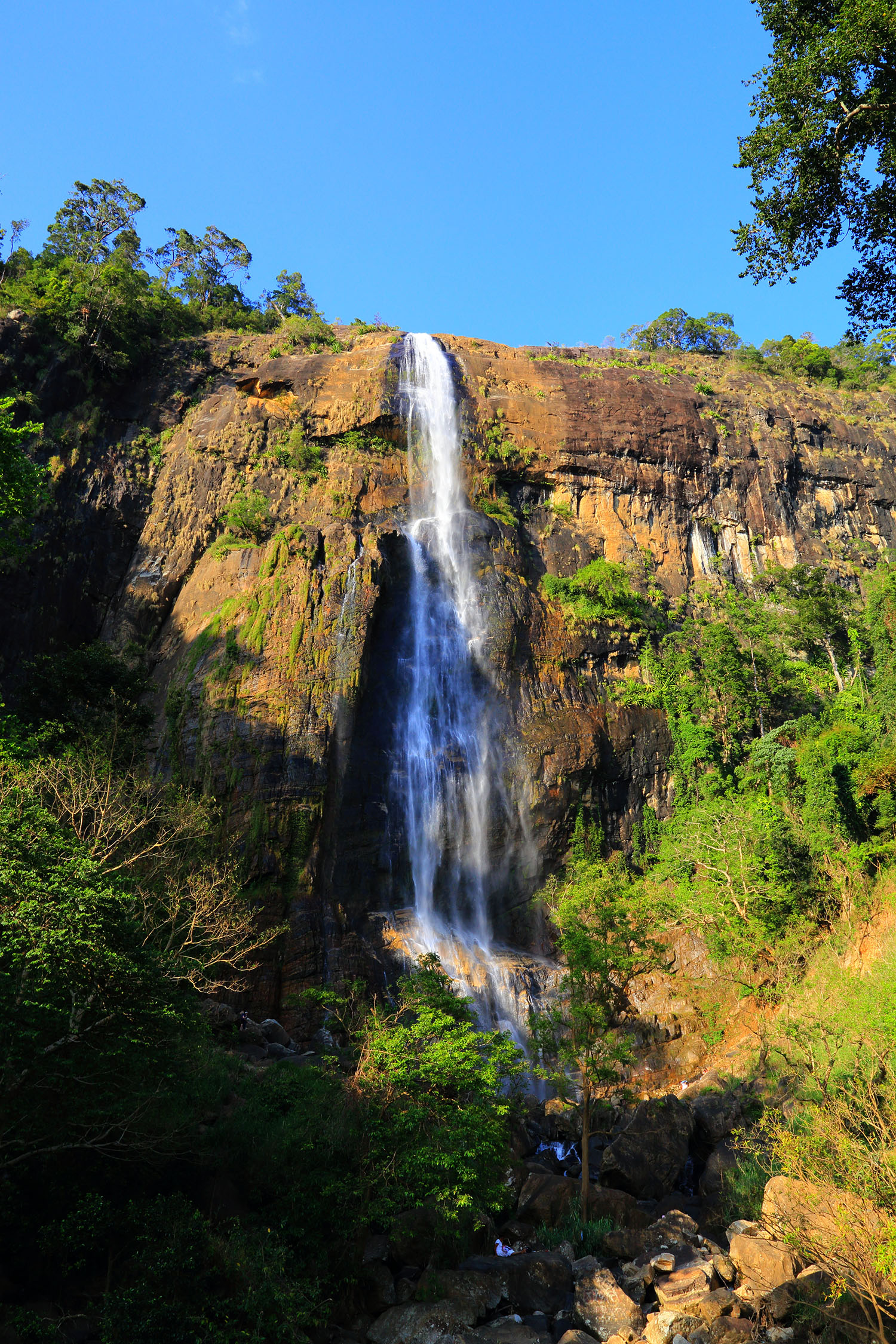
- Diyaluma Falls
- Interactive map of Diyaluma Falls
- Location: Koslanda, Sri Lanka
- Coordinates: 6.733282146005565°N 81.03146967470734°E
- Type: Horsetail
- Total height: 220 m (720 ft)
- Number of drops: 1
- Watercourse: Punagala Oya
- World height ranking: 619

Diyaluma Falls is 220 m (720 ft) high and the second highest waterfall in Sri Lanka and 619th highest waterfall in the world. It is situated 6 km (3.7 mi) away from Koslanda in Badulla District on Colombo-Badulla highway. The falls are formed by Punagala Oya, a tributary of Kuda Oya which in turn, is a tributary of Kirindi Oya.

== Etymology ==
In Sinhalese, Diyaluma or Diya Haluma means "rapid flow of water" or may be translated as "liquid light". According to Sri Lankan historian, Dr R. L. Brohier, Diyaluma is the setting of the folklore about a tragedy involving a young chieftain who had been banished to the highlands and the attempt by his betrothed to join. As all the passes were guarded the young man let down a rope of twisted creepers over the escarpment, as she was hauled up she was dashed against the rocks and died. The Gods moved to pity by the harrowing spectacle, caused a stream of water to gush from the mountain and veil all evidence of the tragedy in a watery light, hence the term Diyaluma.

== See also ==
- List of waterfalls
- List of waterfalls of Sri Lanka
