= List of museums in Sri Lanka =

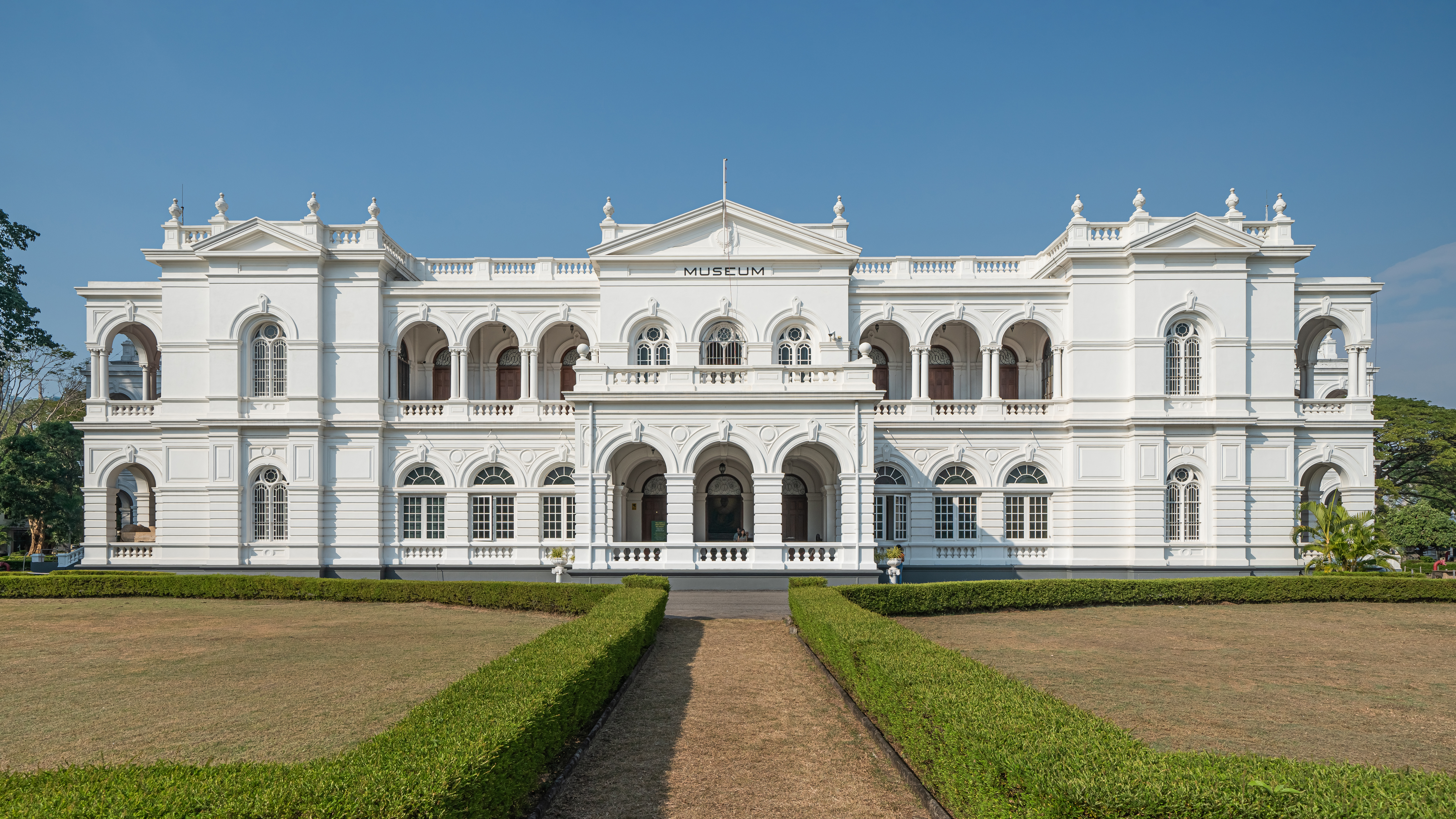
National Museum of Colombo established in 1877.

Below is a list of museums in Sri Lanka. For this context, museums are defined as institutions (including nonprofit organisations, government entities, and private businesses) that collect and care for objects of cultural, artistic, scientific or historical interest and make their collections or related exhibits available for public viewing.

== National Museums administered by the Department of Museums ==
=== National Museums ===
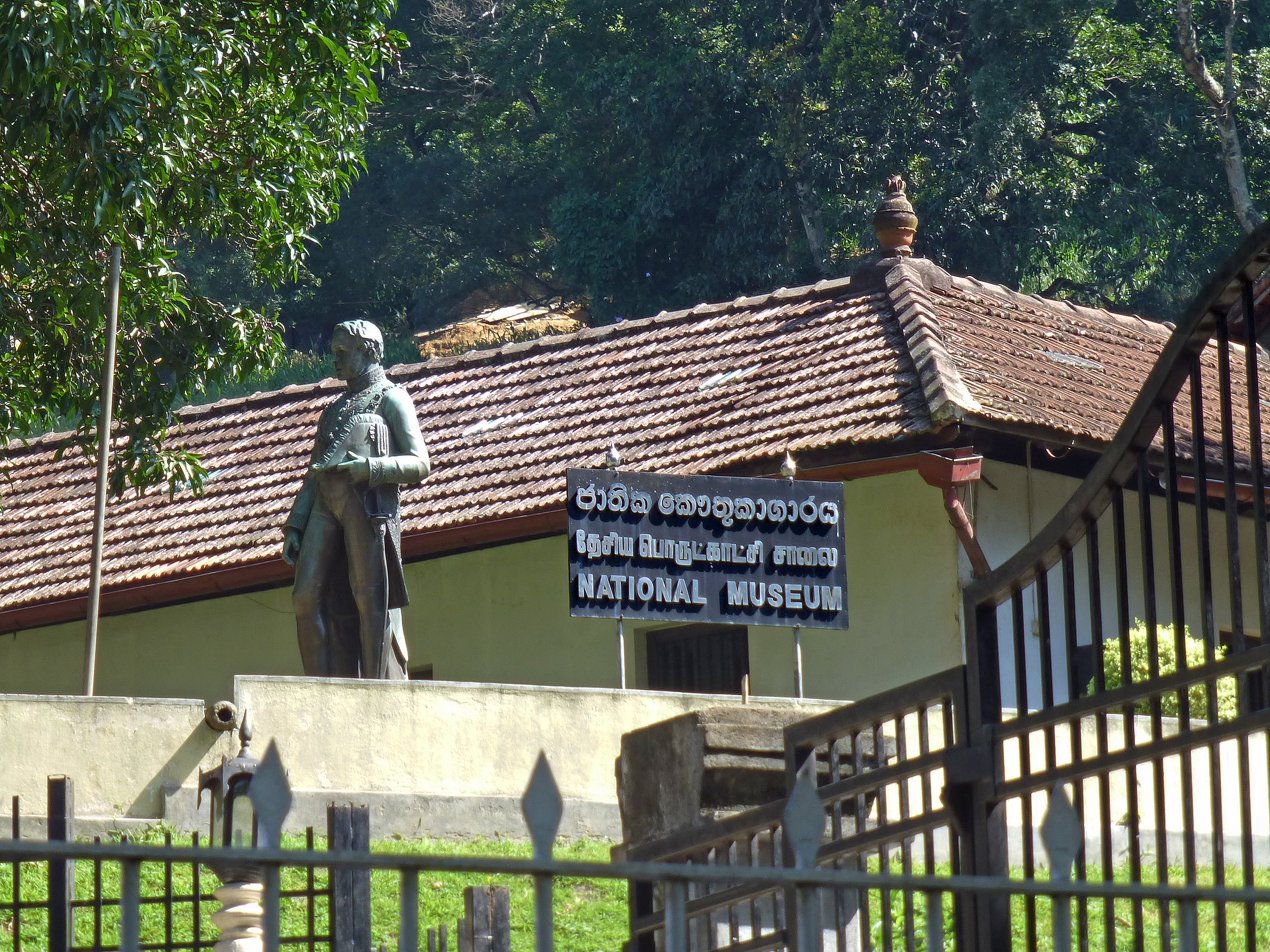
National Museum of Kandy established in 1942 is home to artifacts from the Kandian era

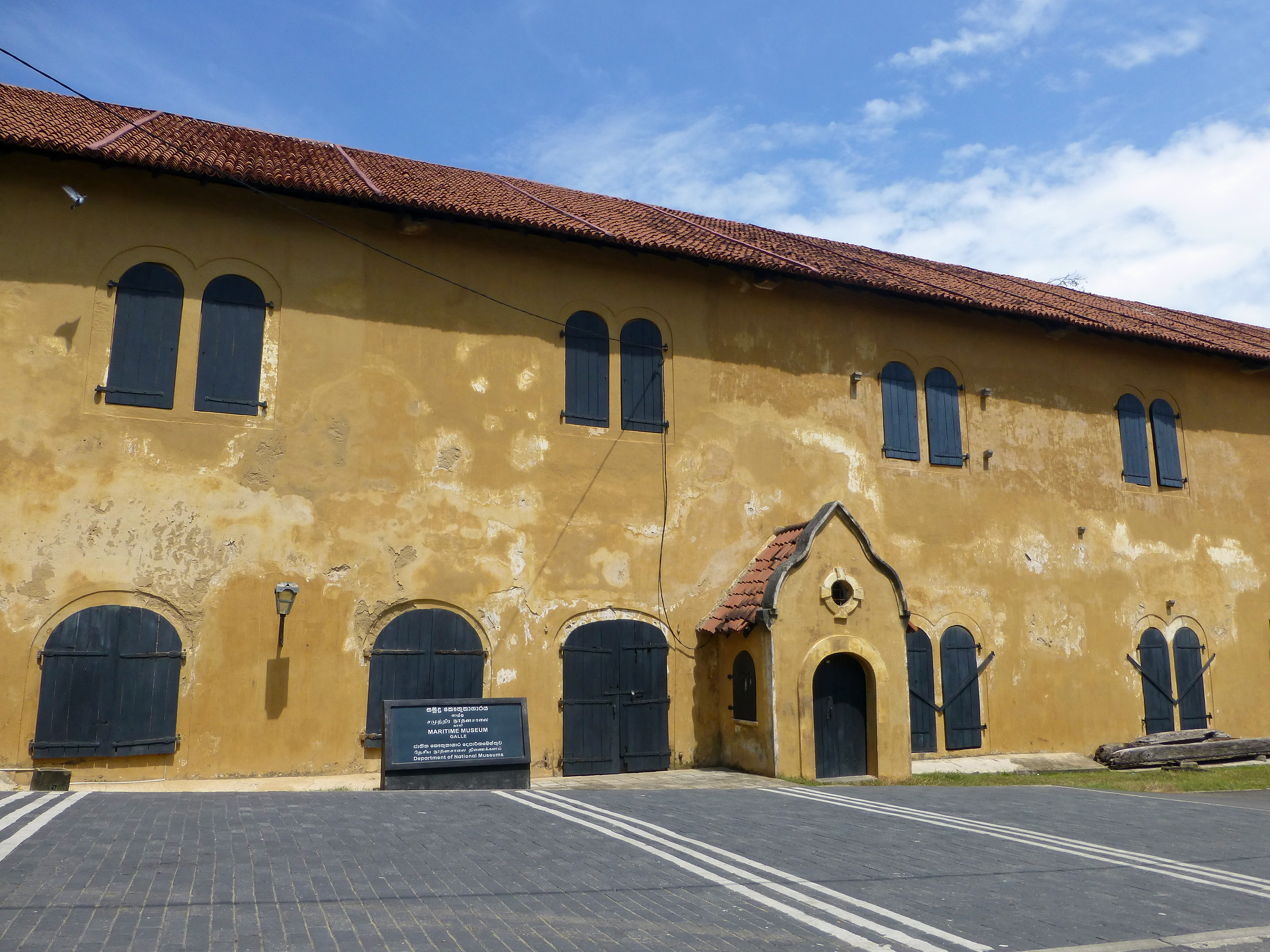
National Maritime Museum (Galle) was opened in 1992 and is located in a 1671 Dutch Warehouse

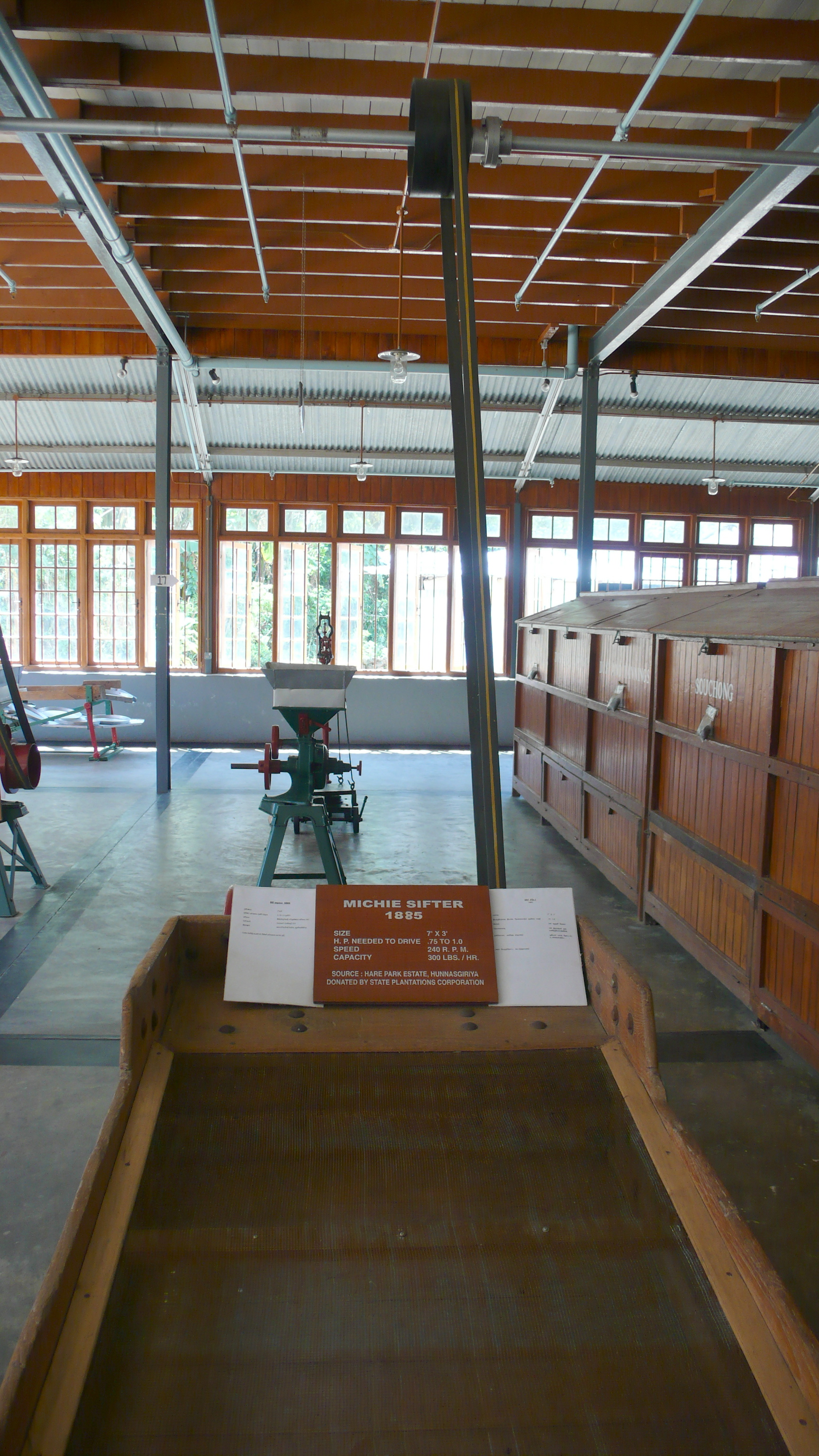
Tea making equipment, Ceylon Tea Museum, Kandy.

- National Museum of Colombo
- National Museum of Kandy
- National Museum of Galle
- National Museum of Ratnapura

=== Museums of particular subjects ===
- National Museum of Natural History, Colombo
- Colombo Dutch Museum
- National Maritime Museum (Galle)
- Independence Memorial Museum
- Folk Museum (Anuradhapura)

== Museums administered by the Department of Archaeology ==
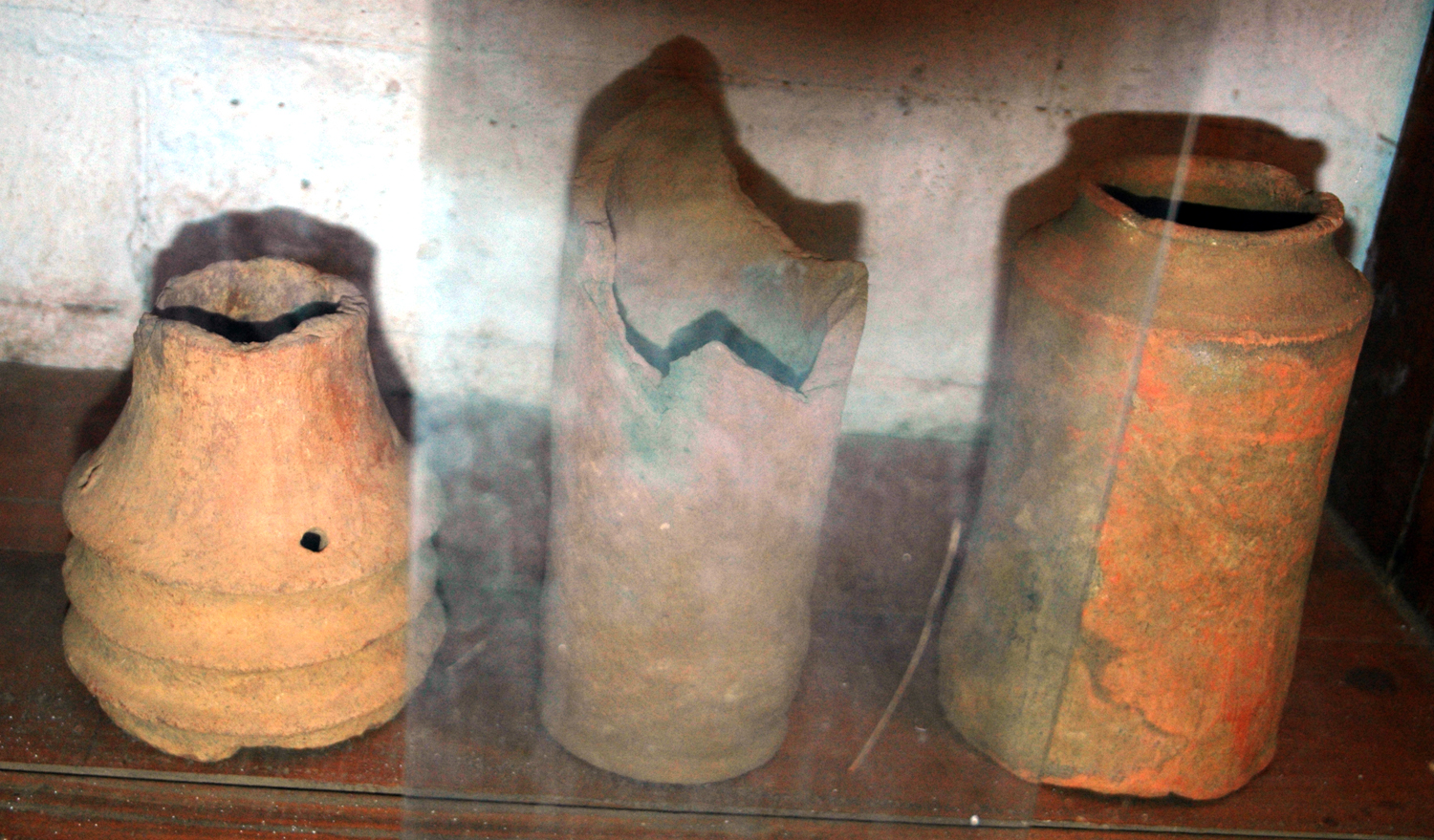
Terracotta Pipes, Jaffna Museum

=== North Central Province ===
- Anuradhapura Museum (National)
- Mihintale Museum (Site)
- Veheragala Museum (Site)
- Isurumuniya Museum (Site)
- Tantirimale Museum (Site)

=== North Western Province ===
- Panduwasnuwara Museum (Regional)
- Puttalam Museum (Site)
- Rajanganaya Museum (Site)
- Yapahuwa Museum (Site)
- Dambadeniya Museum (Site)

=== Central Province ===
- Kandy Royal Palace Museum (Regional)
- Nalanda Museum (Site)
- Pidurangala Museum (Site)

=== Eastern Province ===
- Batticaloa Museum (Site)
- Dighavapi Museum (Regional)
- Seruwila Museum (Site)
- Welgam Vehera Museum (Site)

=== Western Province ===
- Kotte Museum (Regional)

=== Southern Province ===
- Matara Star Fort Museum (Regional)
- Yatala Museum (Site)
- Kasagala Museum (Site)
- Mulkirigala Museum (Site)

=== Northern Province ===
- Jaffna Museum (Regional)
- Vavuniya Museum (Regional)

=== Uva Province ===
- Buduruwagala Museum (Regional)
- Maligawila Museum (Site)

=== Sabaragamuwa Province ===
- Dedigama Museum (Regional)

== Museums of particular subjects administered by the institutions of those subjects ==
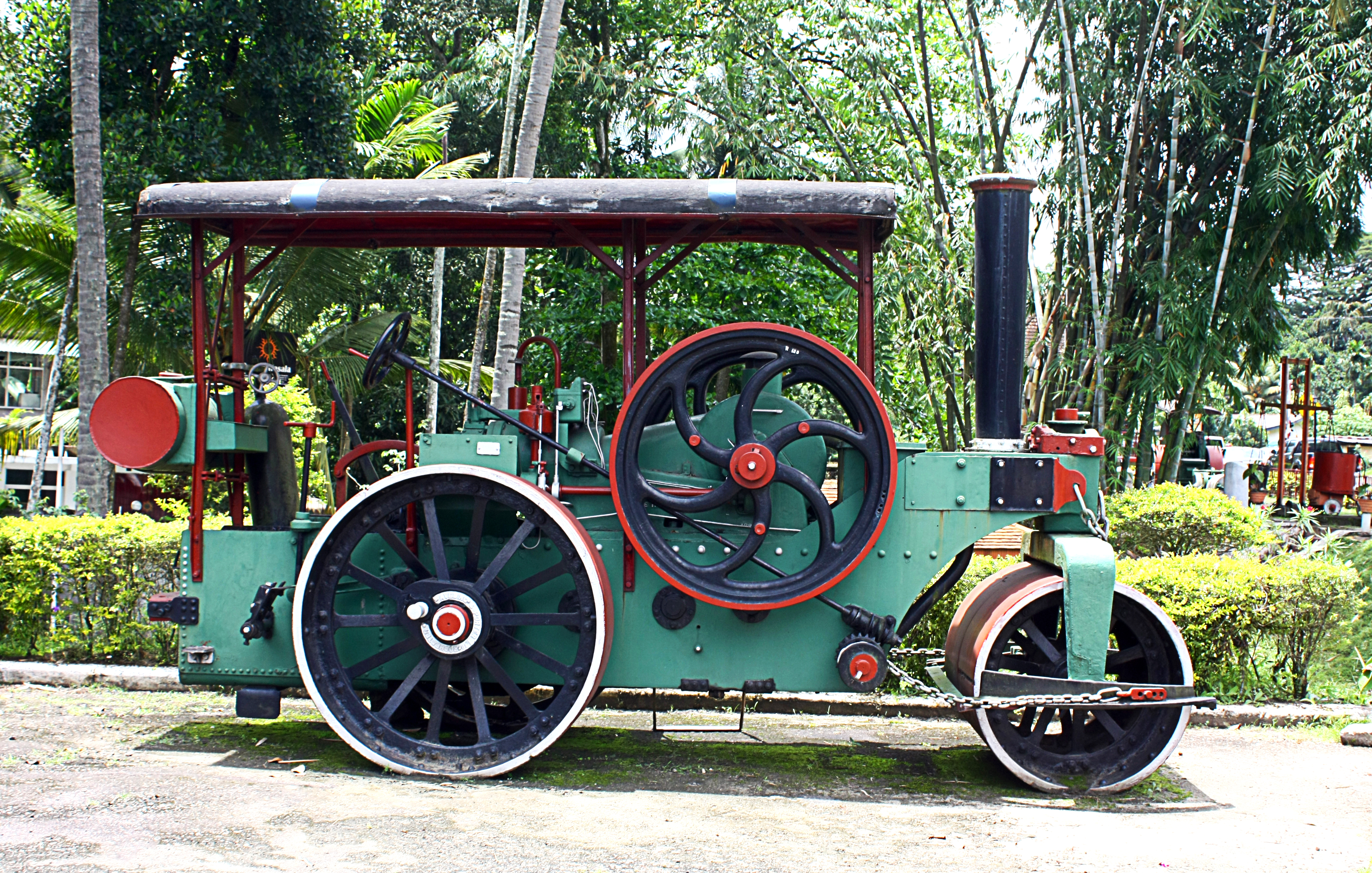
Steamroller at Highway museum complex in Kiribathkumbura

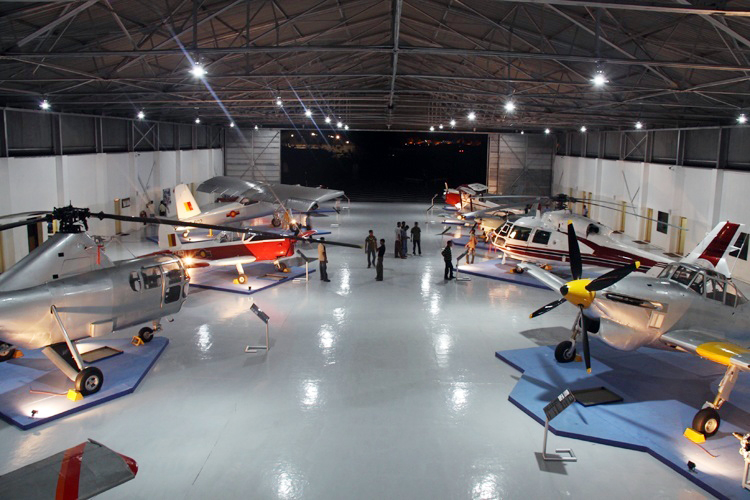
Aircraft on Exhibit in the main hangar of Sri Lanka Air Force Museum.

- Ceylon Tea Museum, Kandy
- Colombo Port Maritime Museum, Colombo
- Economic History Museum, Colombo
- Highway Museum, Kiribathkumbura
- Hoods Tower Museum, Trincomalee
- International Buddhist Museum, Kandy
- J. R. Jayewardene Centre, Colombo
- Martin Wickramasinghe Folk Museum, Galle
- Ambalangoda Mask Museum, Ambalangoda
- Museum of Temple of Tooth, Kandy
- National Telecommunication Museum, Padukka
- Postal Museum, Colombo
- Railway Museum, Kadugannawa
- S.W.R.D. Bandaranaike and Sirimavo Bandaranaike Memorial Museum, Colombo
- Sri Lanka Air Force Museum, Ratmalana
- Sri Lanka Cricket Museum, Colombo
- Walisinghe Harischandra Museum, Negombo
- Wax Museum, Polonnaruwa

== See also ==
- Tourism in Sri Lanka
- Culture of Sri Lanka
- List of museums
- Department of National Museum (Sri Lanka)
- Department of Archaeology (Sri Lanka)
