= Department of National Museums =

Non-ministerial government department in Sri Lanka

Agency overview
- Jurisdiction: Sri Lanka
- Website: www.museum.gov.lk

The Department of National Museums is a non-ministerial government department in Sri Lanka responsible for maintaining the National Museums. There are other museum in the country run by the Department of Archaeology and the Central Cultural Fund, Sri Lanka.

== National museums ==
- National Museum of Colombo
- National Museum of Kandy
- National Museum of Galle
- National Museum of Ratnapura

== Museums of particular subjects ==
- National Museum of Natural History, Colombo
- Colombo Dutch Museum
- National Maritime Museum (Galle)
- Independence Memorial Museum
- Folk Museum (Anuradhapura)
