= Thelma Gunawardena =

Sri Lankan entomologist and museum director

- Born: Thelma de Alwis; 1934; Colombo, Sri Lanka
- Died: 2015 (aged 80–81)
- Occupation: Museum Director
- Spouse: G. J. P. Gunawardane

Dr. Thelma Gunawardena (1934–2015) was the first female Director of the National Museum of Colombo. She was also the Director of National Museums for Sri Lanka.

== Life ==
Thelma de Alwis was born in Colombo, Sri Lanka, in 1934. She attended the University of Colombo where she received a Bachelor of Science in zoology. In 1961 she married G. J. P. Gunawardane with whom she had four sons. She subsequently attended the Imperial College of Science and Technology in London, England, earning her PhD in entomology in 1968.

In the 1970s Gunawardena worked on reducing insect damage to coconut trees, an important agricultural product in Sri Lanka.

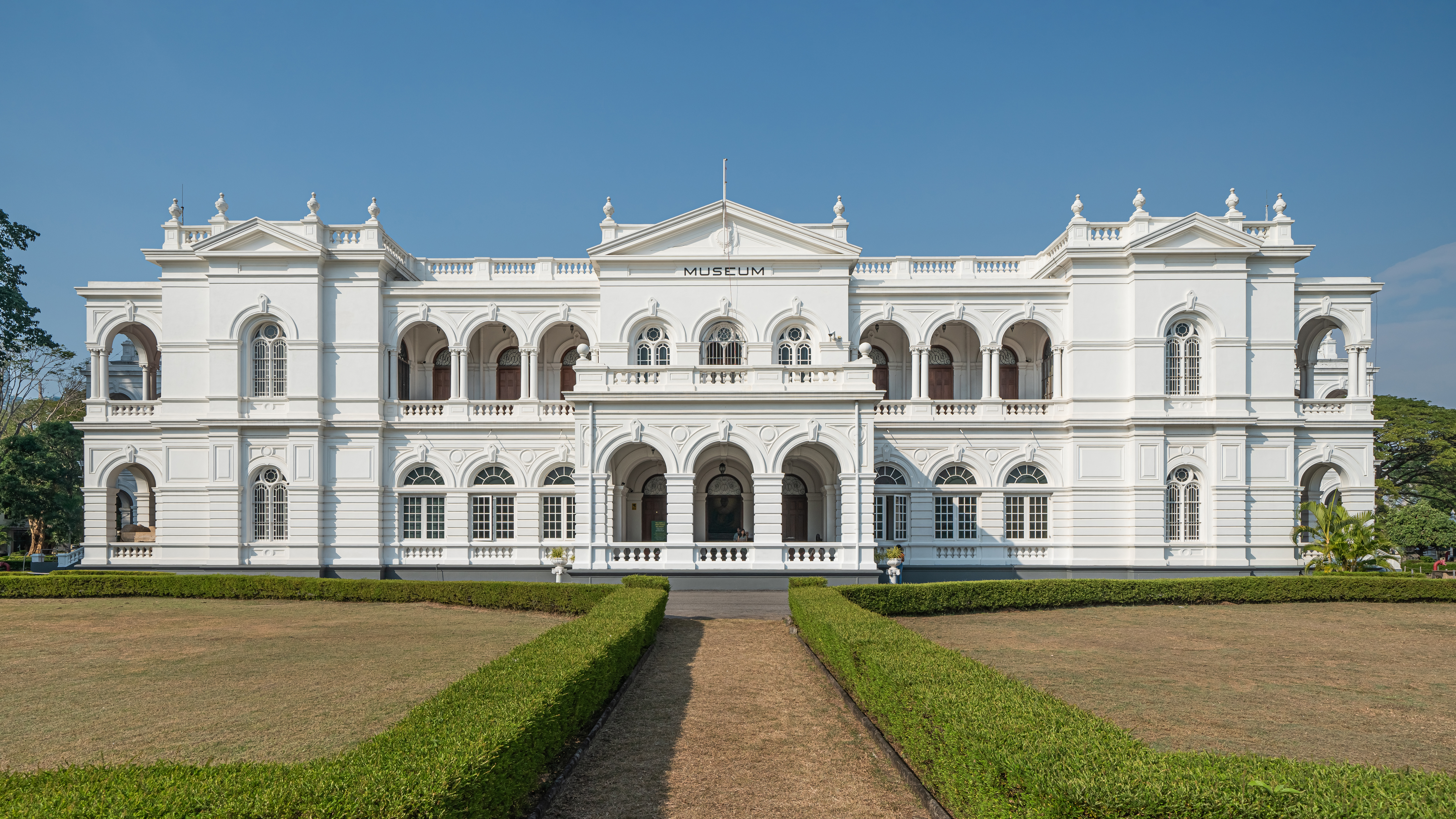
National Museum of Colombo

In 1982 Gunawardena became the Director of National Museums and Director of the National Museum of Colombo. She served as Director of the National Museum of Colombo from 1982 through 1994. She contributed to the establishment of the Colombo Dutch Museum, the National Museum of Galle, the National Museum of Natural History, Colombo, and the National Maritime Museum in Galle.

Gunawardena died on 23 January 2015.
