= Currency Museum =

Currency Museum may refer to:

- Currency Museum (Bahrain), a currency museum in the Central Bank of Bahrain
- Bank of Canada Museum, a currency museum at the Bank of Canada headquarters
- Currency museum, Colombo, a currency museum in Sri Lanka
- Currency Museum of the Bank of Japan, a currency museum in front of the Bank of Japan
- Bank of Jamaica Currency Museum
- Museo Casa de Moneda, a currency museum in Colombia
