= Panduwasnuwara Museum =

Sri Lankan archaeological museum

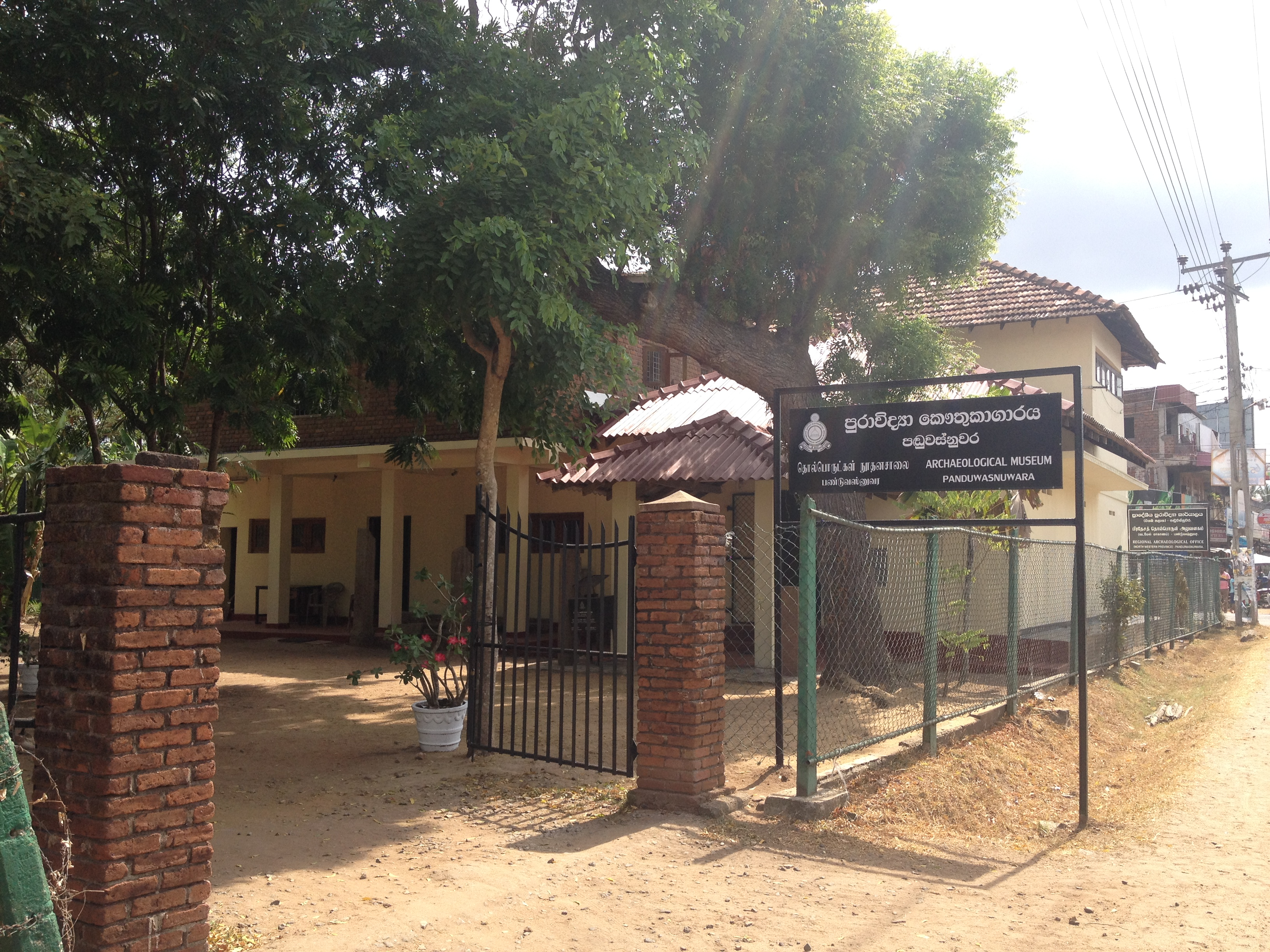
- Archaeological Museum, Panduwasnuwara
- Established: Around 1970s
- Location: Panduwasnuwara, Sri Lanka
- Coordinates: 7°36′18.6″N 80°06′05.4″E
- Type: Archaeological
- Website: http://www.archaeology.gov.lk

Panduwasnuwara Archaeological Museum is an archaeological Museum in Panduwasnuwara, Sri Lanka. It is located at Kotampitiya junction on Kurunegala-Chilaw road, near to the ancient shrine Panduwasnuwara Raja Maha Vihara. The museum serve as the regional museum for North Western Province of the country and is maintained by Archaeological department of Sri Lanka.

The museum is used to display a collection of archaeological antiquities, found in excavations, donations, artifacts received under court orders and from the Kurunegala Provincial Council Museum. Among the artifacts small statues, stones, metals, terracotta, timber findings, coins, pottery and Jewelleries can be seen.

== History ==
The museum was established during the 1970s for first time and in 1977 it was arranged in the quarters of the Officer in Charge. Currently the museum has been established in an old building which was acquired by the department in 1983.

== See also ==
- List of museums in Sri Lanka
