= Mihintale Museum =

Mihintale Archaeological Museum
- මිහින්තලේ පුරාවිද්‍යා කෞතුකාගාරය
- Established: 1984
- Location: Mihintale, Sri Lanka
- Coordinates: 8.3555°N 80.5133°E
- Type: Archaeological Museum
- Owner: Department of Archaeology, Sri Lanka.
- Website: http://www.archaeology.gov.lk

Mihintale Archaeological Museum is an archaeological museum in Mihinthale, Anuradhapura district, North Central province, Sri Lanka.

== Location ==
This Archaeological Museum can be reached after 200 meters on the Kandy road in the south direction from the main roundabout in the center of Mihintale. Any visitor can reach this museum at the way to the Mihintale Stairway, in front of the Mihintale historical Hospital Complex.

== History ==
This building, which was maintained as a retirement hall, was later taken over by the Department of Archaeology of Sri Lanka. and prepared as a museum and opened on June 24, 1984 by Mr. Ranasinghe Premadasa, who held the position of Prime Minister at that time. After continuous operation for 22 years, building was in a dilapidated condition, and in the year 2006, another repair work was started and it was opened to public on May 31, 2010.

== Collection ==
The museum exhibits archaeological objects found in Mihintale and surrounding areas. It contains bronze figurines, ancient tools, fragments of frescoes and paintings. major holding of the museum is the salivated original relic chamber (Dhātu garbha;ධාතු ගර්භය) from a Giribhanda Stupa in Mihinthale hill.

"...........

52. The conservation of the three basal terraces of the stiipa to the east of the Kantaka Cetiya, excavated in 1951, was continued, the mouldings being restored to their pristine shape for a considerable part of the circumference. In dealing with this stupa, a problem that had to be tackled was the preservation of the paintings in the lower garbha. A pit dug through loose debris was the only means of obtaining access to this garbha and the cutting through the floor of the upper chamber had necessarily to be restricted in its dimensions. If the paintings were to be preserved in situ, and at the same time made accessible to students of art and archaeology, the sides of the pit dug through loose debris had to be lined with masonry, the cutting through the floor of the upper chamber widened and a flight of steps provided. Such a course would not have left masonry to an adequate thickness to ensure the stability of the dome, of which the facing had crumbled down right round the circumference from a height of two or three feet above the uppermost of the basal terraces. Another alternativé was to open a passage from a side, which too was equally undesirable when the stability of what remains of the monument was taken into consideration. As thé stability of the outer shell could not be guaranteed, it would have been dangerous for visitors to go down to the chamber which was at ground level. The paintings them selves would have been affected by moisture, and with all the expense that would have been incurred by adopting either of the two courses above detailed, the continued existence of the paintings, which was their aim, would not have been guaranteed There was thus no other alternative but to remove the paintings to the nearest museum, at Anuradhapura.

53. This work, too, was fraught with almost insuperable difficulties. The plaster on which the paintings have been executed was hard, but it was cracked here and there, and firmly bound to the brick masonry. Thus any attempt to separate the plaster from the masonry would have resulted in the former falling to pieces, and the loss of the paintings. The only possible course was to remove the plaster together with a sufficient thickness of the brick-masonry to support it. For this it was necessary to cut through the brickwork with chisels in such a manner as to cause no damage to the plaster. The inherent difficulties of such a task were intensified by the restricted space available for the persons engaged in it to move about and manipulate their tools. It was also dangerous due to the necessarily irregular sides of a cutting through loose debris. If the vibration caused by the work in the chamber at the bottom of the deep pit made some of the loose masonry to fall down, the men engaged in the task would have been buried under it .The heavy stone slabs which covered the chamber, had to be lifted up by means of chain blocks without causing damage to the chamber itself and avoiding the sides of the pit. The unfortunate accident at Mahasaya which occurred in 1952 discouraged any one from attempting the task. Those who are qualified to express an opinion on such matters recommended elaborate shorings of the sides of the pit before any one was sent to the lower chamber to remove the paintings, and prophesied disaster if these elaborate measures were not carried out. The finances of the department, however, could not afford the expense of putting up such shorings. In this predicament, Mr. Sarath Vattala, the Modeller of the department, offered to carry out the task successfully and with precautionary measures none the less efficient for being of comparatively low cost. He and his two skilled workmen, in spite of the fact that they had no paper qualifications whatever to ensure success, succeeded in detaching the plaster bearing the paintings with enough of masonry backing and lifted the heavy blocks of masonry with the help of chain blocks causing no appreciable damage to them. This he did without any assurance, and indeed the possibility, of earning any reward for carrying out this difficult job which is no part of his normal duties, but he is certain of the gratitude of lovers of art for generations to come for having been instrumental in ensuring the continued existence of one of the most interesting specimens of the pictorial art of ancient Ceylon. The overseer at Mihintalé, and indeed all the labourers who helped Mr. Vattala in this task, must share in the credit for this achievement, for they ungrudgingly gave their co-operation.

54. The sides of the garbha have been built up where the original masonry has been removed and the covering slabs put back into their positions. The pit itself has been filled in. On the northern side, the retaining wall which held the majuva of the étipa has crumbled down. The clearing of the basal terraces on this side and their conservation have to be undertaken after the retaining wall has been re-built. ......"

Quoted from Page No.14 and 15, Administration Report, 1953.

Antiquities belonging to the historical hospital complex and nearly 200 different antiquities found in the Mihintale archaeological site are displayed in this museum. Among them, surgical instruments, Persian clay pots, deity figures, clay figures used for peace rituals etc. found in Mihintale Hospital are highlighted.

=== Galleries ===
There are 7 displaying galleries in Mihinthale Museum and they are as follow;

1. Introduction to Stupas - In reference to Mihintale
2. Important information related to various monuments of the earth
3. Water Management at Mihintale premises
4. Antiquities found at different places
5. Use of Jantāgara - Mihinthalaya premises
6. Historic Hospital of Mihintale premises
7. Sanitation related to Mihintale Monastery

=== Selected exhibits from the Mihintale Archaeological Museum ===
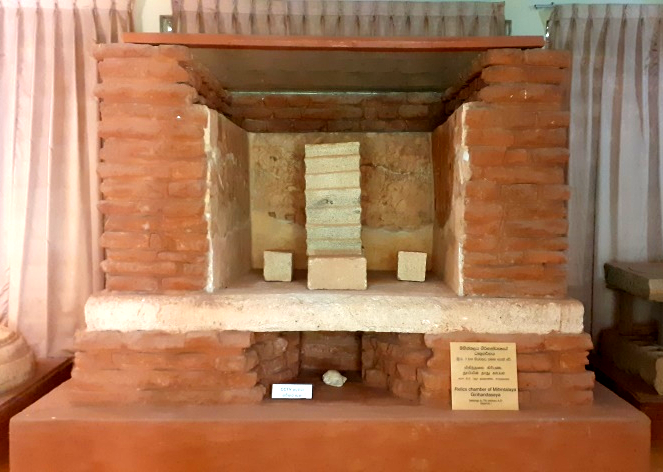
Giribhanda stupa relic chamber, Mihinthale Hills

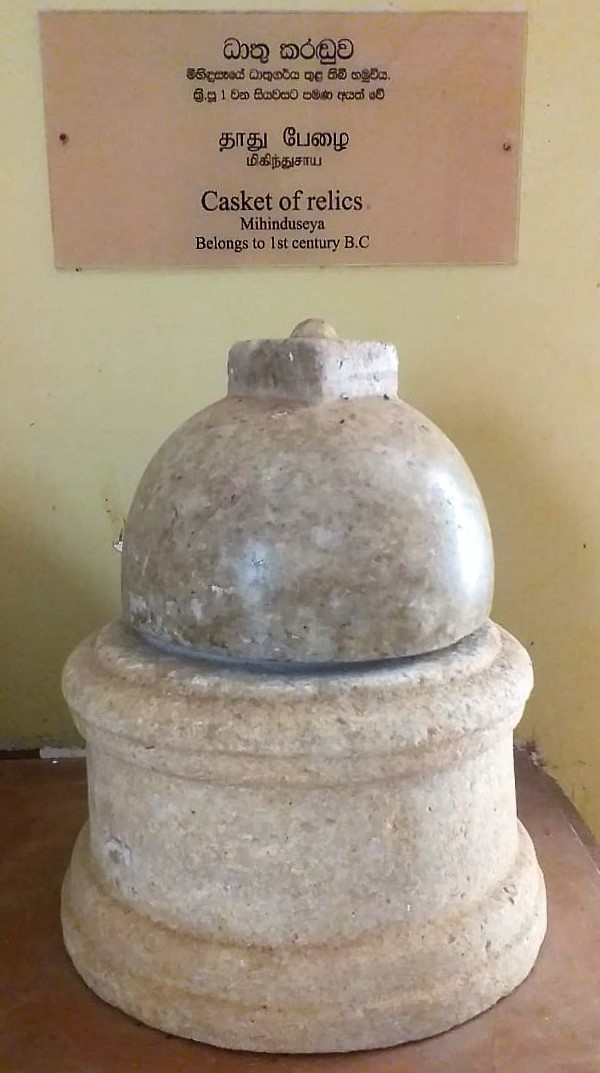
Relic Casket from Mihindu Seya, Mihinthale Hills

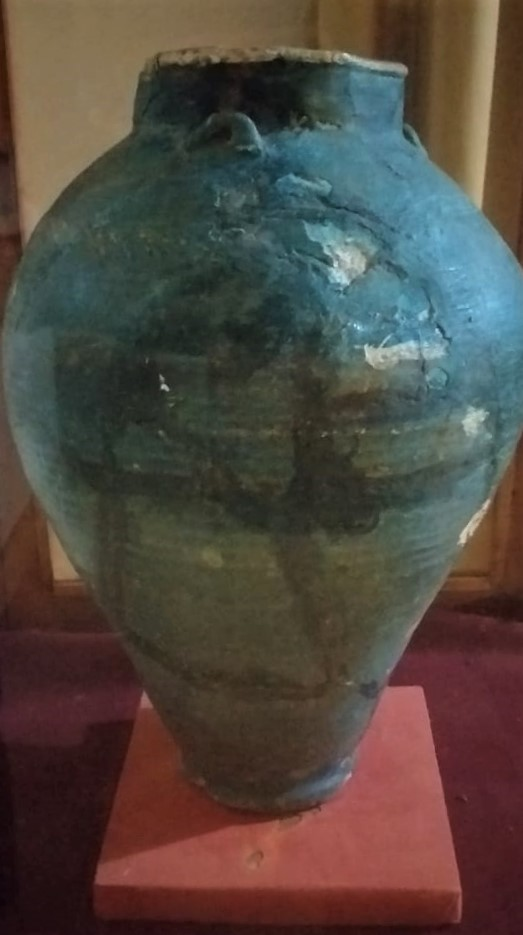
Persian pottery from Mihinthale monastic hospital

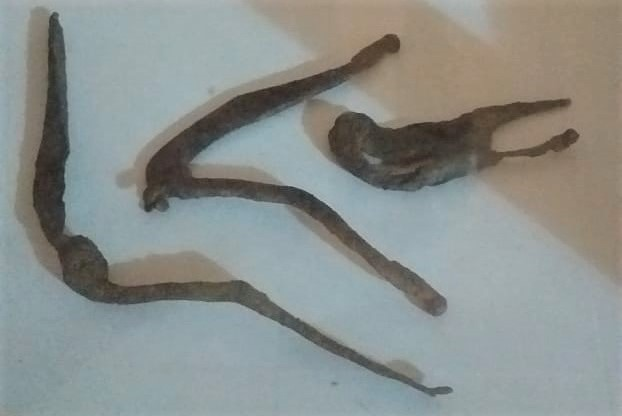
Metal Equipment from Mihinthale monastic Hospital premises

== See also ==
- List of museums in Sri Lanka
