= Isurumuniya Museum =

Isurumuniya Archaeological Museum
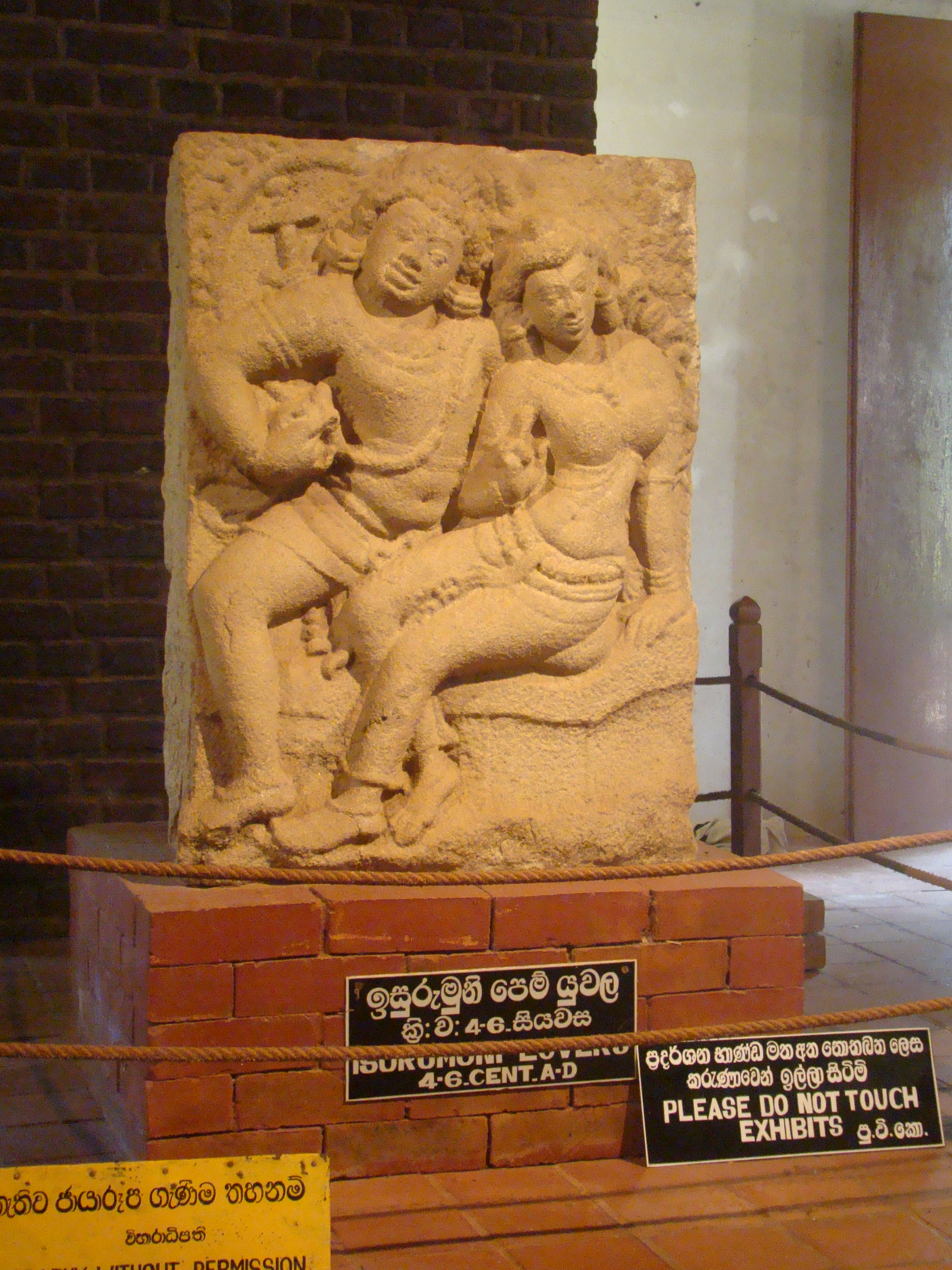
- Isurmuniya lovers
- Established: 1984
- Location: Isurumuniya, Sri Lanka
- Type: Archaeological
- Website: http://www.archaeology.gov.lk

Isurumuniya Archaeological Museum is a site museum located in Isurumuniya, Sri Lanka. It was established in Isurumuni vihara in 1984. The museum is maintained by Department of Archaeology of Sri Lanka.

The museum exhibits some valuable pieces of sculptures found in vihara premises. The most famed sculpture amongst them is the Gupta styled carving of Isurumuni lovers which belongs to the 5th century. It is believed to have been found from the royal pleasure garden. The other significant stone sculptures in the museum are the royal court (or the royal family), the Kavata sculptures, Kuvera Triod, Sculptures of Kinnaras and figures of dwarves.

== See also ==
- List of museums in Sri Lanka
