= Archaeological Museum, Vavuniya =

Museum in Sri Lanka

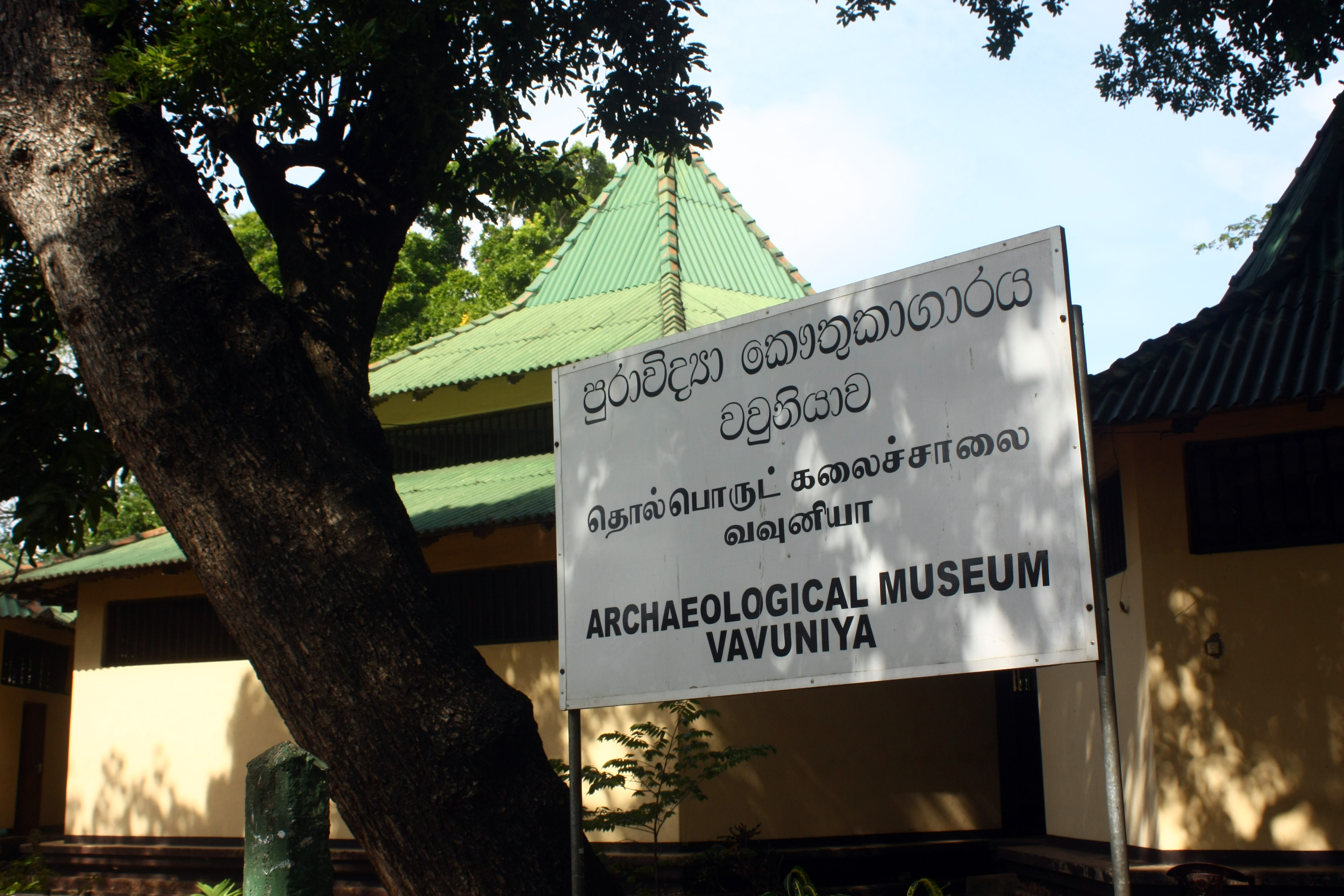
- Archaeological Museum, Vavuniya

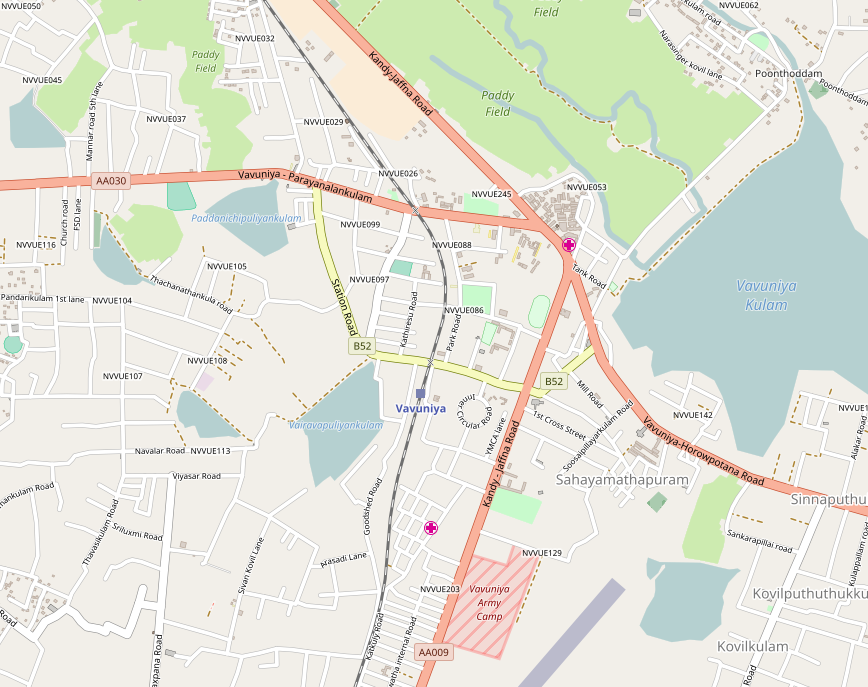
- Location in central Vavuniya
- Location: Vavuniya, Sri Lanka
- Coordinates: 8°45′30.8″N 80°30′00.2″E
- Type: Archaeological
- Website: http://www.archaeology.gov.lk

Vavuniya Archaeological Museum is a regional museum located in Vavuniya town, Sri Lanka. It was founded and owned by Department of Archaeology of Sri Lanka. This regional museum covers and exhibits archaeological objects that found in Vavuniya area and its surroundings.

The museum has fifth to eighth centuries antiques, statues of Buddha, statues of Hindu goddess and a few Christian object such as baptismal font.

== Opening hours ==
The museum is open from 8.30 AM to 5.00 PM and close on Tuesday and on public holidays. The entrance fee is free. Photography is prohibited unless permission is obtained.

== See also ==
- List of museums in Sri Lanka
