= Walisinghe Harischandra Museum =

Brahmachari Walisingha Harischandra Museum
- Former name: Mahagedara
- Established: 13 September 1996; 29 years ago
- Location: Mahahunupitiya, Negombo, Western Province, Sri Lanka
- Coordinates: 7°13′18.4″N 79°51′49.0″E
- Type: Biographical museum
- Founder: Walisinghe Hariswandra Cultural Centre
- Curator: P. A. D. Fernando

Brahmachari Walisingha Harischandra Museum (Sinhala: වලිසිංහ හරිශ්චන්ද්‍ර කෞතුකාගාරය සහ සංස්කෘතික මධ්‍යස්ථානය) is located in Negombo, Western Province, Sri Lanka. Named after the Buddhist revivalist, social reformer and writer Walisinghe Harischandra (1876-1913). The museum was established in 1996 and is housed in Harischandra's former residence, Mahagedara, which is managed by the Walisinghe Hariswandra Cultural Centre. The museum was initially managed by the Department of Museums. The residence was transferred to the Ministry of Culture and Religious Affairs on 24 June 2011.

The museum contains furniture, book, diaries and personal effects used by Harischandra, together with local objects and artifacts from his era.

== See also ==
- Independence Memorial Museum
