= Colombo National Museum =

Museum in Colombo, Sri Lanka

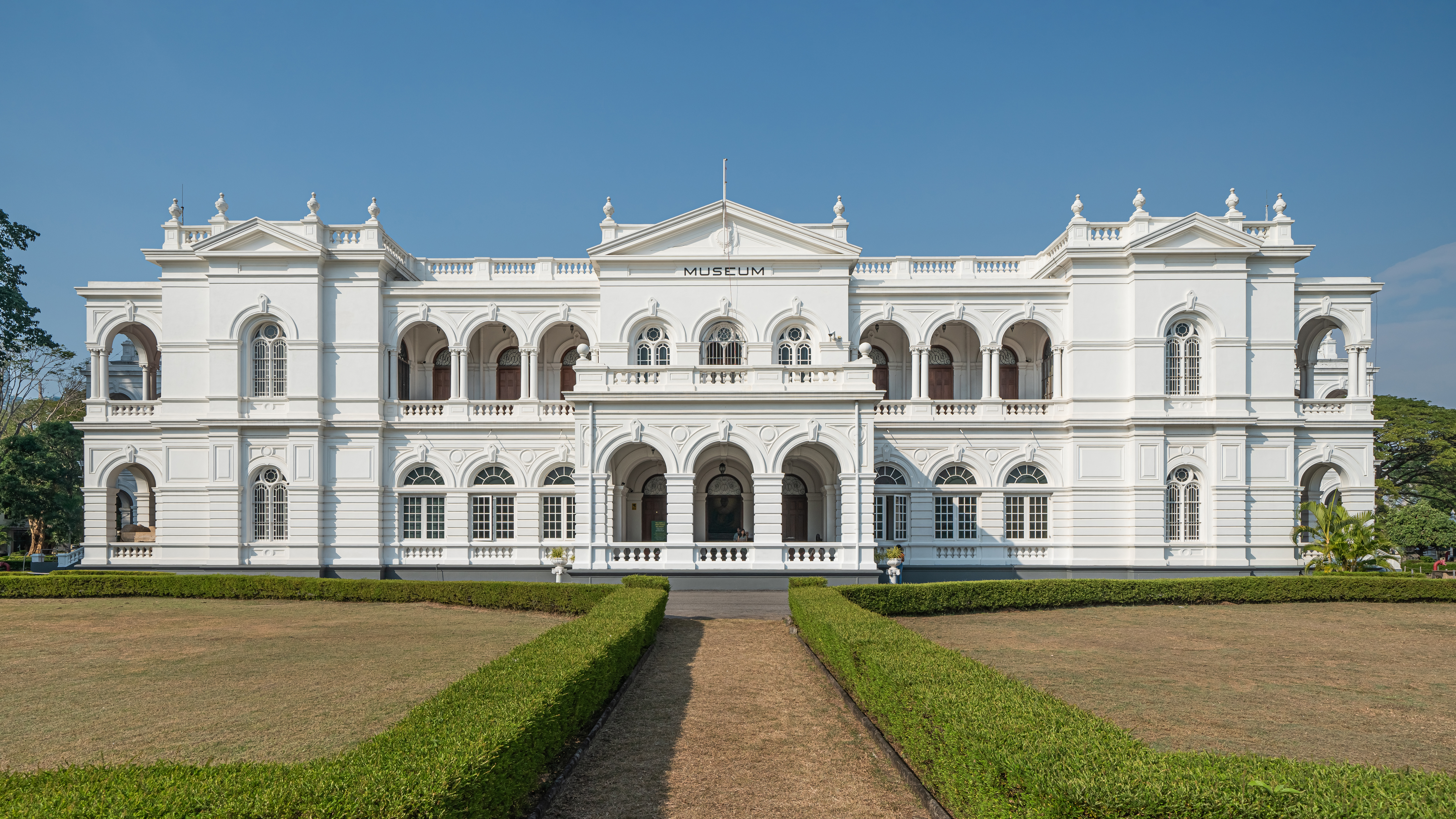
- Facade of the museum in 2020

- Location in greater Colombo
- Established: 1 January 1877
- Location: Colombo, Sri Lanka
- Coordinates: 6°54′36″N 79°51′39″E
- Founder: William Henry Gregory
- Website: museum.gov.lk

The Colombo National Museum, also known as the Sri Lanka National Museum, is a museum in Colombo and the largest in Sri Lanka. Founded in 1877 and maintained by the Department of National Museums, it holds collections of significant importance to Sri Lanka, such as the regalia of the Kandyan monarchs, as well as many other exhibits relating the country's cultural and natural heritage.

== History ==
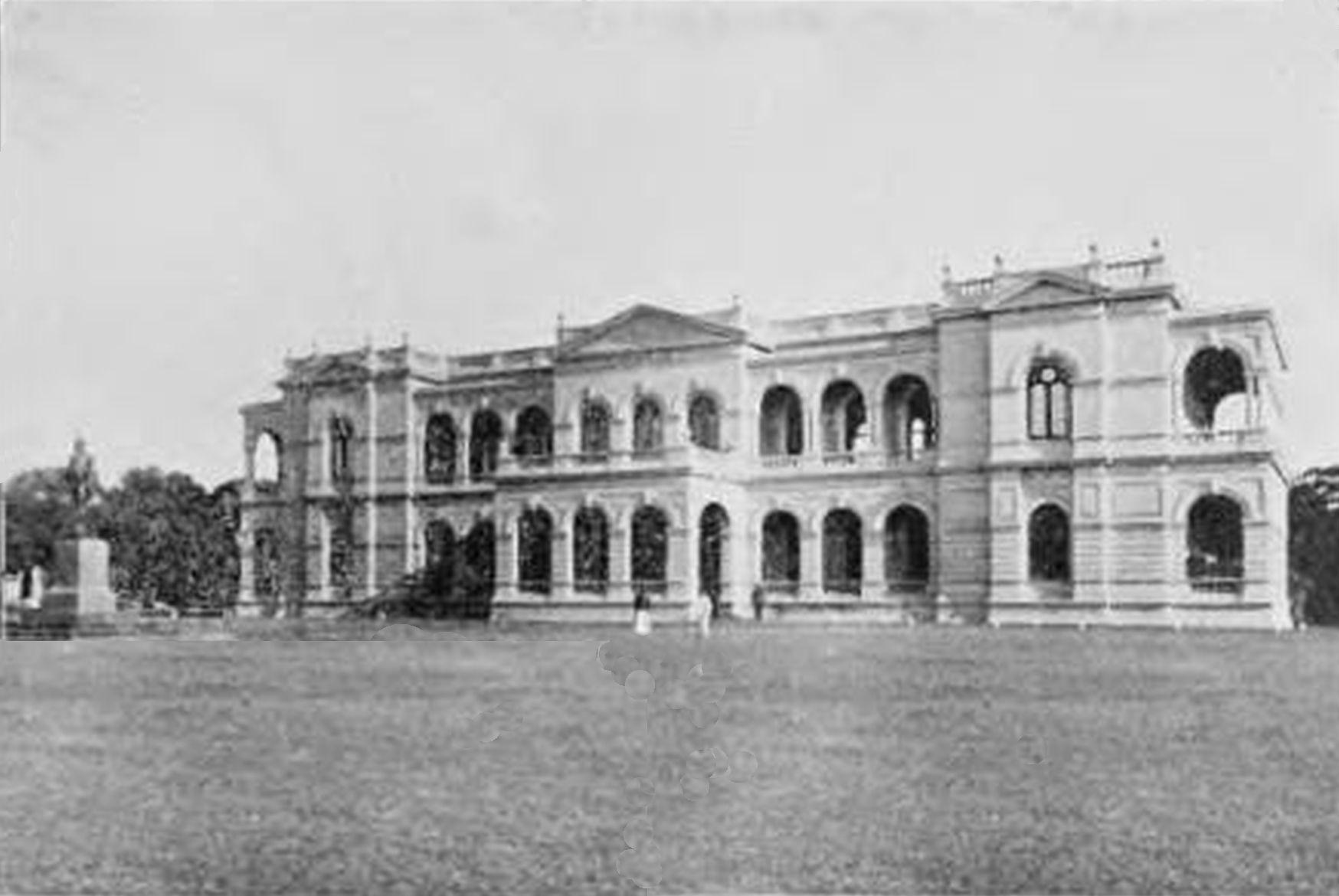
Museum in 1896

The Colombo Museum, as it was initially called, was established on 1 January 1877. Its founder was Sir William Henry Gregory the British Governor of Ceylon. The Royal Asiatic Society was instrumental in bringing to the notice of Gregory on his appointment as governor in 1872 the need for a public museum, with some difficulty the approval of the legislative council was obtained within a year. The Government architect of the Public Works Department, James George Smither (1833–1910) was able to prepare the plans for a new structure in the Italian Architectural style. The construction was completed in 1876 and the museum opened the following year.

The construction of the museum was carried out by Arasi Marikar Wapchie Marikar (1829–1925, aka Wapchi Marikar, who was descended from the Sheiq Fareed family who arrived in Ceylon in 1060), the paternal grandfather of Sir Razik Fareed. Wapchi Marikar was the builder of the General Post Office, Colombo Customs building, Town Hall in Pettah, Galle Face Hotel, Victoria Arcade, Finlay Moir building, the Colombo Fort clock tower, Batternburg Battery and a number of other buildings that are still standing today (2011). The Old Town Hall in Pettah, which is now a busy market, was built on a contract for the sum of 689 Pounds Sterling.

In January 1877, the completed building of the Colombo Museum was declared open by Governor Gregory, in the presence of a large crowd, amongst which there were many Muslims. At the end of the ceremony, the governor asked Wapchi Marikar what honour he wished to have for his dedication. He asked the same question of the carpenter S. M. Perera who was responsible for the woodwork of the museum, who requested and was awarded a local rank. Marikar requested that the museum be closed on Fridays, the Muslim sabbath; this request was granted and maintained, although the museum later opened on all days except public holidays.

When the throne of the last Kandyan king was to be exhibited at the museum, the prime minister, D. S. Senanayake, obtained the consent of Sir Razik Fareed, Wapchi Marikar's grandson, to keep the museum open on the intervening Fridays only.

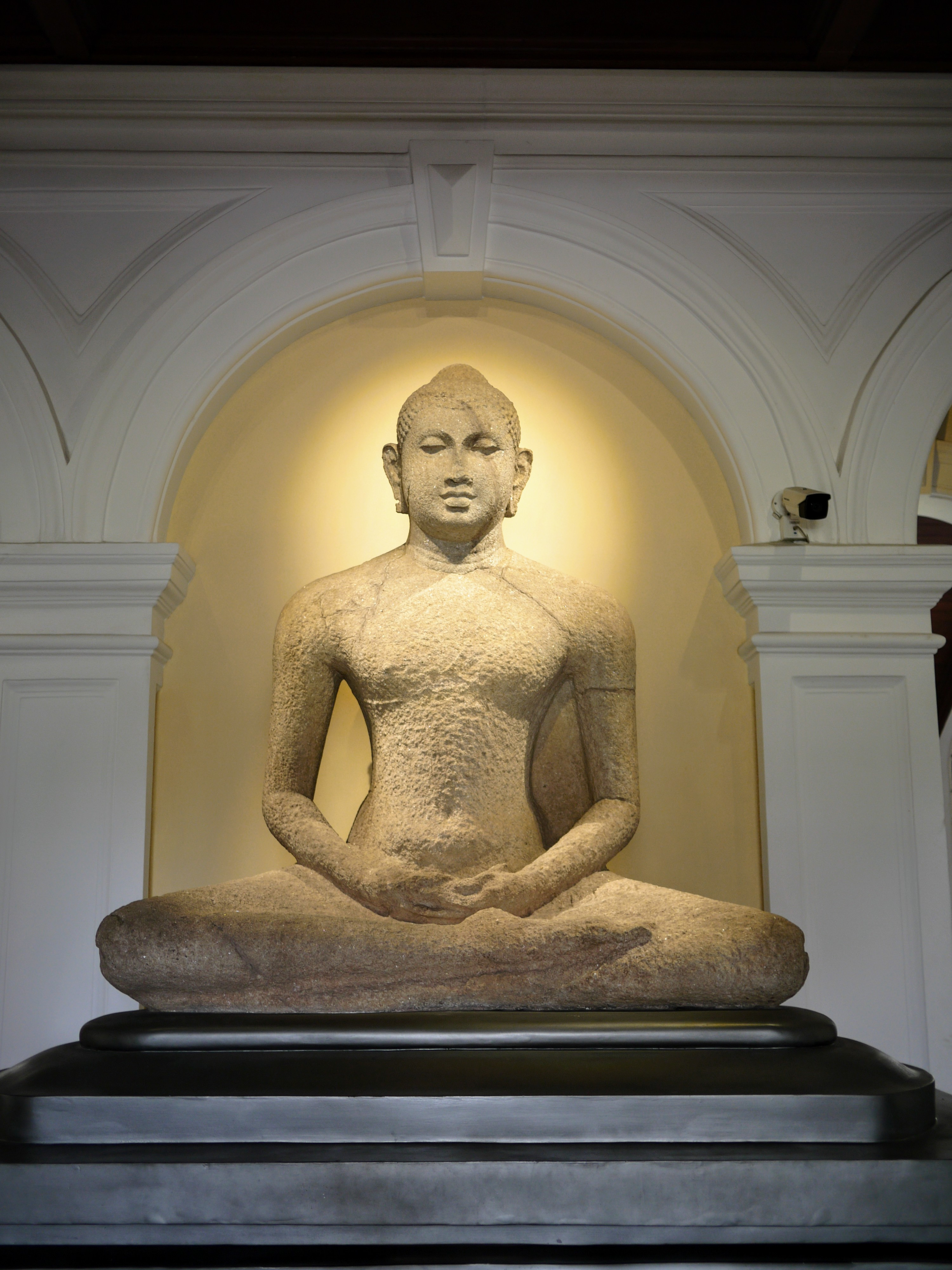
Sculpture of the Buddha located at the entrance of the museum.(Toluwila statue)

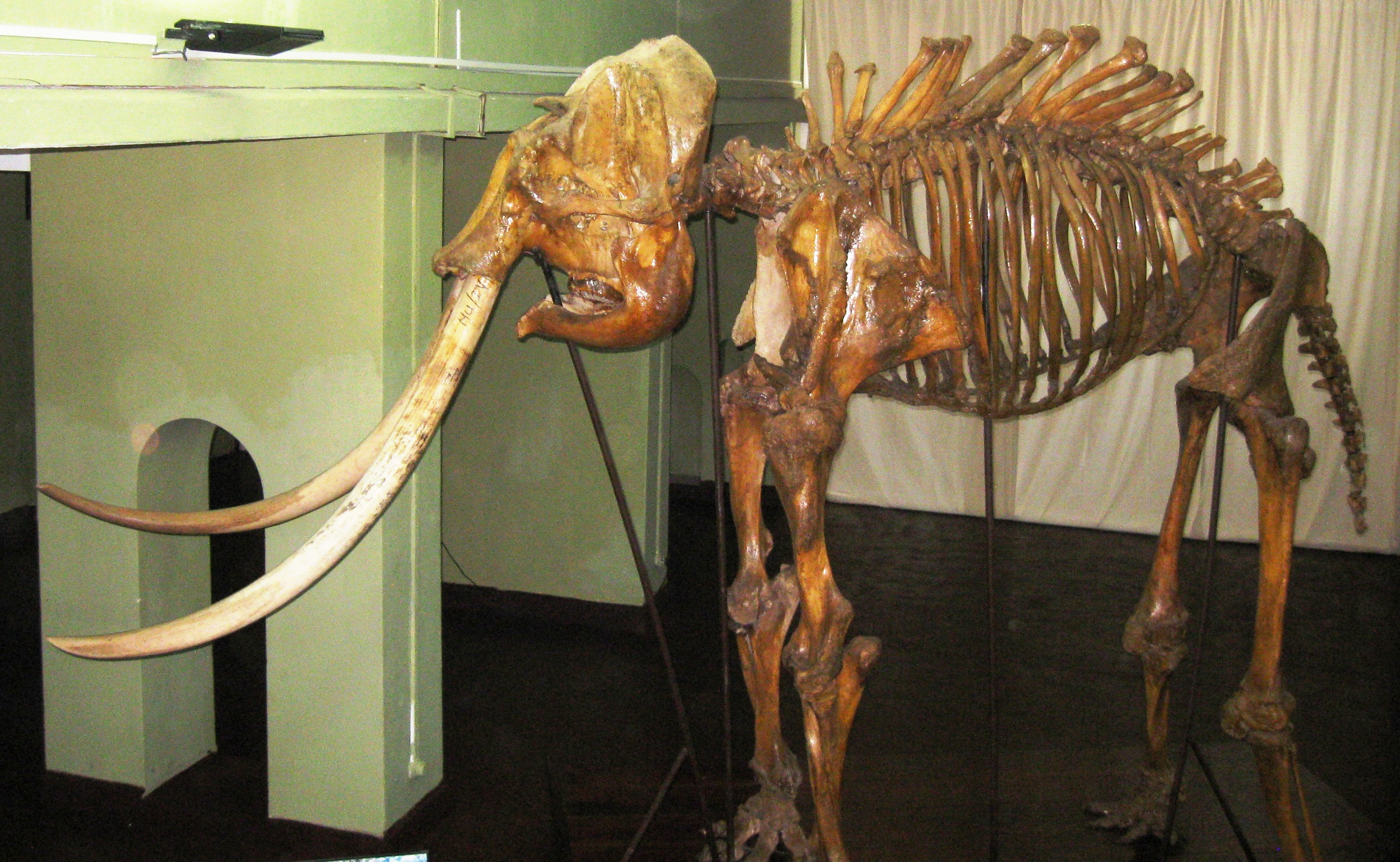
Heiyantuduwa Raja (elephant) Skeleton at National Museum of Colombo, Sri Lanka

During the period between 1877 and 1999, the authorities of the museum took various steps to display the cultural and natural heritage of the country for this purpose. Several other wings were added from time to time under the direction of Dr. Arthur Willey and Dr. Joseph Pearson new structures were built during the period of Dr. P. E. P. Deraniyagala, Dr. P. H. D. H. de Silva and Sirinimal Lakdusinghe. One of the natural history museum, and yet another consists of the auditorium. These buildings would facilitate the extension of the library ethnological and Anthropological studies.

== Developments after 1940 ==
The museum was given the status of a national museum during the period of P. E. P. Deraniyagala. He opened branch museums in Jaffna, Kandy, and Ratnapura and a fully-fledged department of national museum was established in 1942 under the act No. 31. Nine branch museums were ultimately opened, and a school science programme and a mobile museum service are also in operation.

The museum has a copy of the Statue of Tara, a three-quarter life size statue of Tara currently held in the British Museum. The crown jewels and the throne of the last King of Kandy, which were returned to Sri Lanka by the British Government, were added to the museum collection. Ground floor galleries are arranged in historical sequence, and upper galleries thematically.

A library was also established on 1 January 1877. The government Oriental library (1870) was incorporated into Colombo National Museum library, and served as the nucleus of the library collection by collecting the local publications of the past 129 years; the library has been functioning as an unofficial national library in Sri Lanka, and became the first legal deposit library in the island. From its inception, special attention was given to building up of a collection related to Sri Lanka, Orientation and Natural Science.

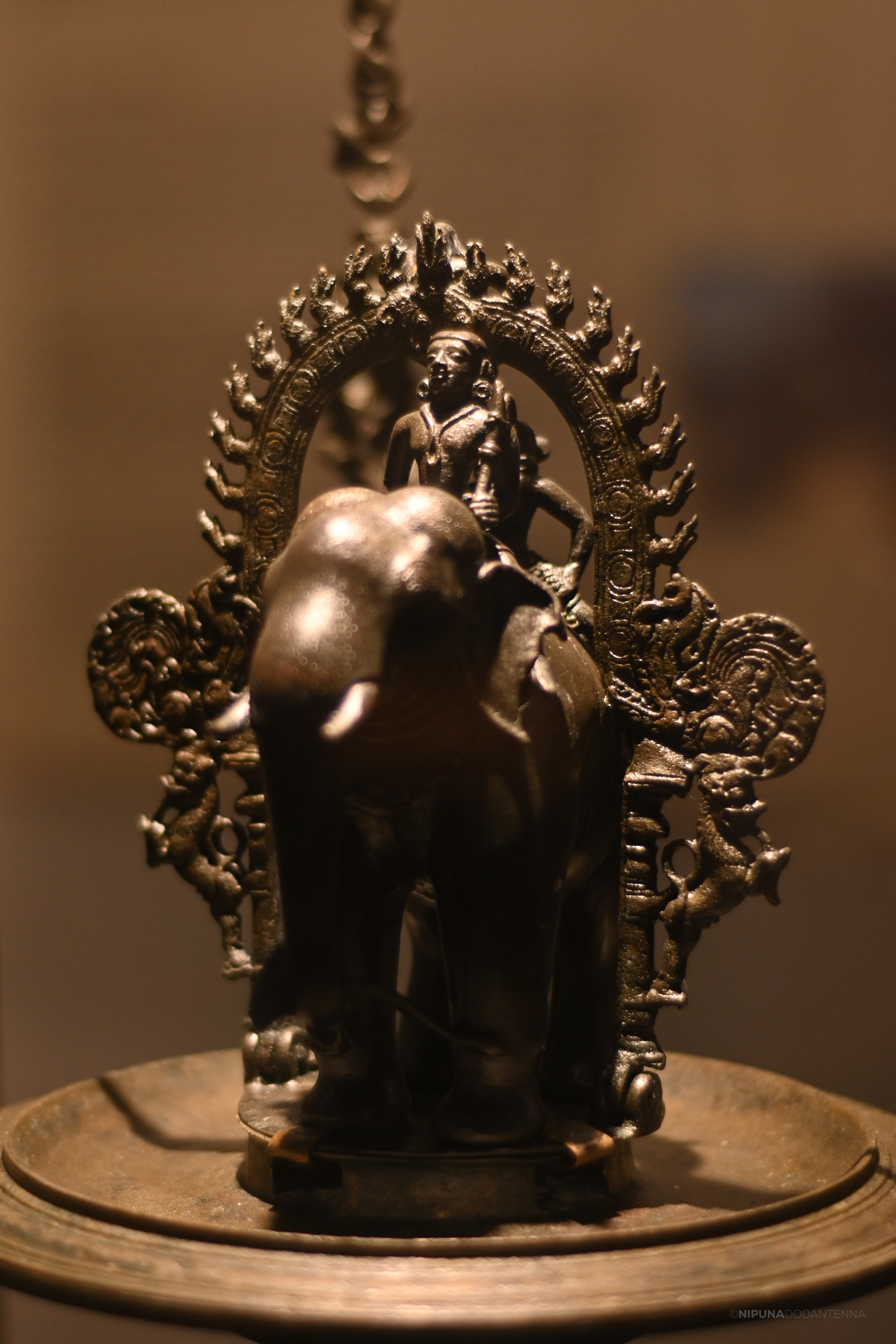
Dedigama Elephant Lamp at Colombo National Museum

In 1982 Dr. Thelma Gunawardena became the first woman director of the National Museum of Colombo. She served from 1982 through 1994.

From 1972 to 1991, Prof. Pandula Andagama was the assistant director of the Department of Anthropology in the museum, and the assistant director of the National Museum.

== National Museum Library ==
The Colombo National Museum Library was also established on 1 January 1877 incorporating the Government Oriental Library that had been established in 1870. Since 1885, by law, a copy of every document printed in the country is required to be lodged with the museum library.

== See also ==
- Galle Trilingual Inscription
- 2012 Colombo museum robbery
