= Temple of the Tooth Museum =

Museum in Kandy, Sri Lanka

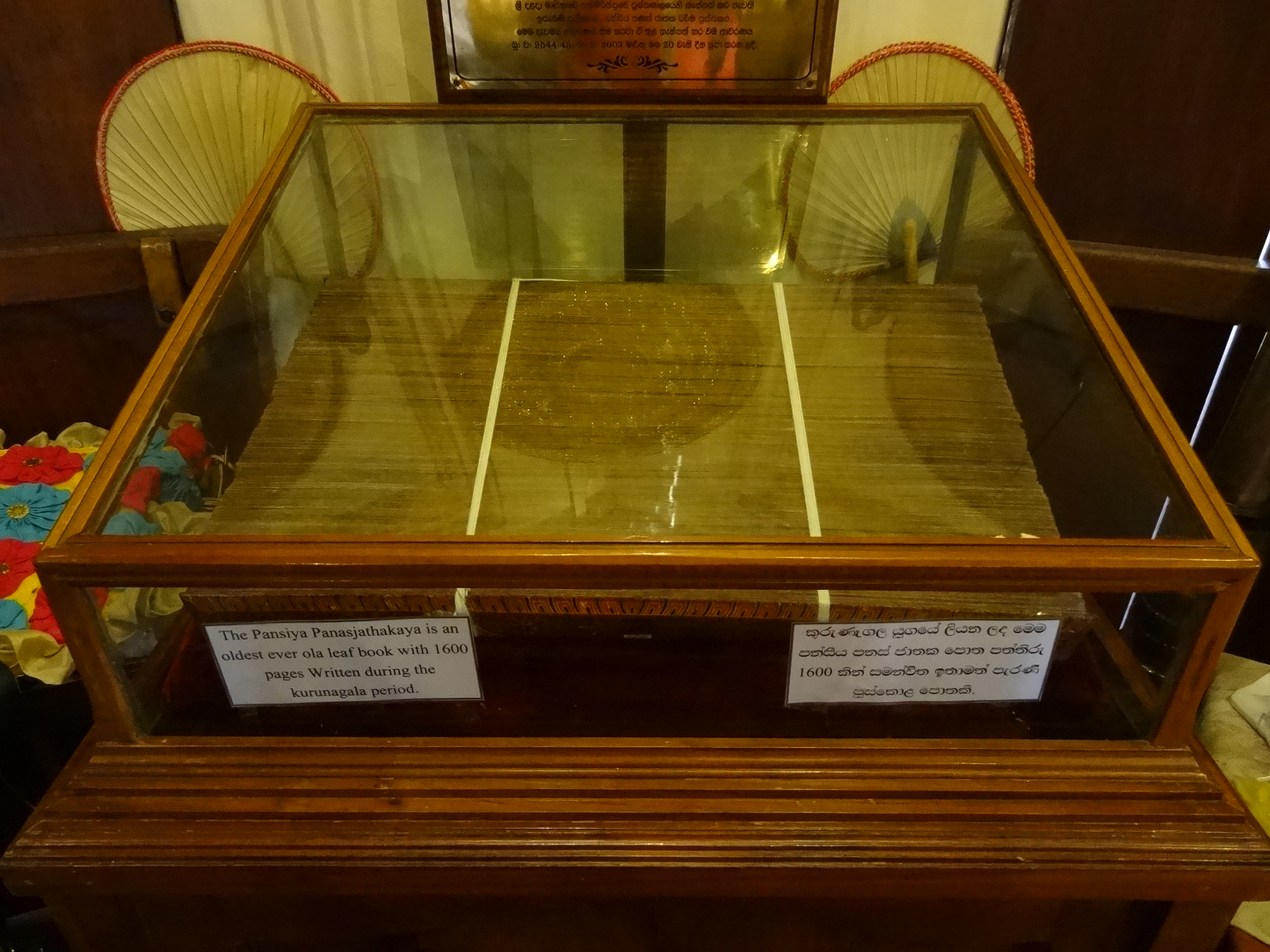
- Pansiya Panas Jathakaya, literary work during Kingdom of Dambadeniya
- Location: Kandy, Sri Lanka
- Coordinates: 7°17′38″N 80°38′19″E
- Type: Religion & history
- Website: Sri Dalada Maligawa

Temple of the Tooth Museum (simply known as Sri Dalada Museum) is a museum of the Temple of the Tooth. It is located on the first and the second floors wing of the Temple of the Tooth in Kandy, Sri Lanka.

The first floor has historical records, lists of the Chief Prelates, lists of Kandyan Kings and the portrait busts, etc. The second floor has historical artifacts and religious items such as caskets, statues jewelries, etc. It has notable items such as silver water pot offered by king Kirti Sri Rajasimha, silver hanging lamp offered by king Rajadhi Rajasimha, painted replica of Buddha’s Foot Print sent by king Borom Kot of Thailand and unique Relic Casket containing bodily relics of the great Thera Moggliputta. Also, the museum has dresses and garments of King Keerthi Sri Rajasinha including king's head cover, chest piece (Manthe), Karavaniya (cotton cloth wear over the trouser), cotton shirt, Saravale (trouser) and handkerchief.

== See also ==
- List of museums in Sri Lanka
