= Folk Museum (Anuradhapura) =

Anuradhapura Folk Museum
- Established: August 22, 1971
- Location: Anuradhapura, Sri Lanka
- Coordinates: 8.2057°N 80.2339°E
- Type: Archaeological / Folk
- Website: https://www.archaeology.gov.lk

Anuradhapura Folk Museum is a folk museum of Sri Lanka. It is situated near the Anuradhapura Archaeological Museum. The museum was established on August 22, 1971.

The museum serves to exhibit objects that used by the folk community of Sri Lanka and reflecting the lifestyle of the rural peasantry that gradually transits to modern style. the folk museum has variety of traditional objects such tools of cultivation, kitchen utensils, medical equipment, musical items, etc.

== Opening hours ==
The museum is open from 9.00 to 17.00 hrs. It is closed on Monday and every public Holidays.

== See also ==
- List of museums in Sri Lanka
