= Economic History Museum =

Museum in Sri Lanka

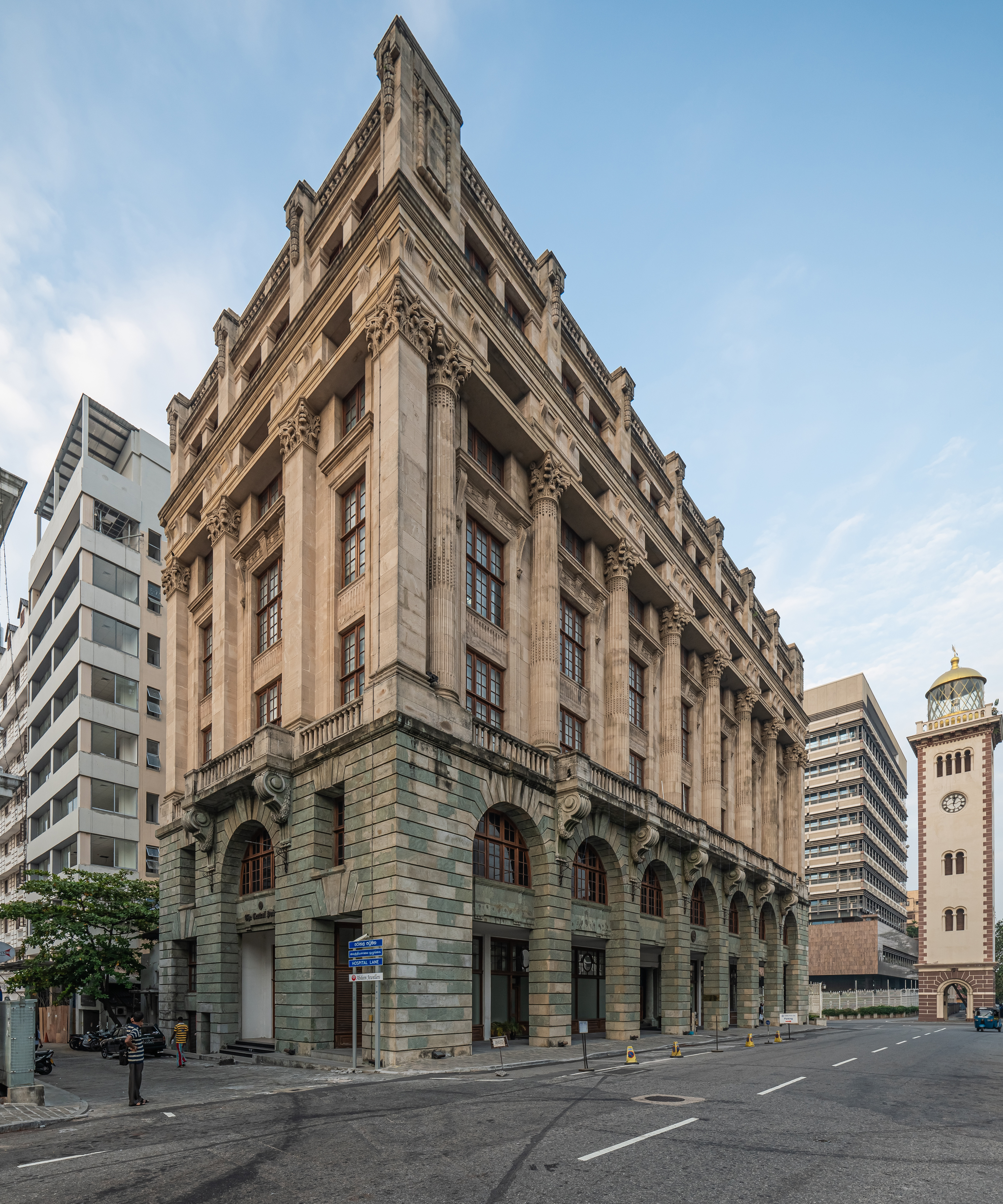

- Location in central Colombo
- Established: 2013
- Location: 54 Chatham Street, Colombo, Sri Lanka
- Coordinates: 6°56′04.3″N 79°50′35.0″E
- Type: Currency
- Website: Museum website

Economic History Museum of Sri Lanka (commonly known as the Currency museum or Money museum) is located in the Central Point building, 54 Chatham Street, Colombo Fort (the head office of Central Bank of Sri Lanka).

== Building ==
Construction of the building commenced in 1911, with the laying of its foundation stone. The National Mutual Building was opened in 1914, as the Colombo head office of a global insurance company, National Mutual Life Association of Australasia Limited. At the time of its opening it was the tallest building in Colombo. It was designed in a Greco-Roman architectural style, with a colonnade of Corinthian columns at the building's entrance. It has a circular glass dome with a tapering central atrium that lets light into the circular inner halls throughout all seven floors and features the tallest chandelier in Asia.

The building was extensively damaged in the 1996 attack by the Liberation Tigers of Tamil Eelam on the Colombo Central Bank.

In 2011 the building was acquired by the Central Bank of Sri Lanka (CBSL), who undertook extensive renovations and refurbishment, in order to house the museum. The Economic History Museum of Sri Lanka was formally opened in 2013. The CSBL also renamed the building to the Central Point building, reflecting its central location within Colombo.

== Museum ==
The museum has a collection of currency which date back to the 3rd century BC. It includes coins from the Anuradhapura era (3 BC to 107 AD), Polonnaruwa to Kotte Kingdoms era (1017 AD - 1597 AD), coins used during the Portuguese, Dutch and British colonial eras through to the modern era and commemorative coins and notes.

== Other banking museums ==
National Savings Bank, Bank of Ceylon, People's Bank and Hatton National Bank also have their small museums in Colombo. However, the currency museum of Central Bank of Sri Lanka exhibits more information.

== See also ==
- List of museums in Sri Lanka
