= Independence Memorial Museum =

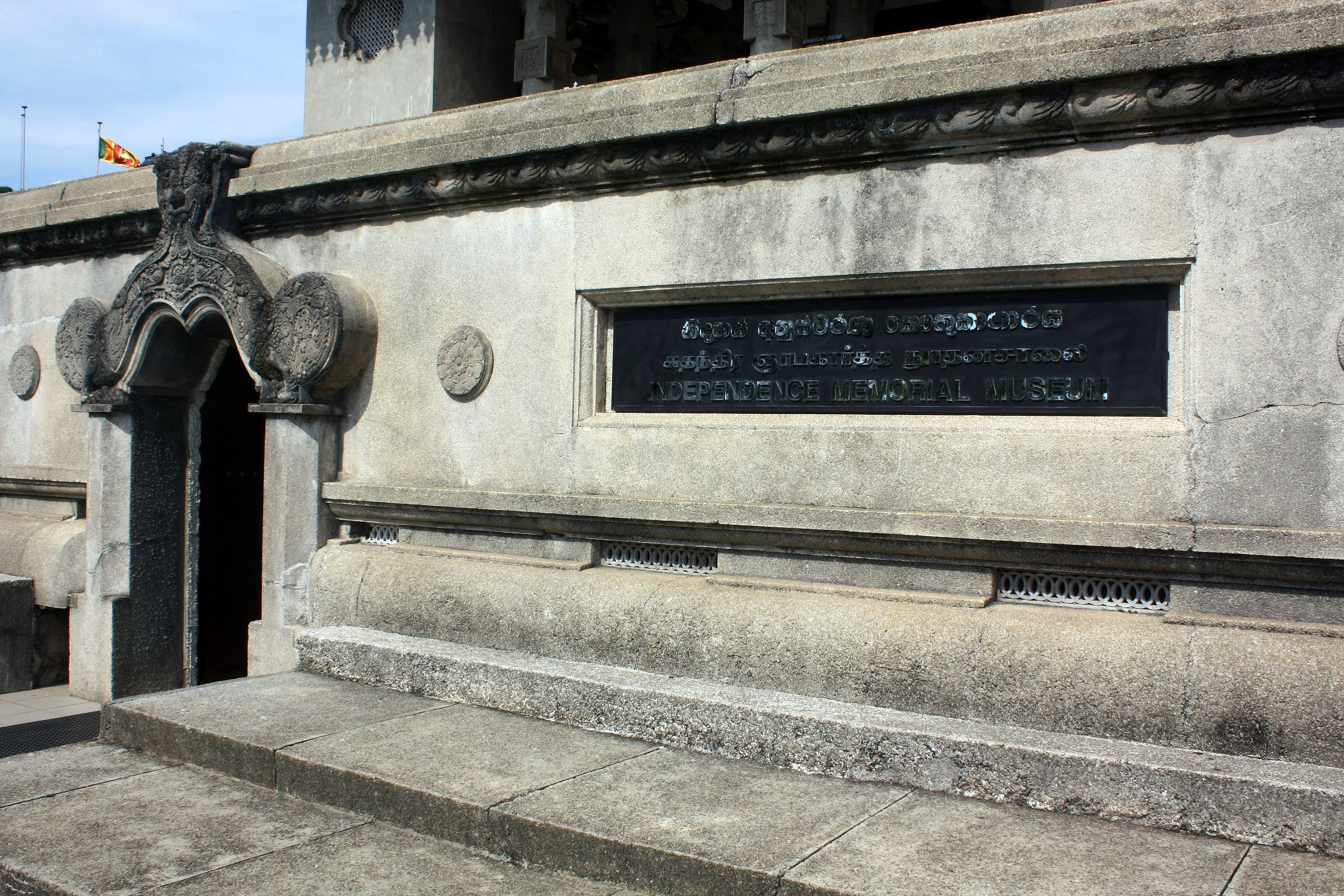
- Entrance of Independence Memorial Museum in the basement of the Independence Memorial Hall

- Location in greater Colombo
- Established: 2008
- Location: Colombo, Sri Lanka
- Coordinates: 6°54′16.5″N 79°52′02.2″E
- Website: www.museum.gov.lk

Independence Memorial Museum in Colombo, Sri Lanka is located in the basement of the Independence Memorial Hall, Independence Square (formally Torrington Square) in the Cinnamon Gardens. It is maintained by the Department of National Museum. The museum was established with the objective honouring national heroes who were instrumental in the country gaining independence from the British Rule. The Museum has a series of busts, display boards depicting the names, images and information of the political leaders, clergy and the lay patriots who were at the centre of the struggle for independence.

== See also ==
- List of museums in Sri Lanka
