= National Museum of Natural History, Colombo =

Museum in Colombo, Sri Lanka

National Museum of Natural History
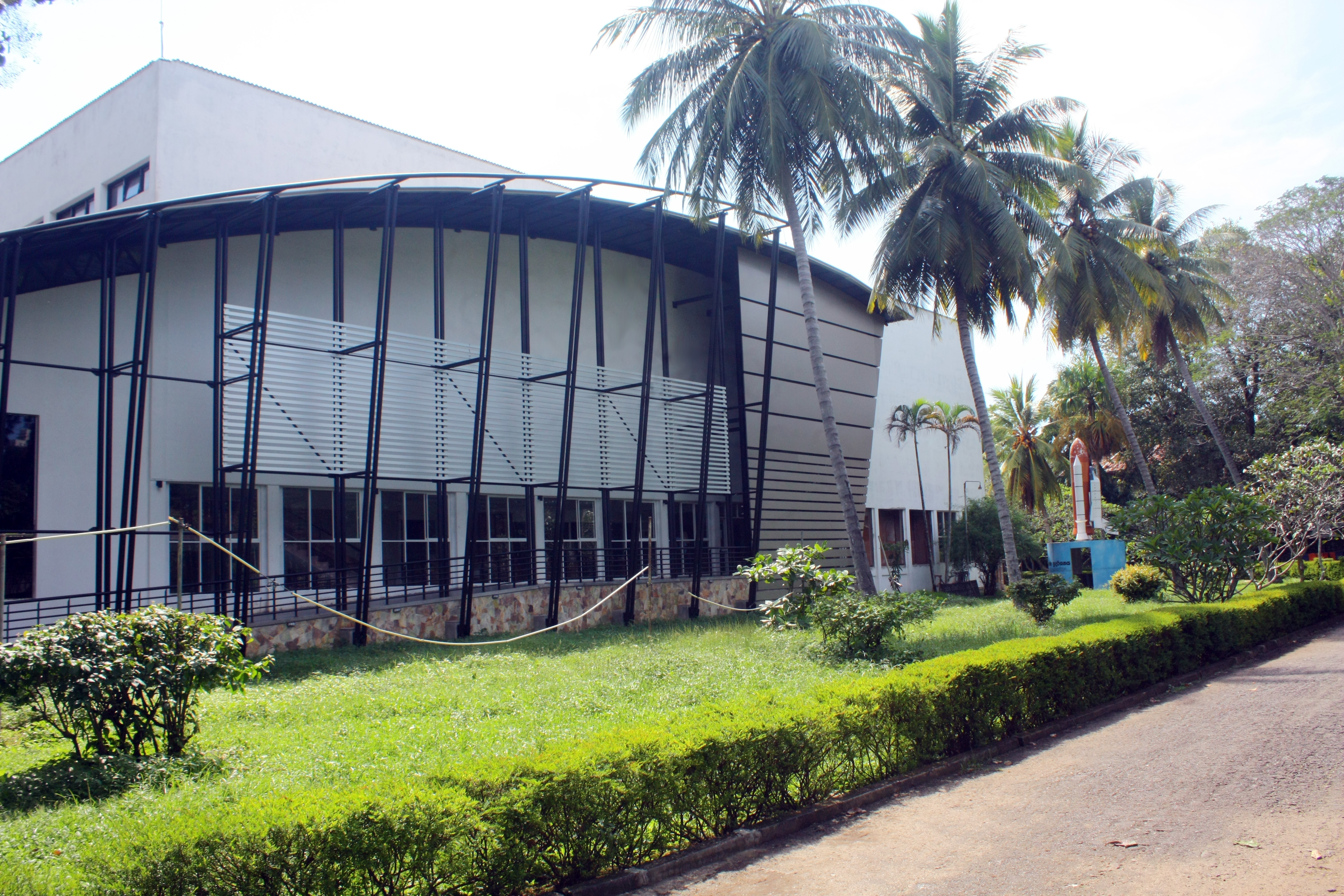
- Front view of National Museum of Natural History

- Location in greater Colombo
- Established: 1986
- Location: Colombo, Sri Lanka
- Coordinates: 6°54′40.3″N 79°51′39.9″E
- Type: Natural History
- Website: Department of National Museums website

The National Museum of Natural History (Sinhala: ජාතික ස්වාභාවික විද්‍යා කෞතුකාගාරය, romanized: Jātika Svābhāvika Vidyā Kautukāgāraya, Tamil: தேசிய இயற்கை வரலாறு நூதனசாலை, கொழும்பு, romanized: Tēciya Iyaṟkai Varalāṟu Nūtaṉacālai, Koḻumpu) is a museum that covers the natural heritage of Sri Lanka. The museum is located closer to the National Museum of Colombo. It was established on September 23, 1986, and became only one museum in Sri Lanka that represents natural history and natural heritage.

The National Museum of Natural History exhibits rare and threatened with extinction such as natural heritage of plant and animal species endemic to Sri Lanka, over 5,000 specimens of mammals, jurassic period indigenous fossils and various kinds of geological rocks.

== See also ==
- List of museums in Sri Lanka
