= Sri Lanka Cricket Museum =

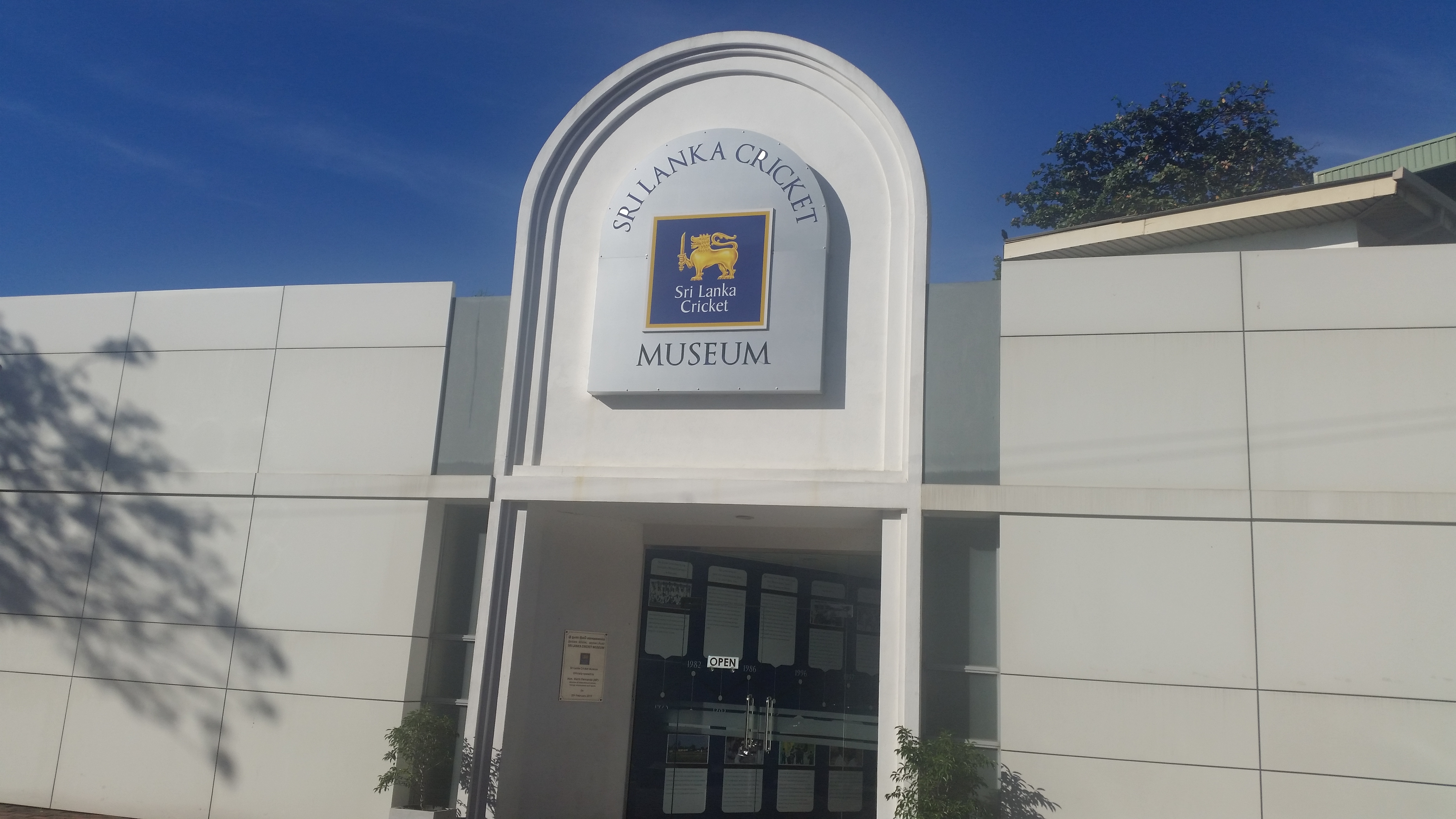
- Established: 20 February 2019; 7 years ago
- Location: 35 Maitland Place, Colombo, Sri Lanka
- Coordinates: 6.905935°N 79.868434°E

Sri Lanka Cricket Museum is located at Maitland Place, Colombo, Sri Lanka, at the former Asian Cricket Council headquarters, adjacent to the headquarters of Sri Lanka Cricket.

It was officially opened by Minister of Sports Harin Fernando on 20 February 2019 and is operated by Sri Lanka Cricket.

The Sri Lanka Cricket Museum covers the history of cricket in the country. The museum documents the country's journey towards becoming a test nation and its achievements made during the pre and post test era. It includes a 'Hall of Fame', as well as significant cricketing ‘moments’ and ‘turning points’ in Sri Lanka's cricketing history. The gallery contains the 1996 World Cup trophy and the 2014 T20 World Cup trophy.
