= National Museum of Kandy =

Museum in Kandy, Sri Lanka

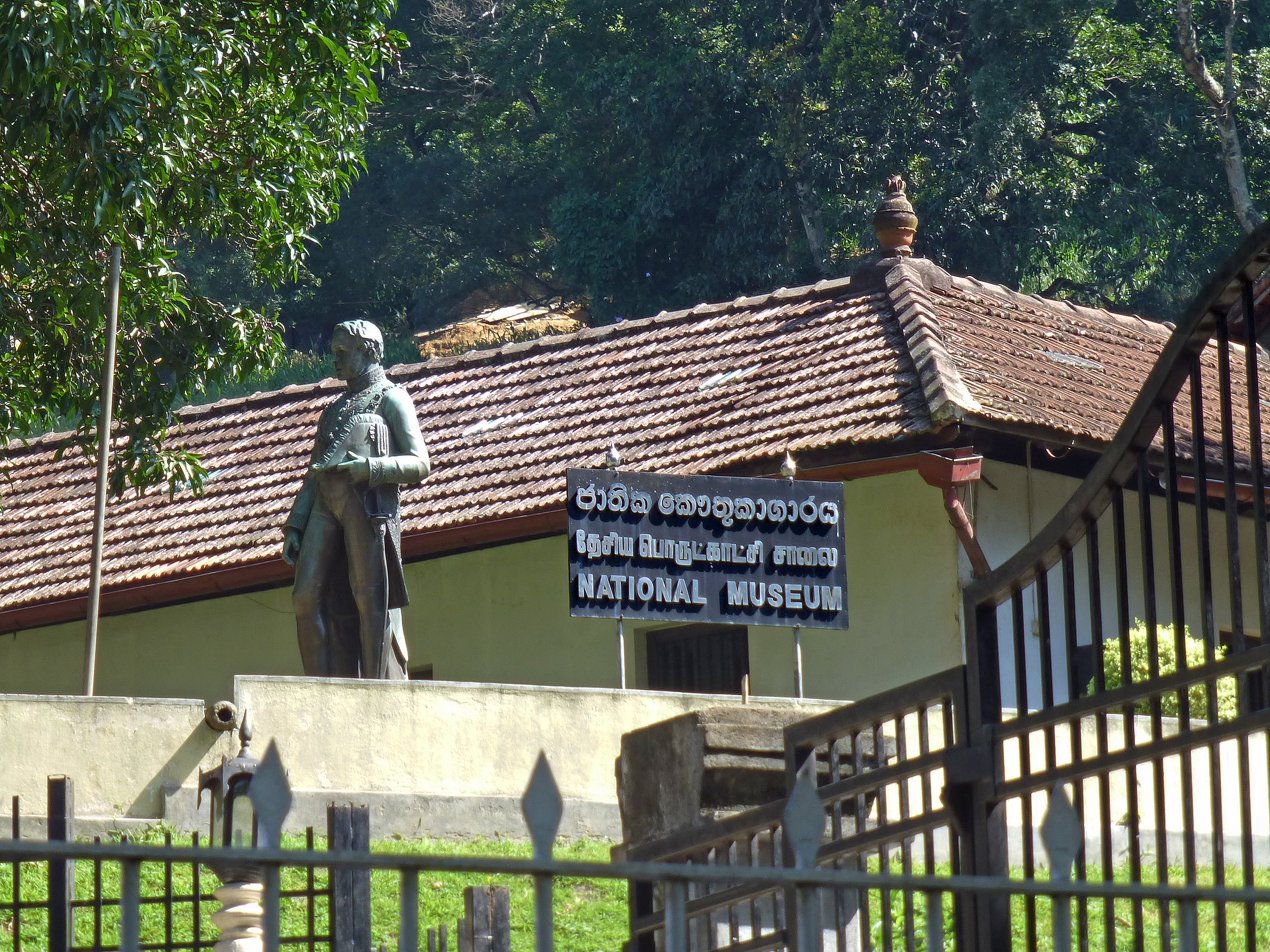
- National Museum in Kandy, with the statue of Sir Henry Ward in the foreground.
- Established: 1942
- Location: Kandy, Sri Lanka
- Coordinates: 7°17′41″N 80°38′27″E
- Type: History
- Director: K. D. V. Chandimal
- Website: Department of National Museums website

The National Museum of Kandy in Kandy, Sri Lanka is located next to the Temple of the Tooth in part of the former Royal Palace of Kandy. The primary exhibits are housed in the Palle Vahala building, which was the former home of the King's harem. A secondary exhibition is located in the main palace building. The museum is maintained by the Department of National Museums.

The Palle Vahala (lower palace) or Meda Vahala (middle palace) was constructed during the Sri Vickrama Rajasingha era and was used as the quarters of the queens of King of Kandy. This building has been built according to the architectural features of Kandyan period. It was used as a depository for historical artifacts made by the Kandy Art Association which was established in 1882 and artisans of Matale. The museum was opened to the public in 1942.

The museum has over 5,000 artifacts on display consist of weapons, jewelry, tools and other artifacts from the Kandian era (17-19th Century) and post British Colonial era, including a copy of the 1815 agreement that handed over the Kandyan provinces to the British. In the grounds of the museum is a statue of Sir Henry Ward a former Governor of Ceylon (1855–1860), which was originally located in front of the Queen's Hotel.

== See also ==
- Royal Palace of Kandy
- List of museums in Sri Lanka
- 1961 Kandy museum robbery
