= Anuradhapura Museum =

Coordinates: 8.3473°N 80.3936°E

Anuradhapura Archaeological Museum
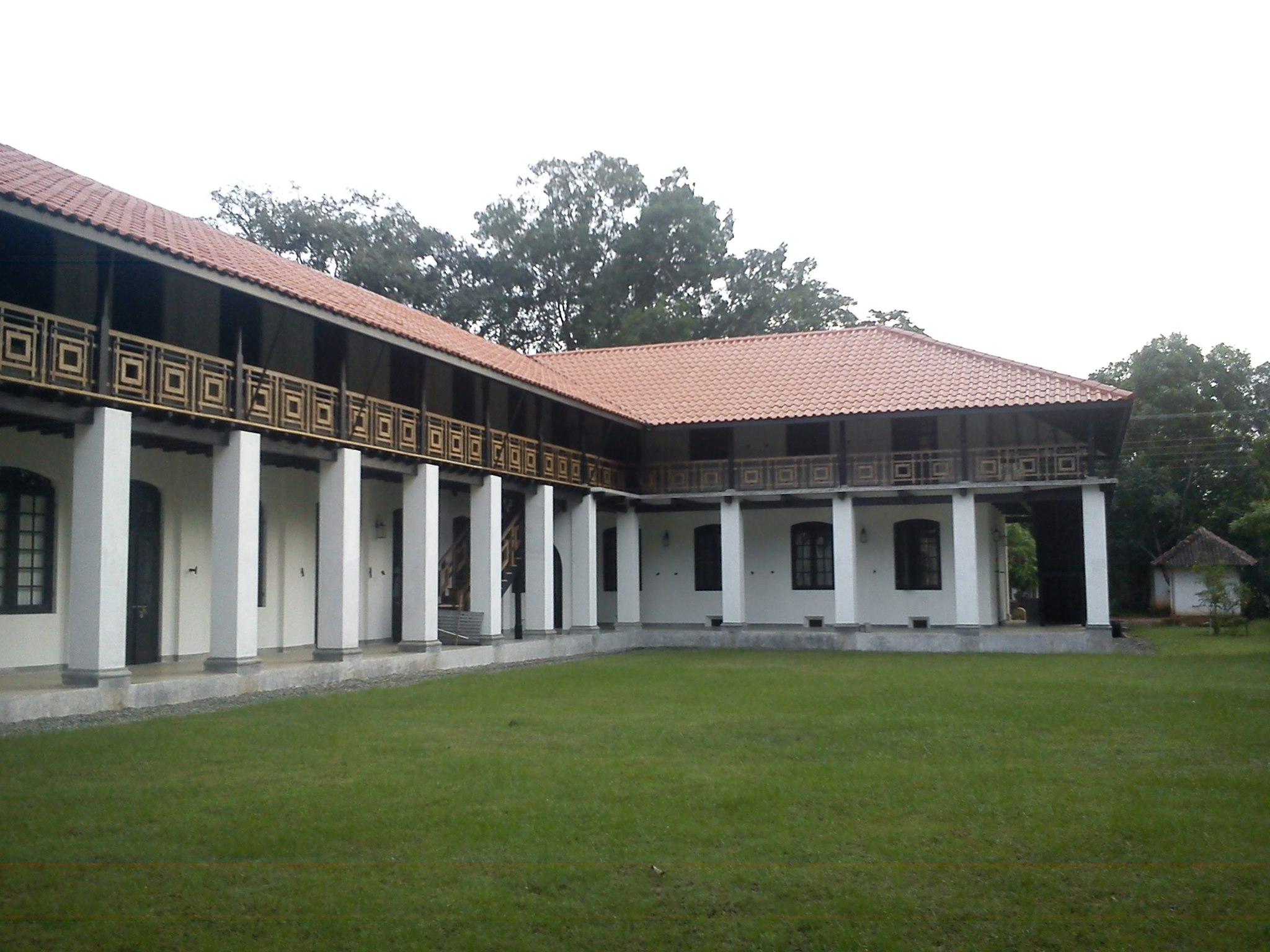
- side view of the museum
- Former name: Puravidu Bhavana (පුරාවිදු භවන)
- Established: 7 July 1947; 77 years ago
- Location: Archaeological Museum, Anuradhapura, Sri Lanka
- Type: Archaeological Museum, Historical Museum
- Founder: Senarath Paranavithana
- Website: http://www.archaeology.gov.lk

Anuradhapura Archaeological Museum (also known as Puravidu Bhavana) is the oldest and the largest museum belonging to the Department of Archaeology of Sri Lanka.

== Location ==
The museum is located near the Ruwanwalisaya Stupa, adjacent to the Anuradhapura Presidential House in the Anuradhapura District, North Central Province, Sri Lanka.

== History ==
The museum is one of the archaeological museums of Sri Lanka. It is situated in the old administration building (පරණ කච්චේරි ගොඩනැගිල්ල), in the sacred city of Anuradhapura.

Earlier, the Department of Archaeology had a residual collection of artifacts and Dr. Senarath Paranavithana started recording these artifacts according to the orders of the Archaeological Commissioner, Arthur Maurice Hocart. This museum was initially maintained in a part of a hospital located near Sri Maha Bodiya and Ruwanwalisa in Anuradhapura. But later on due to lack of facilities, Paranavithana constantly insisted on the necessity of establishing the museum in a new place.

According to the reports, in 1948, this collection of goods, which was kept on the south side of the Anuradhapura department building, was organised as a museum with the contribution of S. Shan Muganathan and G. D. Ranasinghe.

According to this request, the government gave the old administration building (පරණ කච්චේරි ගොඩනැගිල්ල) in Anuradhapura for the establishment of the Archaeological Museum. The establishment of the museum was delayed because the building was functioning as a centre to accommodate the Anuradhapura flood victims in the 1940s.

Accordingly, with the help of Nisshanka Wijeratne, who was the Anuradhapura Governor at that time, the museum was able to acquire two buildings from this grant building and the adjoining two-storey recording building. Officially, Anuradhapura Archaeological Museum was established under the prime effort of former Director General, Dr. Senarath Paranavithana.

== Collection ==
The museum is used to exhibit antiquities found from various regions of Sri Lanka such as Buddha statues, Relic caskets, drawings, puppets, coins, jewelries, Beads and other miscellaneous things. Among these antiquities there is a model of the Abhayagiri Stupa, Jantāgara and Paṁcāvāsa building etc. Also Anuradhapura Archaeological museum holds the largest Inscription collection of Sri Lanka.

== See also ==
- List of museums in Sri Lanka
