= Archaeological Museum, Jaffna =

Jaffna Archaeological Museum
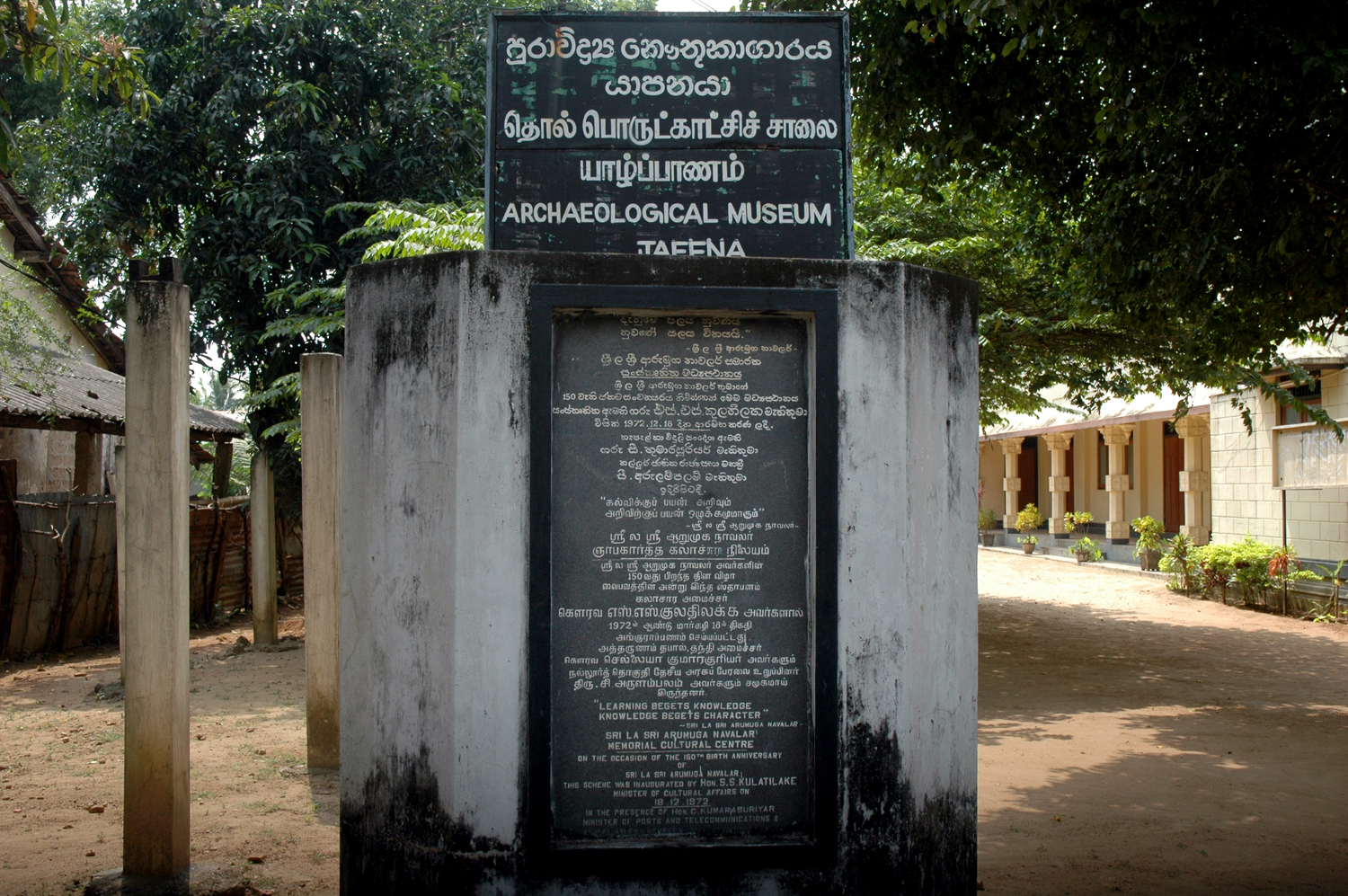
- Stone Plaque at the entrance

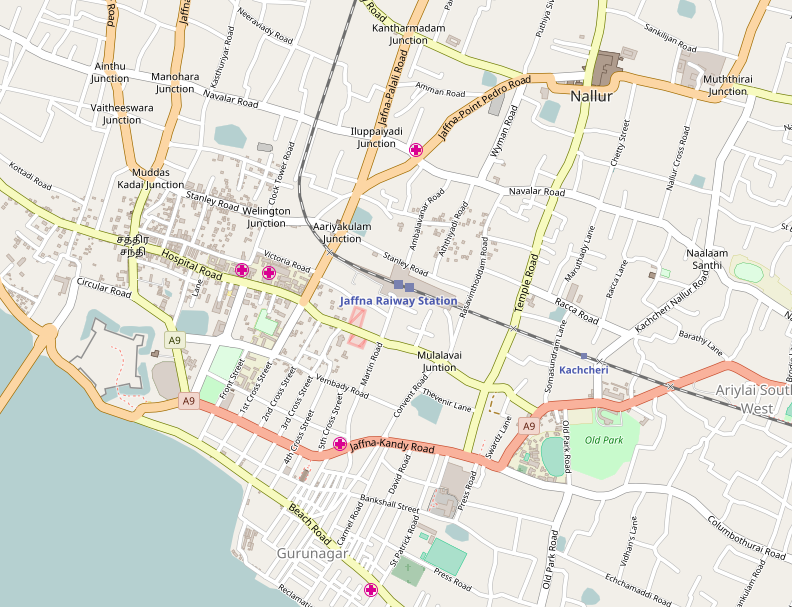
- Location in central Jaffna
- Established: 1978
- Location: Jaffna, Sri Lanka
- Coordinates: 9°40′7.89″N 80°1′27.34″E
- Type: History
- Website: http://www.archaeology.gov.lk

Jaffna Archaeological Museum is located in Nallur, Jaffna, Sri Lanka. The land was given to museum by Arumuga Navalar Foundation, and front portion has Navalar Cultural Hall. The museum houses a rare collection of antiquities. Buddhist and Hindu religious collection are in big collection, which are in various forms of metal, wood and stone. The excellent collections begin in time from the period of ancient period Sri Lanka to the colonial era. Also, some of the archaeological excavations findings of Kandarodai can be seen at this museum.

== Gallery ==
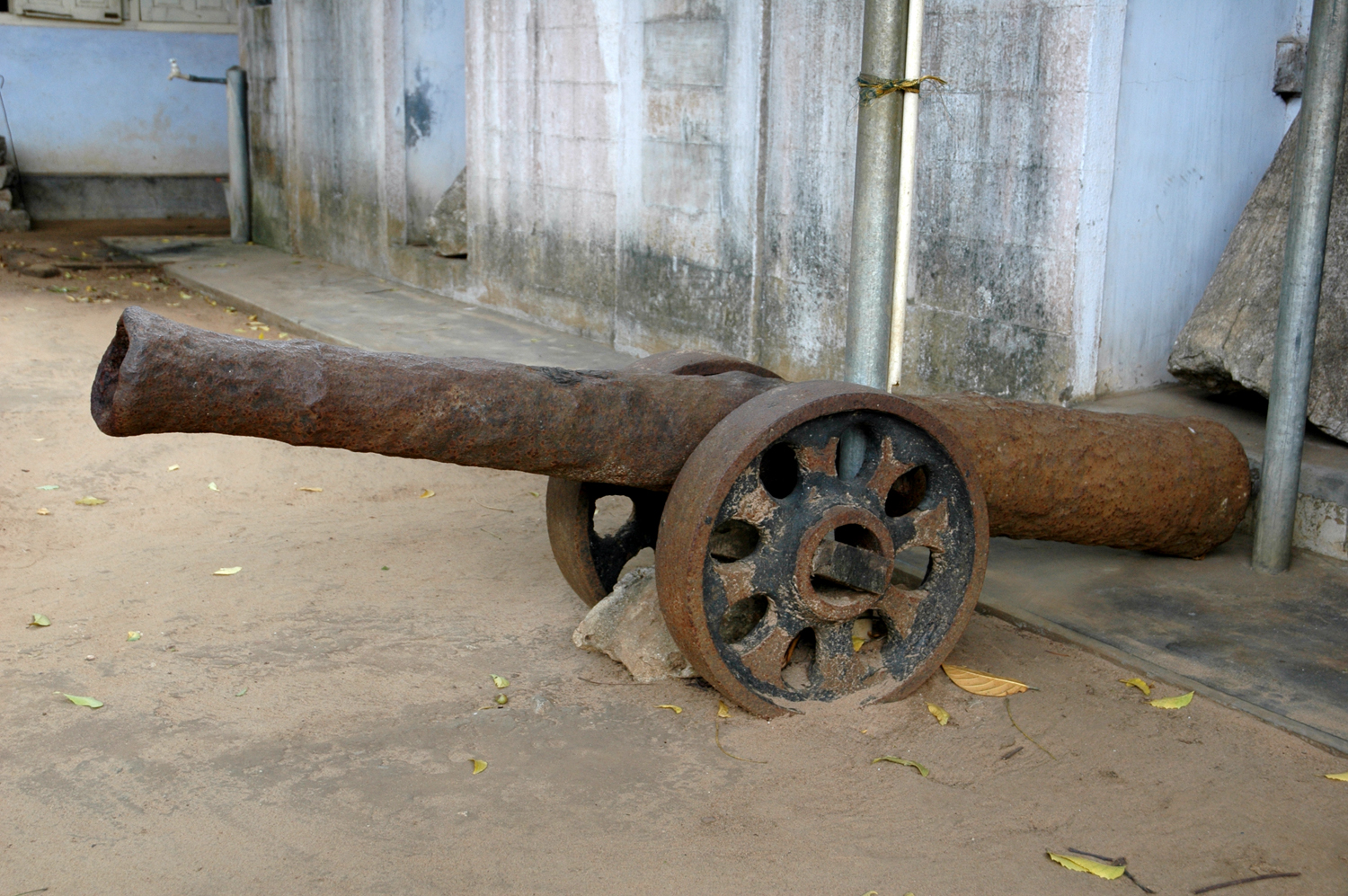
Cannon of British Ceylon

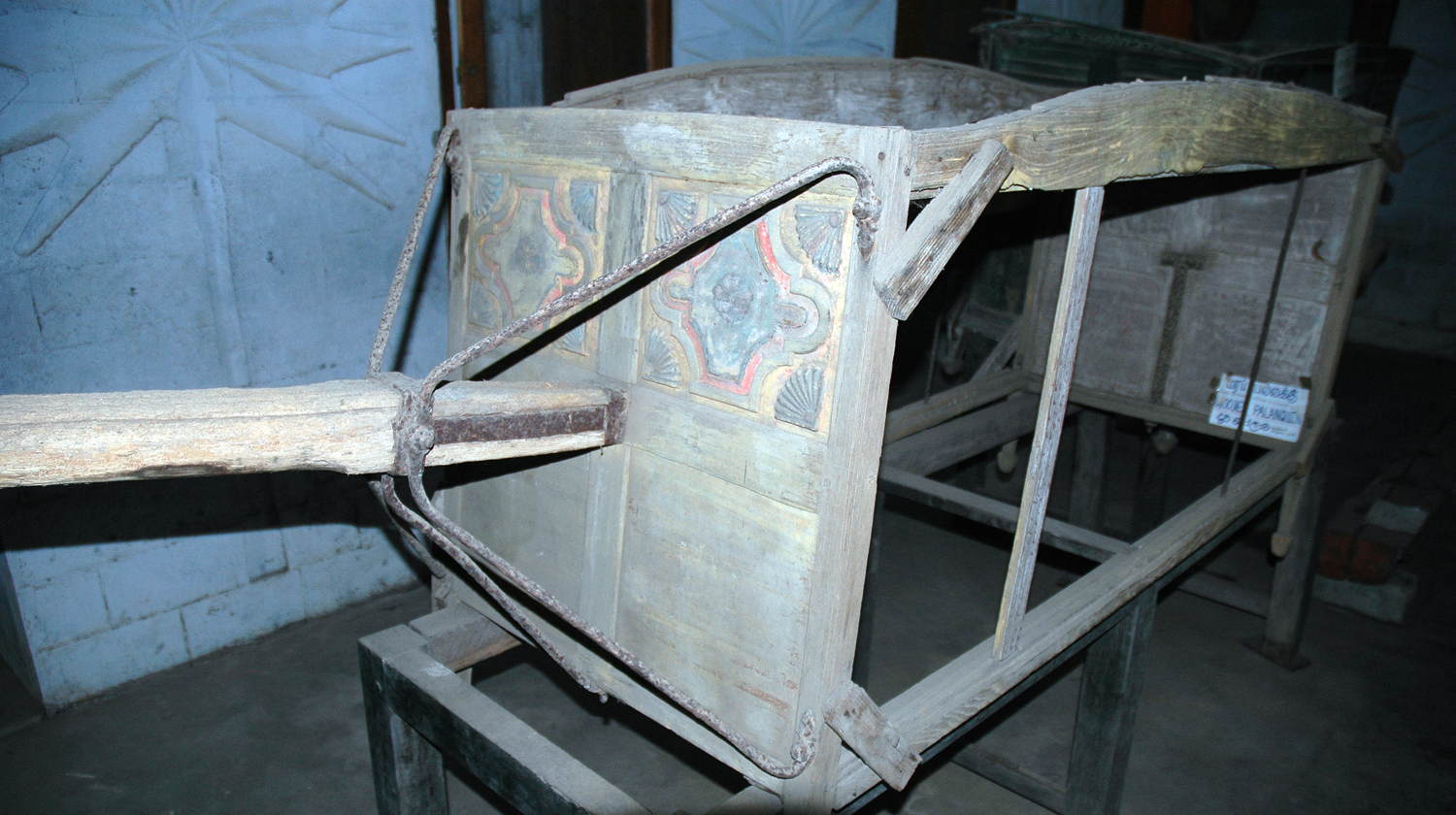
Wooden Palanquin

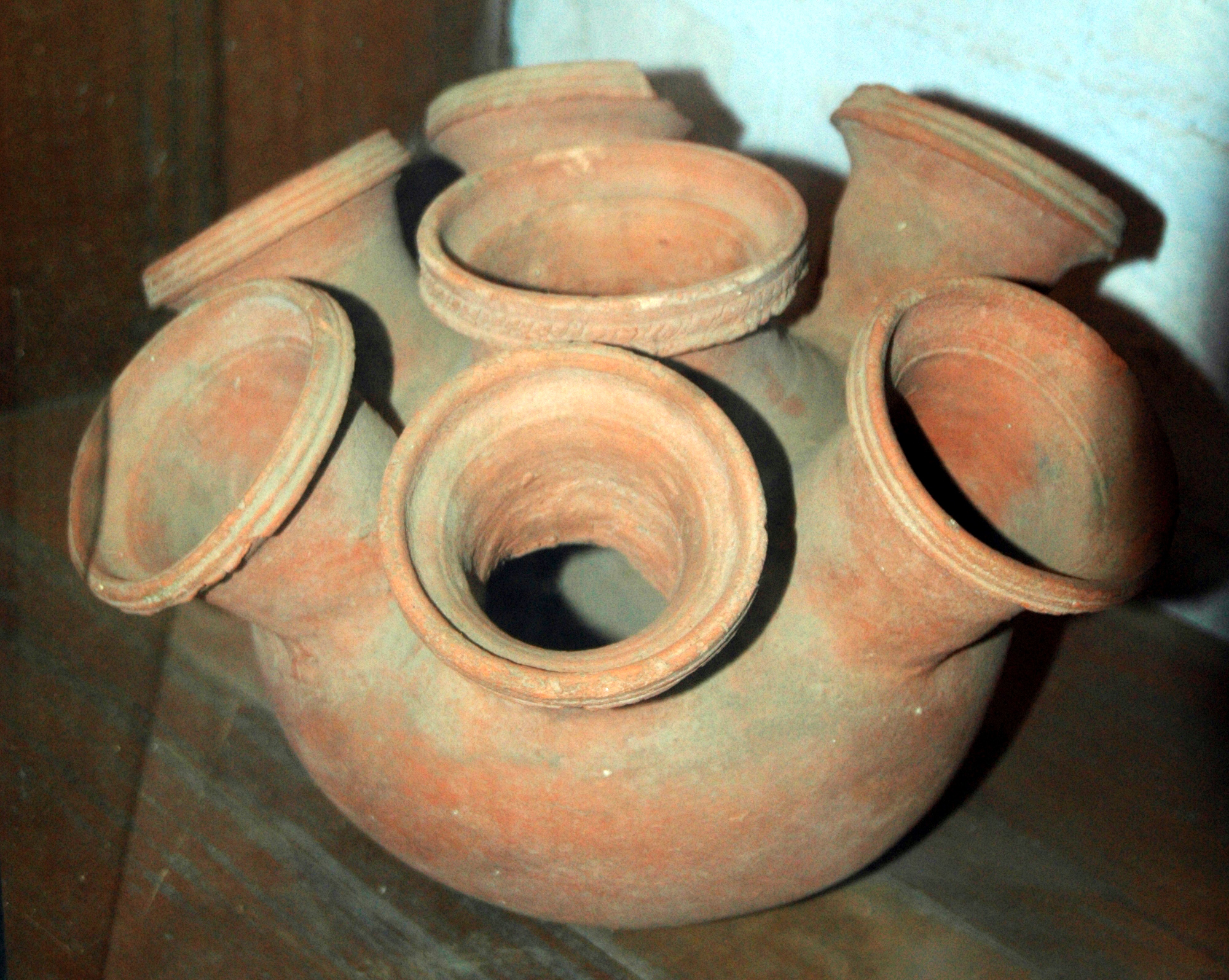
7 mouthed musical instrument pot
