= National Museum of Galle =

Museum in Galle, Sri Lanka

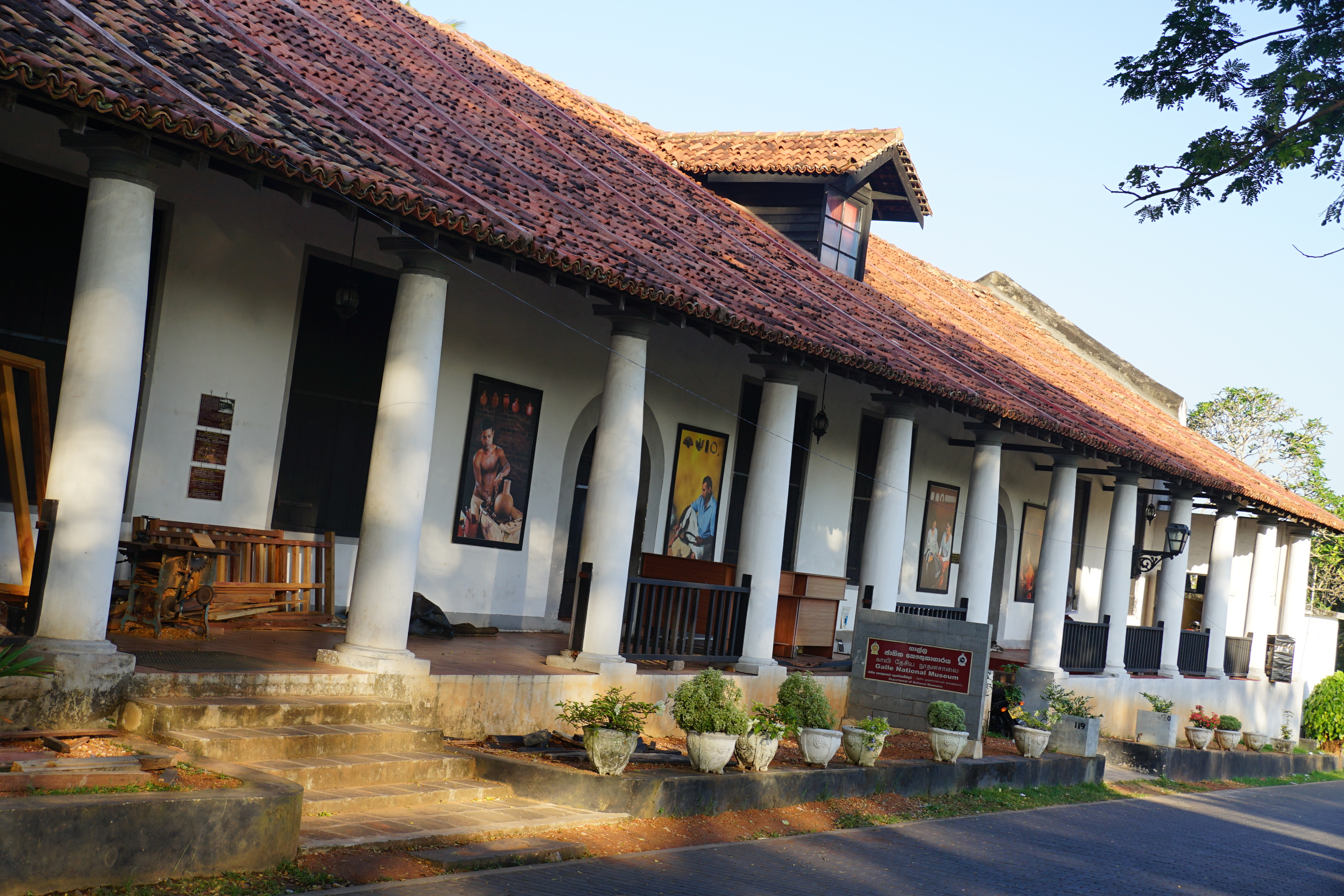
- Galle National Museum
- Established: 31 March 1986; 39 years ago
- Location: Church Street, Galle, Sri Lanka
- Coordinates: 6°01′45.4″N 80°13′00.1″E
- Type: History
- Website: Department of National Museums website

The National Museum of Galle (Galle National Museum) is one of the national museums of Sri Lanka. It is located in the oldest remaining Dutch building in the Galle fort, Galle, a single storey colonnaded Dutch building built in 1656 as the commissariat store for the Dutch garrison at the fort. It subsequently served as a billiards room for the adjoining New Oriental Hotel (now the Amangalla Hotel). The building was renovated by the Department of National Museums and opened on 31 March 1986.

The museum houses a limited collection of exhibits from the Portuguese, Dutch and British periods. It has three main galleries, the first contains collections relating to the area's cottage industries, primarily turtle shell jewellery manufacturing, Beeralu lace weaving and traditional wooden mask carving. The second contains a collection of Dutch period furniture and weaponry. The final gallery, the 'Sri Lanka China Friendship Gallery', was opened on 10 September 2013. It is dedicated to the historical and archeological evidence of trade relations between China and Sri Lanka, with displays on the Chinese Buddhist monk Faxian (337 – c. 422 CE) and the 14th Century Fleet Admiral Zheng He (1371 – 1433).

== See also ==
- National Maritime Museum (Galle)
- List of museums in Sri Lanka
