= National Museum of Ratnapura =

National museum in Sri Lanka

- Established: 13 May 1988
- Location: Colombo Road, Ratnapura, Sri Lanka
- Coordinates: 6.6844°N 80.3994°E
- Type: History
- Website: Department of National Museums website

The National Museum of Ratnapura is one of the national museums of Sri Lanka. It is located in Ratnapura, Sri Lanka and it was opened on 13 May 1988. The museum building is called “Ehelepola Walauwa”, as it once belonged to Ehelepola Nilame, a courtier of the Kingdom of Kandy, who was the 1st Adigar (1811 - 1814) under the reign of King Sri Vikrama Rajasinha, the last king of Sri Lanka, for whom he served as the Disawe (local Governor) of Ratnapura.

The museum includes exhibits on prehistoric archaeological inventions, natural heritage, geological, anthropological, zoological artifacts and models relating to the Sabaragamuwa Province. The weaponry on display include Sinhala swords of the late medieval era including a sword alleged to have belonged to Ehelepola, and a collection of old guns including a Vickers machine gun used during the First World War. The cooking utensils of the region include a tripod pan with three moulds for preparing rice flour cakes known as kiri roti. Traditional Kandyan jewellery includes necklaces, bangles, anklets and earrings. The grounds of the museum contain a palaeobiodiversity park, with life-sized animal sculptures of species believed to have existed in the region.

== See also ==
- List of museums in Sri Lanka
