= Peter Daniel Anthonisz =

Sri Lankan physician (1822–1903)

Dr Peter Daniel Anthonisz CMG, MD, FRCSEd
- Born: 25 June 1822; Galle, British Ceylon
- Died: 12 June 1903 (aged 80); Galle, British Ceylon
- Resting place: Galle Dutch Reformed Church
- Education: Bengal Medical College; St Andrews University
- Occupation: Doctor
- Employer: Ceylon Medical Department
- Parent(s): Leonardus Henricus Anthonisz, Susanna Dorothea née Deutrom

Peter Daniel Anthonisz CMG FRCSE (25 June 1822 – 12 June 1903) was a Burgher doctor who was the first Ceylonese to obtain an M.R.C.P. and F.R.C.S. He was also the inaugural president of the Ceylon Branch of the British Medical Association and a member of the Legislative Council for nine years.

== Biography ==
Peter Daniel Anthonisz was born on 25 June 1822 in Galle, the first son of ten children, to Leonardus Henricus Anthonisz (1796–1845), the Chief Clerk of the Galle Customs, and Susanna Dorothea née Deutrom (1805–1872). In 1838 at the age of sixteen he was appointed as a medical sub-assistant at the Military Hospital in Galle. The following year he was sent to study at the Bengal Medical College in Calcutta, returning in 1843. In the 1850s he worked as a physician at the Military Hospital in Colombo (his patients included the Governor Sir William Henry Gregory). In June 1856 he travelled to England, where he obtained an M.R.C.P. (Membership of the Royal College of Physicians, London) and was elected a Fellow of The Royal College of Surgeons of Edinburgh (FRCSEd) on 1 April 1857. He returned to Ceylon in 1858, where in August he was appointed to as the Colonial Surgeon of the Southern Province, a post he remained at until 1880. During this period he travelled to Europe, where in 1863 he received a Doctorate in Medicine from the University of St Andrews (St Andrews, Scotland). In 1881 he left to do further studies. Upon his return in 1883 he took up the position of Chief Medical Officer at Galle. Anthonisz was the first doctor to successfully undertake oesophagotomy and ovariotomy surgery in the country. His oesophagotomy was reportedly the first recorded in British medical annals.

Anthonisz served on the Galle Municipal Council (Fort Ward) and between 1886 and 1895 he represented the Burgher community on the Legislative Council, the first Burgher appointee from a non-legal background. One of his most significant achievements during his time on the Legislative Council was the realisation of the railway line between Colombo and Matara.

On 17 December 1887 he became the inaugural President of the Ceylon branch of the British Medical Association (now known as the Sri Lanka Medical Association). In November 1889 Dr Anthonisz led the local opposition against the Government's proposal to demolish the ramparts of the 17th-century Dutch fort. Anthonisz argued that the fort provided protection from monsoon tidal floods and ships at anchor in the harbour – a fact later proven with the 2004 tsunami. In 1892 he was awarded the Companion of the Order of St Michael and St George.

Anthonisz died in Galle on 12 June 1903 and is buried at the Galle Dutch Reformed Church.

== Legacy ==
The Galle Clock Tower was erected in his memory in 1883.

The 'Anthonisz Ward' at the Colombo General Hospital (now known as the 'National Hospital') is named after him.

== Bibliography ==
- Anthonisz, Peter Daniel (1887). Remarks on the Treatment of Small-pox & Elephantiasis. Ceylon Observer Press.
