= All Saints' Church, Galle =

Church building in Sri Lanka

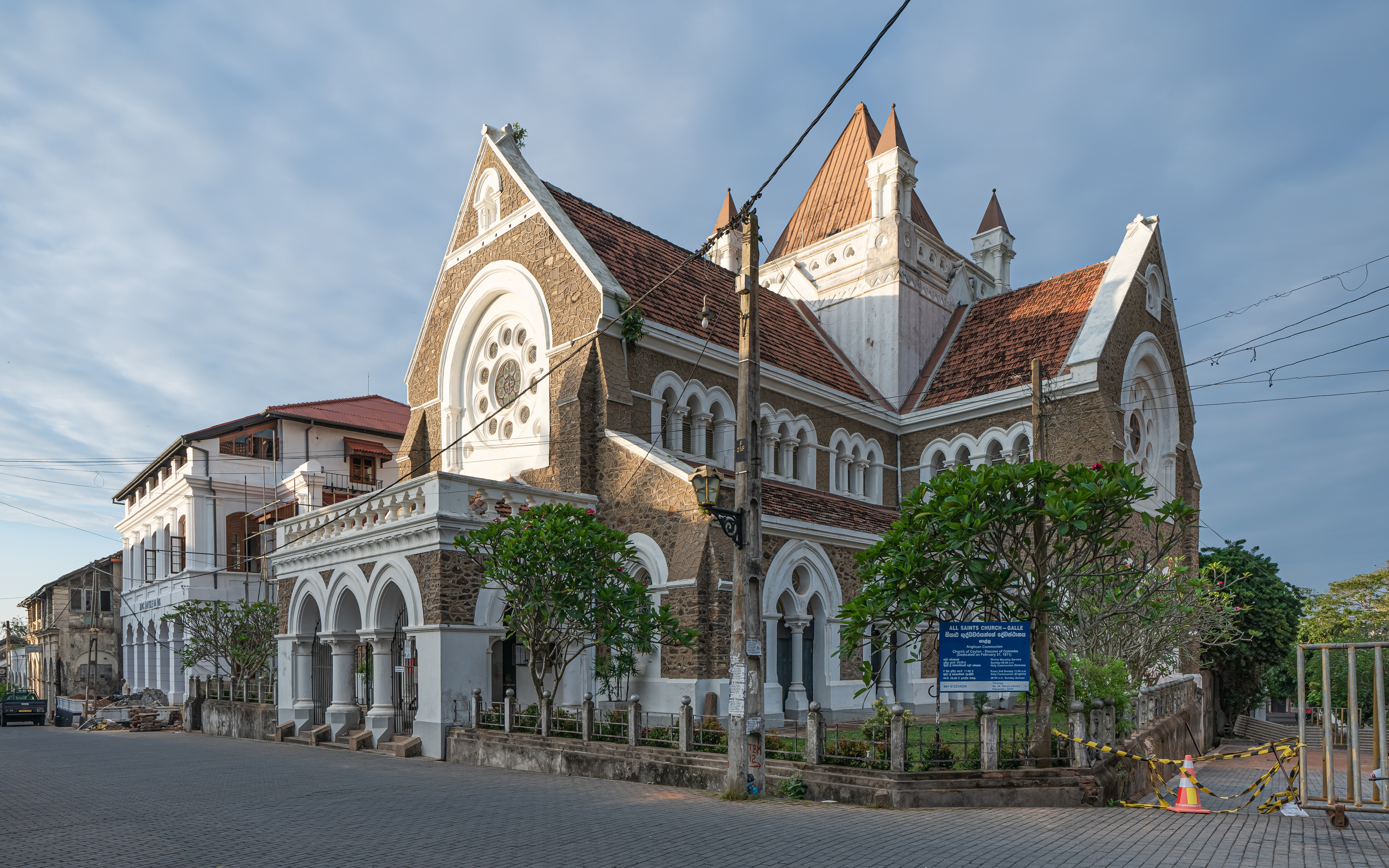

Religion
- Affiliation: Anglican, Church of Ceylon
- Rite: Anglican
- Year consecrated: 21 February 1871; 155 years ago
- Status: Active

Location
- Location: Church Street, Galle fort
- Interactive map of All Saints' Church, Galle
- Coordinates: 6°1′38″N 80°13′2″E

Architecture
- Architect: J.G. Smithers
- Type: Church
- Style: Victorian Gothic Revival
- Groundbreaking: 30 October 1868
- Completed: 21 February 1871
- Construction cost: £1,600
- Direction of façade: towards south

Website
- www.allsaintsgalle.org

All Saints' Church is an Anglican church located within the Galle fort in Galle, Sri Lanka and is located on Church Road.

== History ==
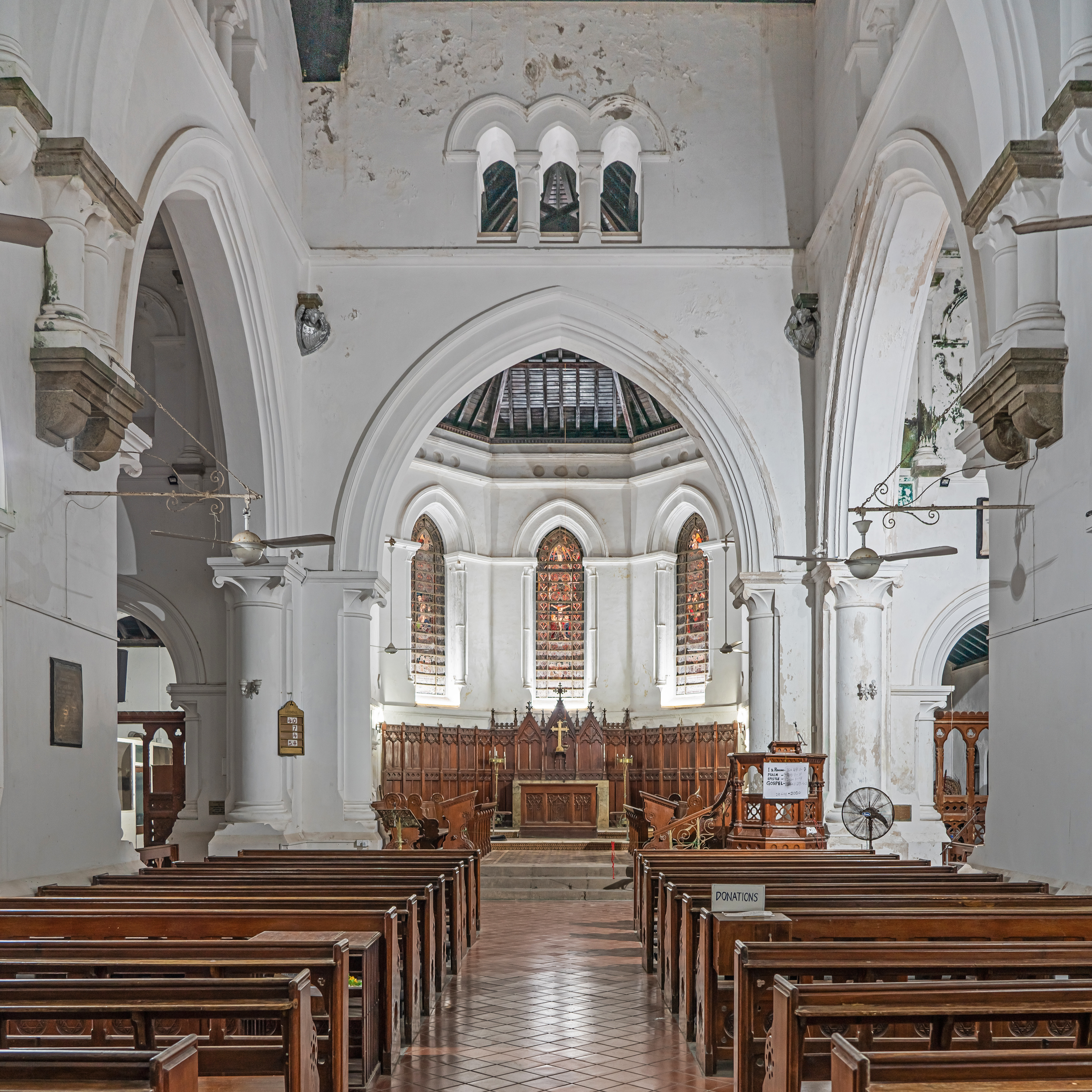
Interior of the All Saints' Church

The decision to build an Anglican church at Galle, was initiated by the first Bishop of Colombo, Rt. Rev. James Chapman. The foundation of the church was laid on 30 October 1868, by Rev. Dr. Piers Calveley Claughton, the second Bishop of Colombo. The construction of the church was facilitated by a grant of the land and £600 from the 13th Governor of Ceylon, Sir Hercules Robinson. A further £1,000 contribution was received from an English parish. The church was designed by James George Smither, the government architect, who later designed the National Museum of Colombo. The church was constructed on the site of a former Court House (1780s). The gallows it is said stood on the site of the present altar. The Anglican congregation in Galle which, up to then, worshipped in the Dutch Church. The church was consecrated on 21 February 1871 by Bishop Claughton, assisted by the church's first vicar, Rev. Dr. George Justus Schrader (1829-1875).

In recognition of Rev. Dr. Schrader's significant contribution to the church, a large bell was placed in his memory in the centre dome of the church in 1876. In the mid 1960s, for security reasons the bell was lowered and was left to be sold. It was subsequently bought by the diocese and is now housed in the Cathedral of Christ the Living Saviour in Colombo. The current bell was acquired by the church in 1968. The bell came from the Liberty Ship, "Ocean Verity", and was donated by the Clan Line Steamship Company.

The first Baptism at All Saints was Lilian Slade Godolphin Ozanne on 21 February 1871 and the first marriage was held on 25 March 1871, between James Weir and Jane Strene King.

== Architecture ==
It was built on a basilican plan in a Victorian Gothic Revival style of architecture, modified to suit local climate. The plan of the Church is cruciform firmly supported on stone columns and arches carved beautifully in timber. Masonry arches built in local kabuk and lime mortar. The heavy pews, with carvings of the Jewish Star of David, and the sanctuary are all made from Burmese teak.
