= Meeran Jumma Mosque =

Mosque in Galle, Southern, Sri Lanka

- ගාලු කොටුව මීරාන් ජුම්මා මස්ජිදය
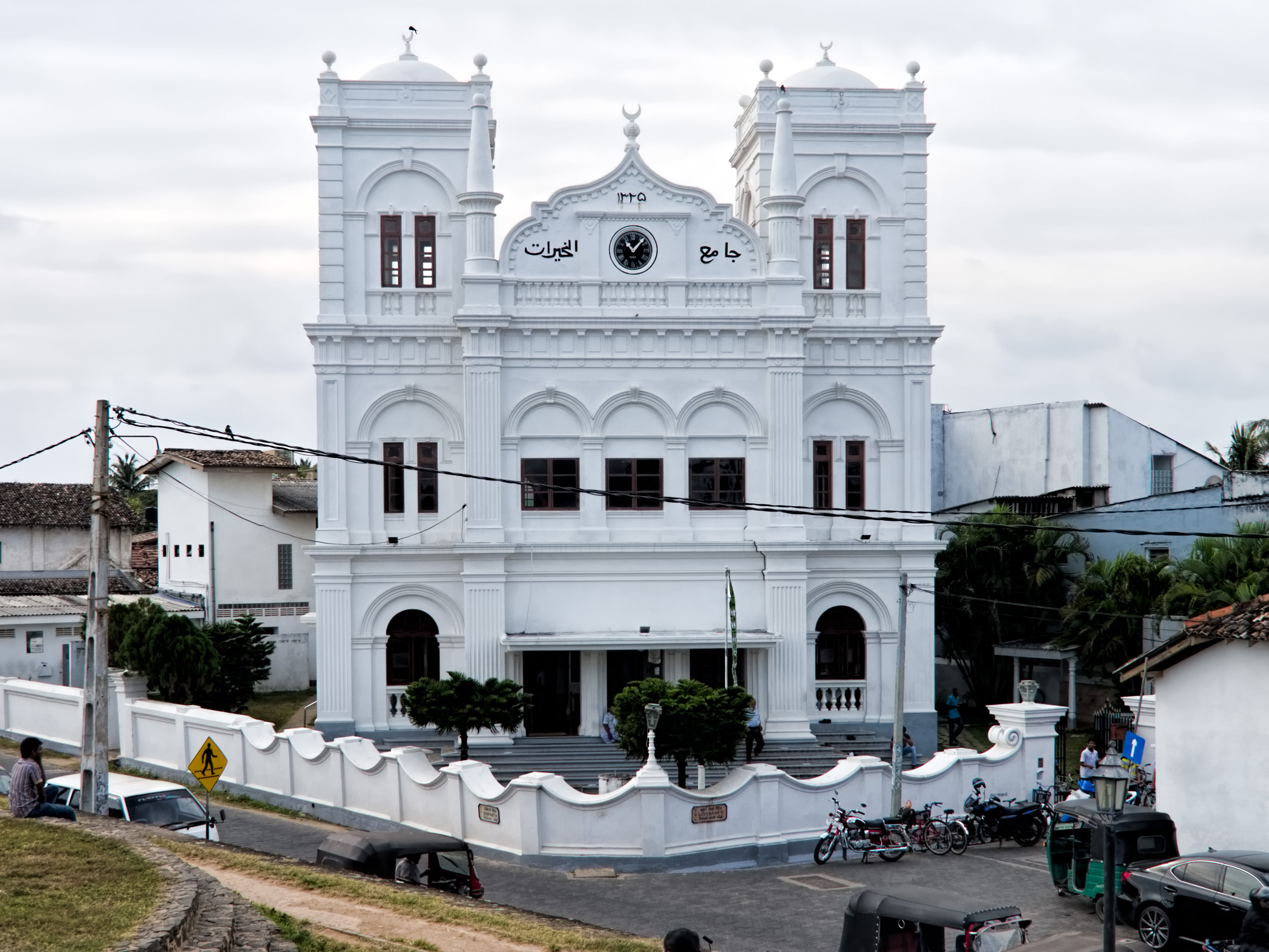

- Location within Sri Lanka

Religion
- Affiliation: Islam
- Province: Southern

Location
- Location: 90 Leyn Baan Street
- Municipality: Galle
- Country: Sri Lanka
- Interactive map of Meeran Jumma Mosque
- Coordinates: 6°01′28.7″N 80°13′07.3″E

Architecture
- Type: mosque
- Style: Baroque
- Completed: 1904

The Meeran Jumma Mosque (Sinhala: ගාලු කොටුව මීරාන් ජුම්මා මස්ජිදය), commonly known as Galle Fort Mosque, is a mosque located within Galle Fort, Southern Province, Sri Lanka.

== History ==
The current two-storey building was commissioned in 1904 by Ahamed Haji Ismail, allegedly on the site of a Portuguese catholic church. Although it is claimed that it was the original site of a mosque built in the 1750s, predating the Portuguese occupation. The numerals painted on the front wall of the mosque state the year 1325 Hijri, which supports the notion that a prayer space existed here before the 20th century.

Ismail was a devout wealthy Muslim, who also commissioned mosques in Weligama and Poruwa. The mosque is named in honour of Meeran Saheb of South India who is buried in Nagore Nagapattinam District, Tamil Nadu, India, and was widely regarded as the patron saint of sailors to and from Sri Lanka. Jumma Mosque literally means "Friday Mosque" or commonly the principal mosque.

== Architecture ==
The mosque was constructed in a mixture of Victorian/Baroque architecture styles, with Islamic detailings.

== See also ==
- Islam in Sri Lanka
- List of mosques in Sri Lanka
