= Clan House, Galle =

Stone building in Galle, Sri Lanka

Clan House
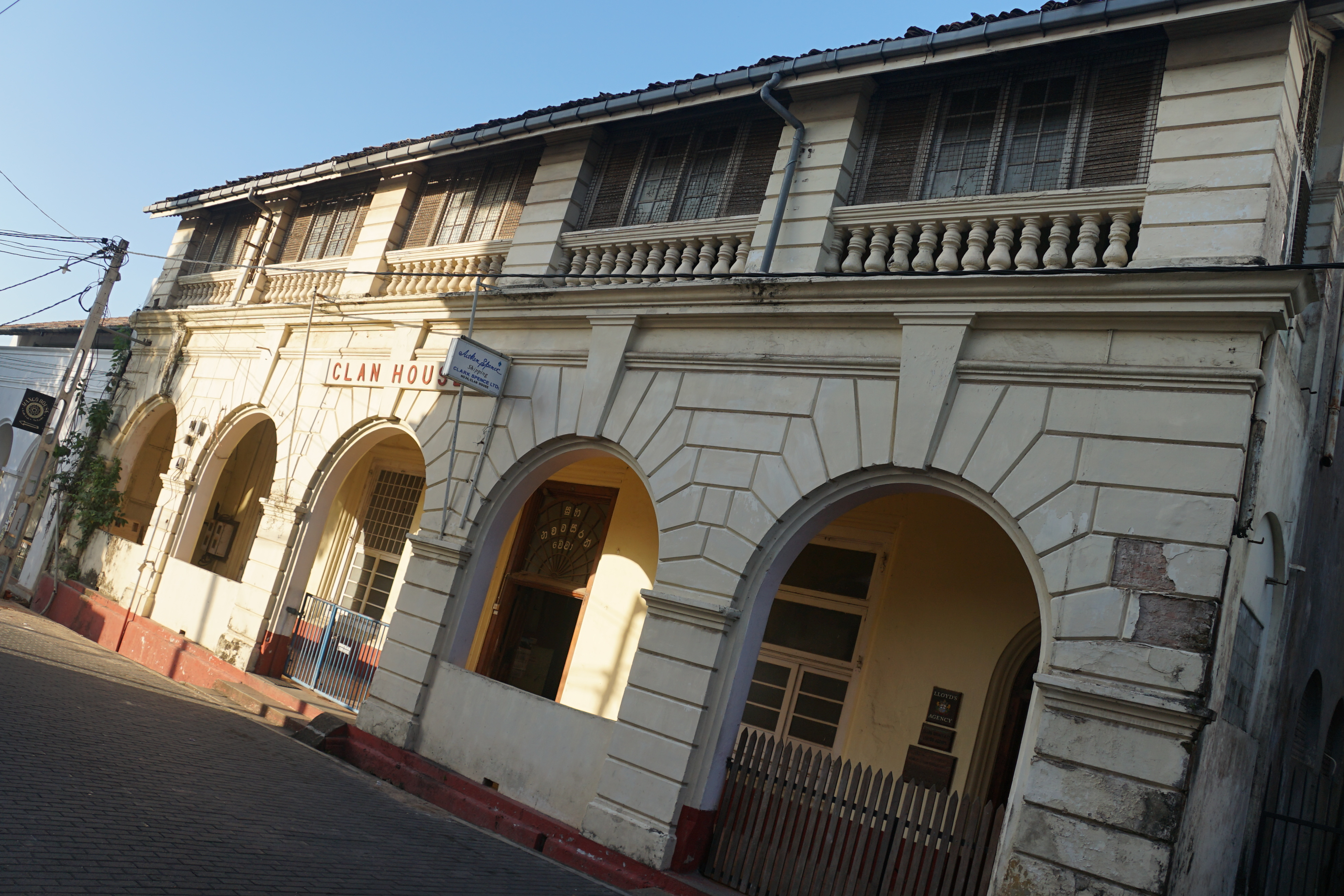
- The front façade of the Clan House Building (2016)
- Interactive map of the Clan House area

General information
- Location: 24 Church Street, Galle, Sri Lanka
- Coordinates: 6.027070°N 80.217640°E
- Owner: Aitken Spence and Co.

Clan House is a two-storey white stone building, located at 24 Church Street, Galle.

Clan House was constructed by John Black and Company, a British mercantile firm, who established themselves in Galle Fort in 1847. The company acted as the coal and shipping agency for the Clan Line shipping company. John Black (1819-1869), a Scotsman, was appointed as the first American Commercial Agent (Consul) in Ceylon in September 1850 and later became a member of the Galle Municipal Council. Following Black's death in February 1869 the company continued to operate under the management of his widow, Isabel, until her death in 1905.

The company of Clark Spence and Company was established on 1 September 1868 after the signing of a formal partnership agreement between Thomas Clark and Patrick Gordon Spence—Scottish merchants and shipping agents in Galle. In 1873 Clark Spence & Co. became the sole agent of Lloyd’s of London in Ceylon and in 1876 the company was renamed Aitken Spence PLC. In 1929 the building was purchased by Clark Spence and Company, with Clan House becoming the Head Shipping Office of Clark Spence and Company.

The building also housed the shipping agencies for the following companies:

- Asiatic Steam Navigation Company Ltd
- East Asiatic Company Ltd (Copenhagen)
- Royal Dutch Mail Lines
- Ellerman and Bucknall Lines Ltd

As well as the offices of the Sri Lanka Insurance Corporation and the Inland Revenue Department.

In 1999 the Galle office of Aitken Spence Shipping was permanently closed and the operations consolidated at the company's Colombo headquarters. The building is currently owned by Clark Spence and Company, a subsidiary of Aitken Spence and Co.

In June 2014, Aitken Spence revealed plans to convert the building and land to a 20-room boutique hotel, at an estimated cost of Rs 600M.

In 2013/14, we made a concerted decision to strive and revive a property that has a lot of meaning not only to the Aitken Spence Hotel Group but also to our holding company Aitken Spence PLC with the planned renovation of the original Shipping Head Office of Clark Spence Company building to a new heritage hotel within the UNESCO World Heritage Site at Galle Fort.

— Rajan Brito - Aitken Spence Hotel Group Managing Director
