= Galle Clock Tower =

Clock tower

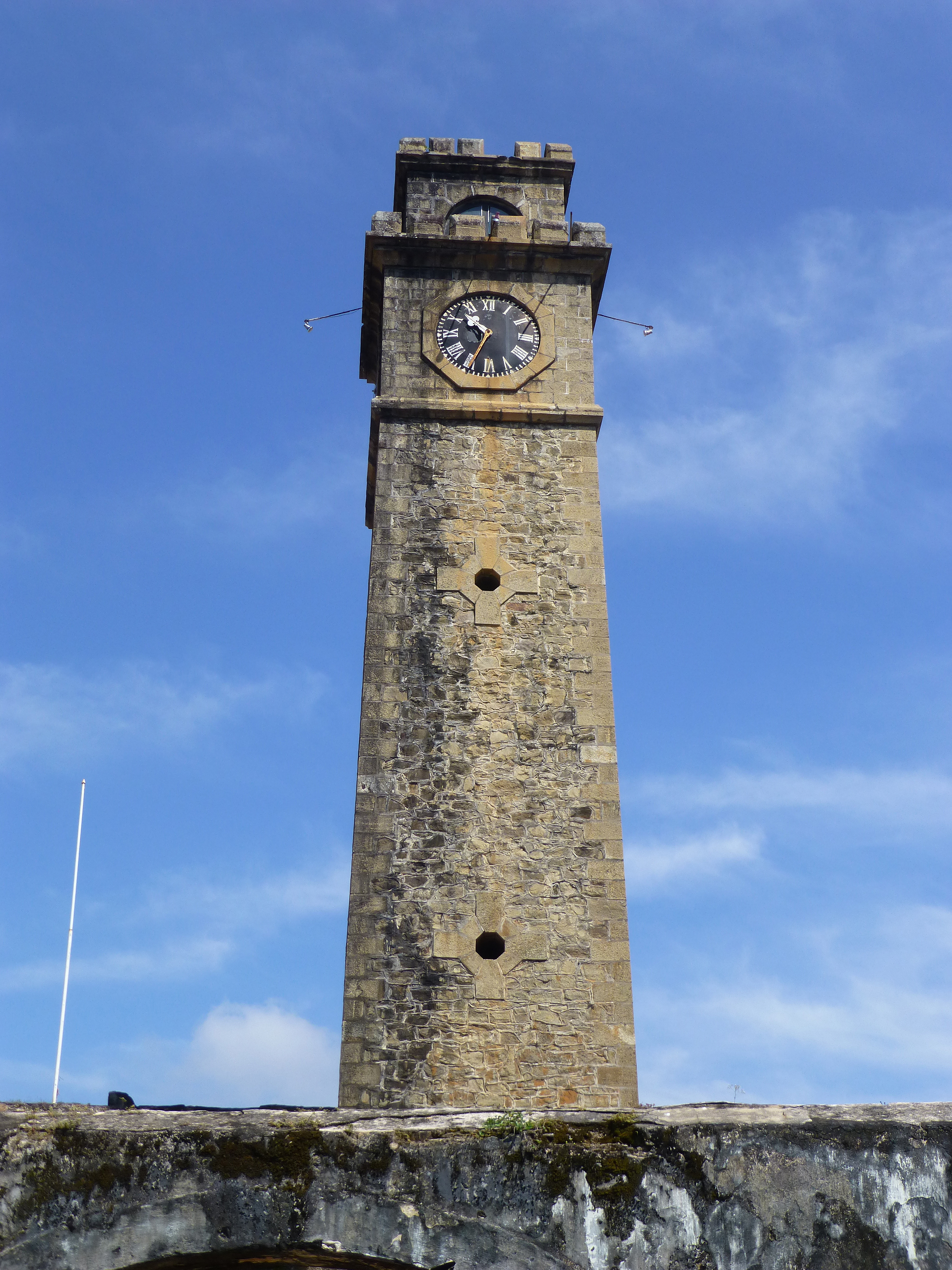
Galle Clock Tower

The Galle Clock Tower (or Anthonisz Memorial Clock Tower) is located within the Galle Fort in Galle, Sri Lanka. The Clock Tower is a popular landmark and overlooks the central Moon Bastion, on the site of the former guard room. The clock tower was constructed in 1883, paid for through public subscriptions by the people of Galle, in recognition of Dr. P. D. Anthonisz. It was based on a design by John Henry Gues Landon. The clock was the sole gift of a grateful patient, Mudaliyar Samson de Abrew Rajapakse.

The plate on the clock tower carries the inscription:

"This tower erected by public subscription to the perpetual memory of Peter Daniel Anthonisz (born in Galle) in testimony of his skill and benevolence in relieving human suffering. MDCCCLXXXIII".

Dr. Anthonisz (1822-1903) was a renowned Burgher doctor, who served as the Colonial Surgeon for the Southern Province and as a representative on the Legislative Council of Ceylon.

The tower is roughly four storeys high (25.3 m (83 ft)) and is situated immediately inside the fort ramparts.

== See also ==
- Galle Fort
- Galle Lighthouse
