= Old Dutch Hospital, Galle =

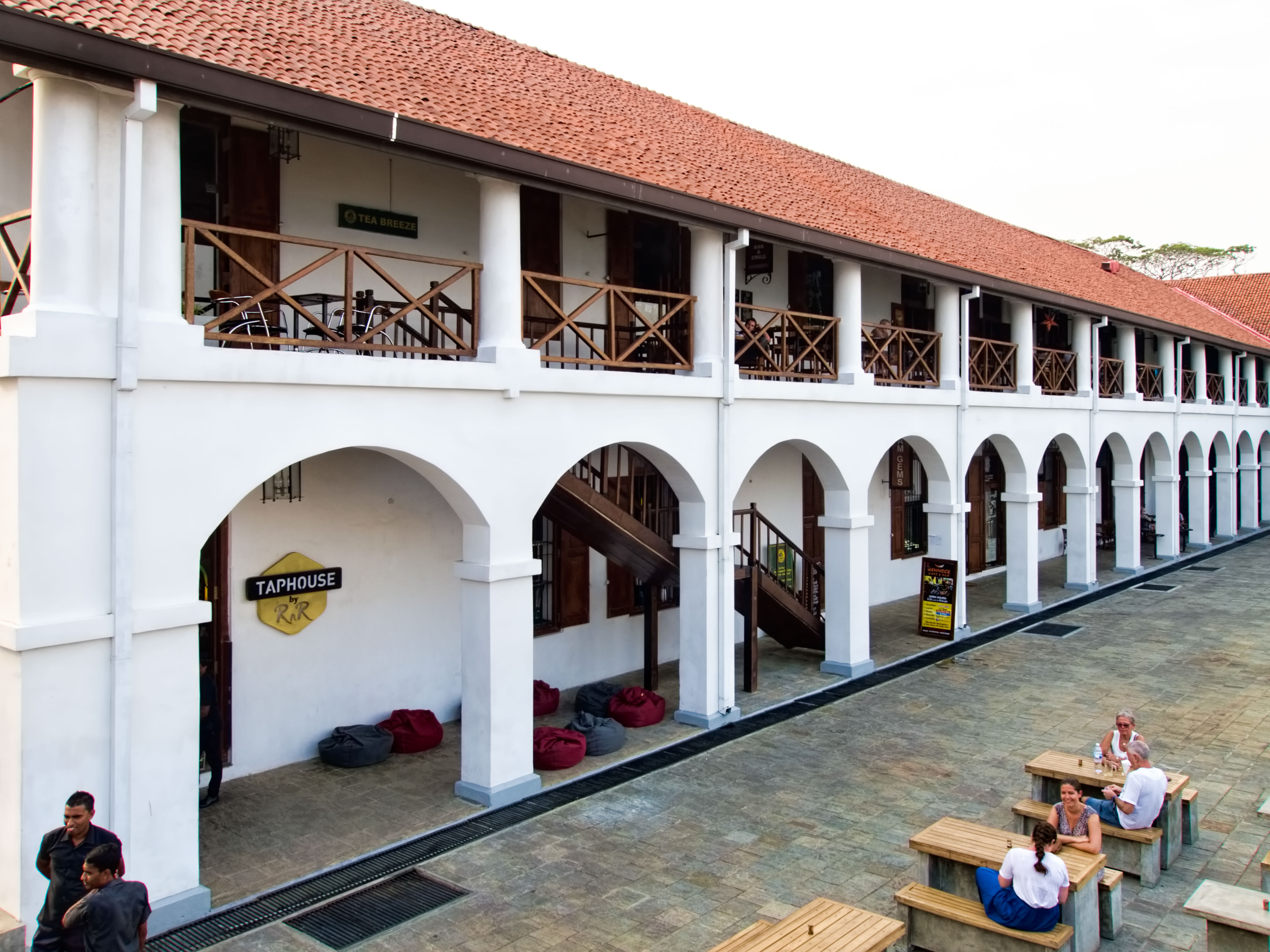
- The courtyard of the Old Dutch Hospital complex
- Location: Galle Fort, Sri Lanka
- Coordinates: 6°1′36″N 80°13′10″E
- Opened: 20 September 2014
- Developer: Urban Development Authority
- Num. of stores: 18
- Floor area: 2,876 sq ft (267.2 m^{2})
- Floors: 2

The Old Dutch Hospital, Galle (also known as The Old Galle Dutch Hospital) is one of the oldest buildings in the Galle Fort area dating back to the Dutch colonial era in Sri Lanka. The heritage building has now been developed into a shopping and dining precinct.

== History ==
Built as a hospital by the Dutch, it has been used for several different purposes, over the years. The Dutch established the Galle hospital to look after the health of the officers and other staff serving under the Dutch East India Company. The hospital's close proximity to the harbour allowed it to serve Dutch seafarers. The hospital was constructed on the site of the Portuguese mint between the Black Fort and Aurora bastion.

During the 17th Century, the Dutch constructed a two-storey hospital on the eastern side of Galle fort. It was designed with long colonnaded verandas on both sides and floors of the building. The Dutch used cabook (coral stone) for the masonry work, with granite paved floors and thick plinth walls. Later, the masonry work was plastered over and white washed. After the British captured the fort in February 1796 they extended the building towards the north along the same ground plan. They used bricks as building materials and introduced glazed windows and glazed fanlights to this section. They also built a subsequent extension towards the sea starting from the middle of the existing building. Whilst built at different times the construction and design make the building appear as a single entity.

In 1850 the British converted the hospital into a barracks. They then used the building for the office of the Government Agent, who was the chief administrator of the district, until the country's independence in 1948.

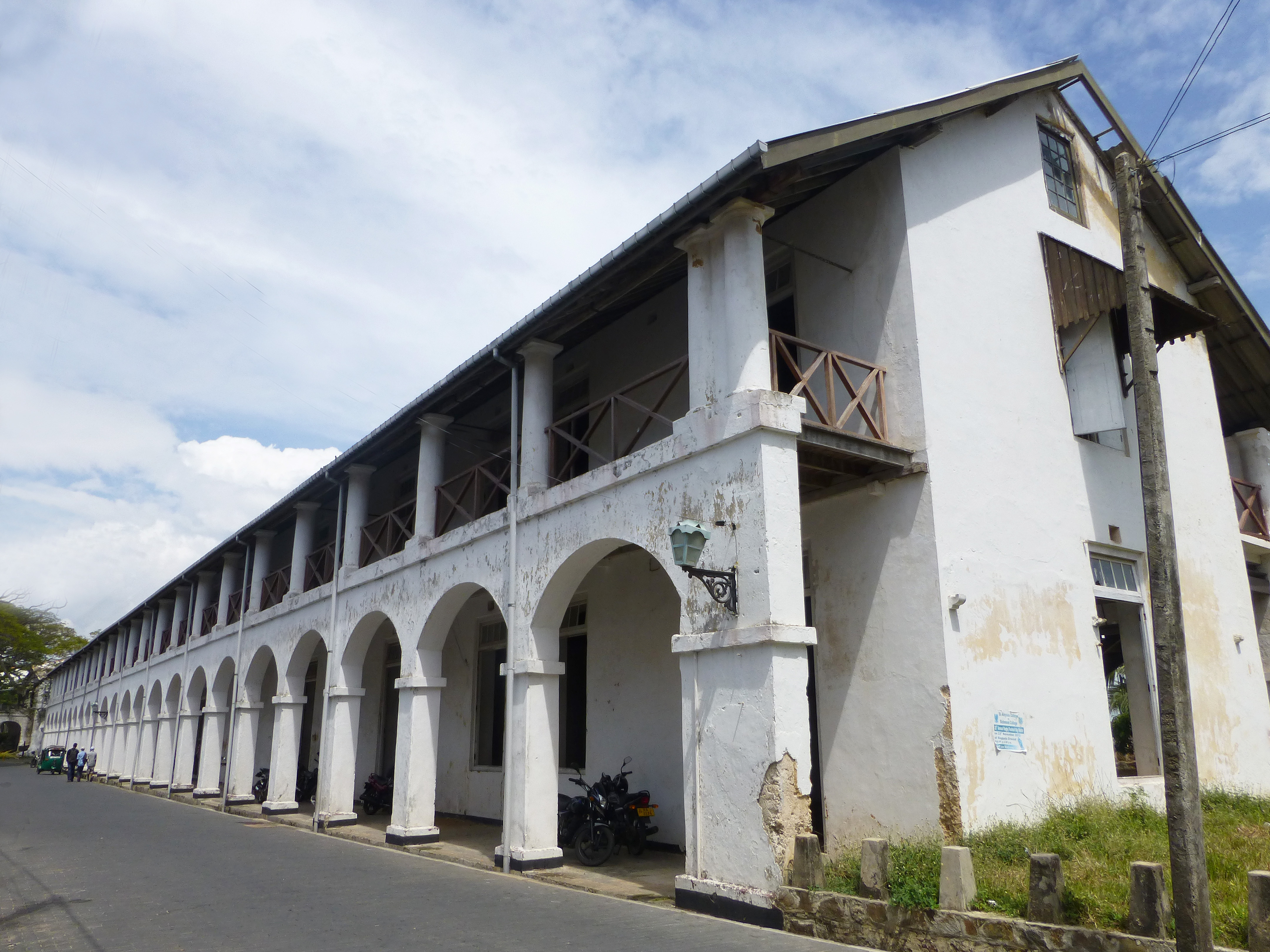
Old Dutch Hospital (2013) prior to its conversion

Following Sri Lanka's independence the building was used as the Galle Town Hall. The first meeting of the Galle Municipal Council was held on 26 April 1967 at the Galle Kachcheri building. Over the years, the space inside the original building became too small for its new function. The verandahs, as well as parts of the colonnades, were filled with offices. In 2003 the offices were relocated to sites outside Galle fort.

In 2006 the International Council on Monuments and Sites (ICOMOS), with funding from American Express and the World Monuments Fund (WMF) commenced conservation and restoration works to the roof, walls, windows and other architectural details, as well as updating the building's sewage system. These works continued until December 2009 when water seepage caused a portion of the two-story building and colonnade to collapse. The restoration works were subsequently completed in March 2011.

In 2014, the building was converted into a shopping and dining precinct, with the historic architecture having been preserved. The renovation and conversion works was carried out by the Urban Development Authority with the assistance of the 10th Engineering Regiment of the Sri Lankan Army. The complex was formally opened by President of Sri Lanka, Mahinda Rajapaksa on 20 September 2014.

== Architecture ==
The building reflects seventeenth-century Dutch colonial architecture.

The building is designed to keep out the heat and humidity and provide a comfortable environment within. Like many Dutch buildings of the era, the walls are 50 cm (20 in) thick. The structure features massive teak beams. The upper floor can be reached with a wooden staircase. The upper storey has a wooden floor. Long open verandahs run along the length of each wing of the building.
