= Amangalla =

Hotel in Galle, Sri Lanka

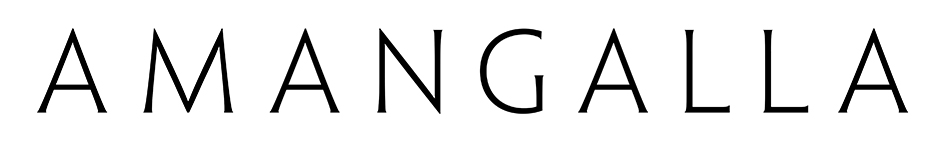

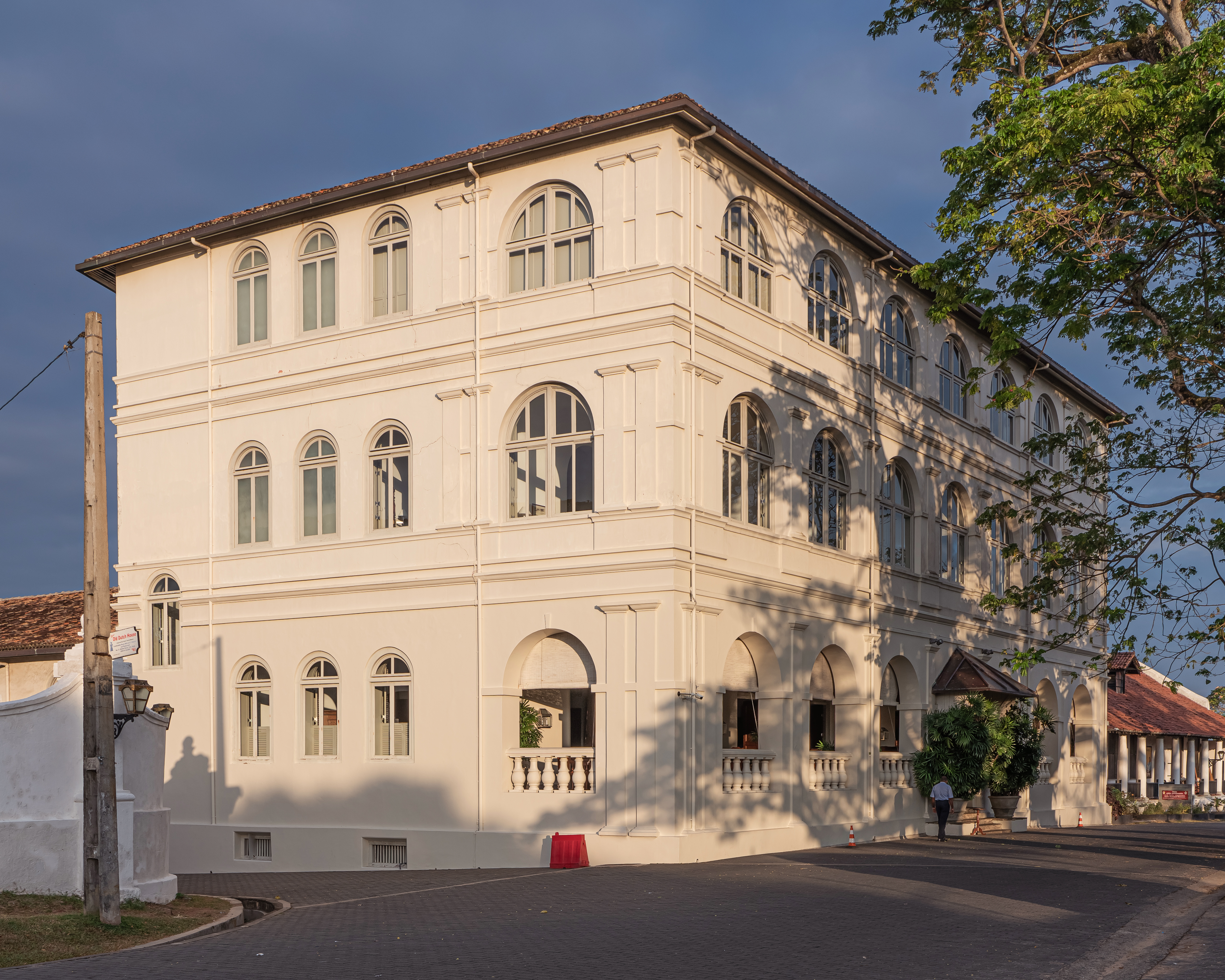
- Amangalla Hotel

- Location within Sri Lanka

General information
- Location: 10 Church Street, Galle, Sri Lanka
- Coordinates: 6°1′59″N 80°13′0″E
- Opening: 1865; 2005
- Owner: Aman Resorts

Website
- Amangalla

Amangalla is a 5-star franchise hotel belonging to the international group of Aman Resorts, located in Galle, Sri Lanka built within Galle Fort, the 17th-century Dutch fort, inscribed as a UNESCO World Heritage Site. Just to its north is the Galle International Stadium and roundabout. The oldest part of the hotel dates to 1684, and the complex was completed in 1715. It was known as the New Oriental Hotel for 140 years from 1865. In 2005 it became Amangalla resort complex. Aman means "peace" and galla is the Sinhalese name for Galle.

== Geography ==
The hotel is situated in Galle, the capital of the Southern Province of Sri Lanka and is located inside the historic Galle Fort, a hexagonal stone fort built over an area of 36 hectares (89 acres). The fort, fully inhabited, has many period buildings of the colonial era within a network of narrow roads.

== History ==
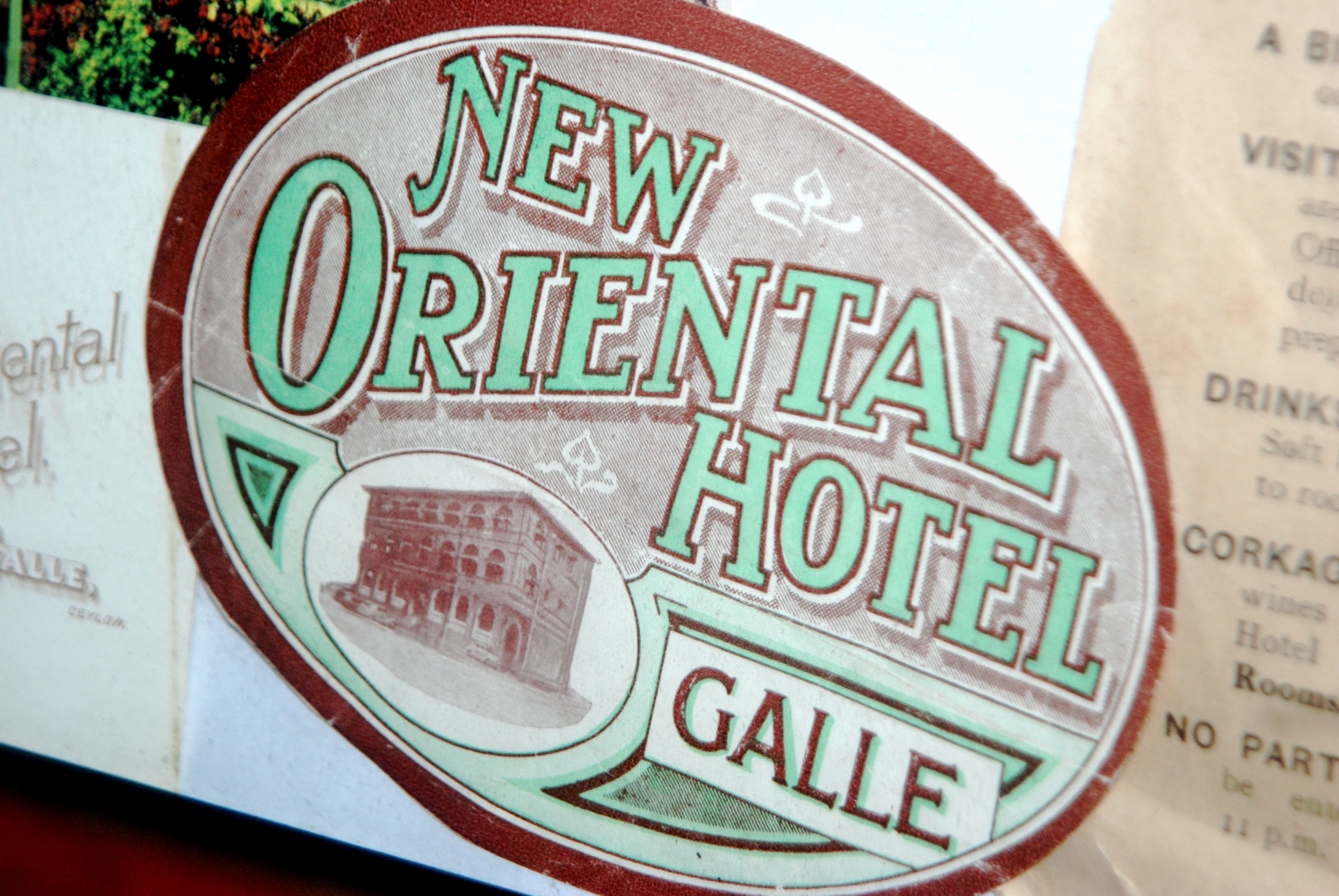
Amangalla, Fort Galle, formerly the New Oriental Hotel

The complex of buildings was originally built in 1684 as the headquarters of the Dutch commanders and their staff. During the British rule, the complex was used as the quarters for their soldiers. In 1865 it was converted into the New Orient Hotel, catering to the European passengers travelling between Europe and Galle port in the 19th century. It subsequently became a heritage hotel under the Aman Resorts group of international hotels in 2005 and was renamed Amangalla. The Lonely Planet describes the Amangalla as an "ultra posh hotel" catering to the first class airline passengers.

== Architecture and facilities ==
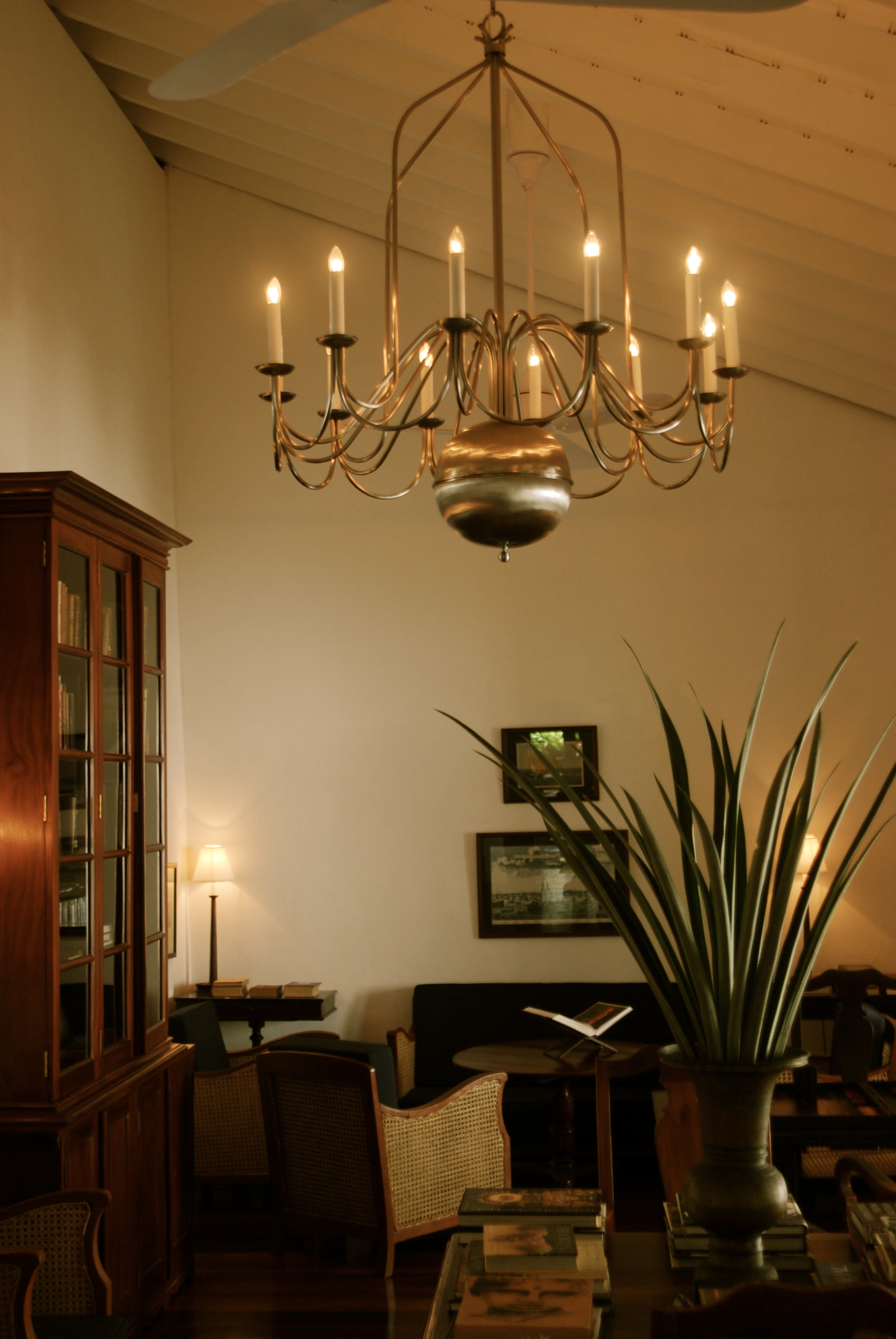
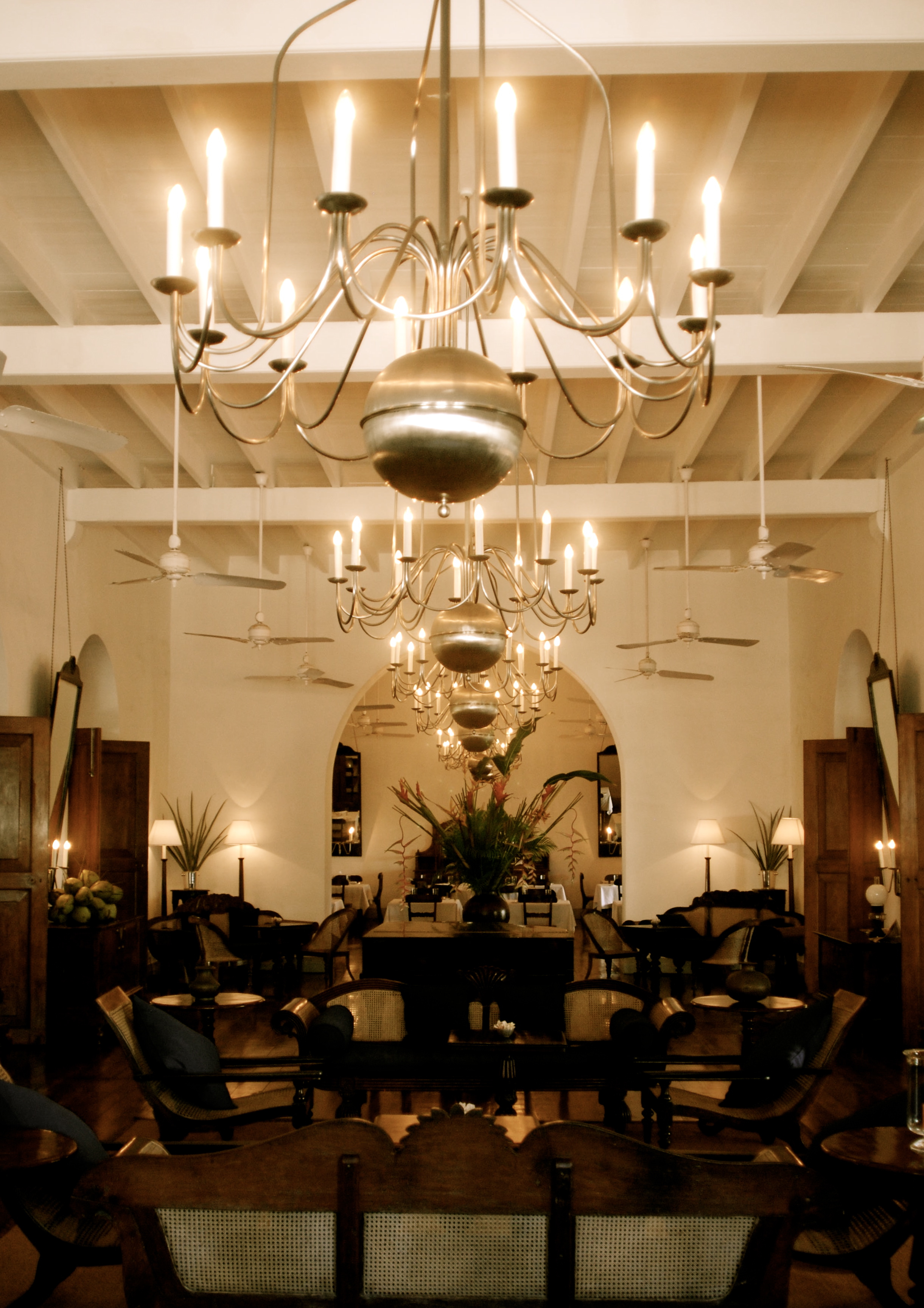
Left: Interior view in Amangalla. Right: Interior views of Amangalla.

Some of the walls are said to be made of sandstone and 1 metre (3 ft 3 in) thick and the ceiling to many of the rooms are about 6 metres (20 ft) in height. There are a total of 33 rooms and suites, as of 2009, some of the suites have been designed by combining several old rooms. The entry to the hotel is through the Great Hall, called "Zaal" by the Dutch, which is a Dutch colonial legacy. The hall has a high ceiling which is fronted by a shuttered verandah that faces a street with an avenue of trees. The dining hall, furnished with period furniture, provides all meals including Sri Lankan dishes, all served in traditional antique silverware.

The 19th-century vintage New Oriental Hotel was modernised by Aman Resorts Group. They retained the traditional decor and installed modern period fittings. The Aman Group also made new additions, including a spa and a large swimming pool.
