= Galle Fort =

Historic military fortress in Sri Lanka

Galle Fort Dutch Fort
- Part of Galle
- Galle, Sri Lanka
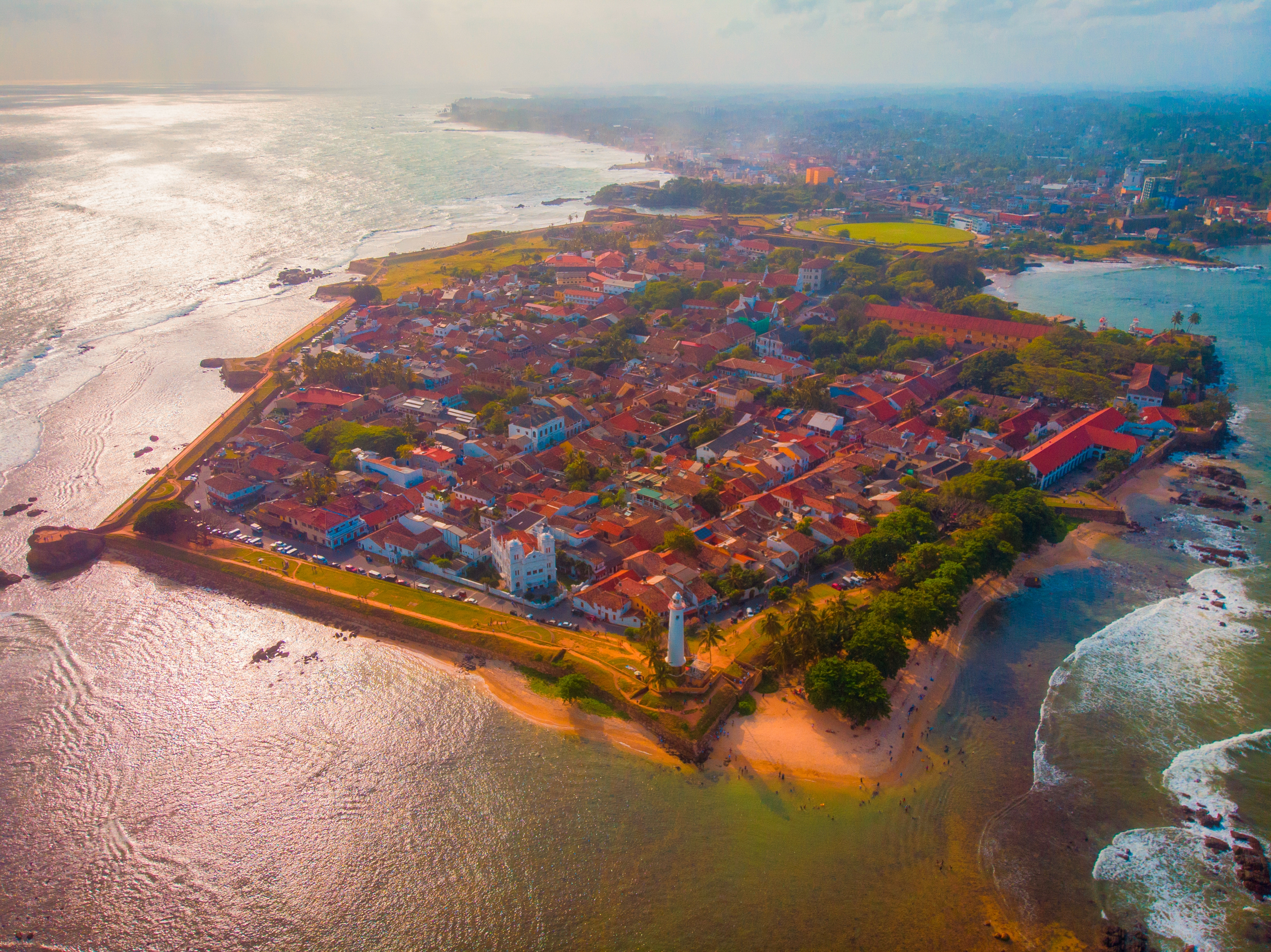
- Aerial view of Galle Fort

Site information
- Type: Defence fort
- Controlled by: Government of Sri Lanka
- Open to the public: Yes
- Condition: Good

Location
- Sri Lanka
- Location within Sri Lanka
- Coordinates: 6.025833°N 80.2175°E

Site history
- Built: 1584; 442 years ago and 1684; 342 years ago
- Built by: Portuguese and Dutch
- Materials: Granite Stones and coral
- Battles/wars: Siege of Galle (1640); Several other battles

UNESCO World Heritage Site
- Official name: Old Town of Galle and its Fortifications
- Type: Cultural
- Criteria: iv
- Designated: 1988 (10th session)
- Reference no.: 451
- Region: Asia-Pacific

Archaeological Protected Monument of Sri Lanka

Galle Fort (Sinhala: ගාලු කොටුව Galu Kotuwa; Tamil: காலிக் கோட்டை, romanized: Kālik Kōṭṭai), in the Bay of Galle on the southwest coast of Sri Lanka, was built first in 1588 by the Portuguese, then extensively fortified by the Dutch during the 17th century from 1649 onwards. It is a historical, archaeological and architectural heritage monument, which even after more than 437 years maintains a polished appearance, due to extensive reconstruction work done by the Archaeological Department of Sri Lanka.

The fort has a colourful history, and today has a multi-ethnic and multi-religious population. The heritage value of the fort has been recognized by UNESCO and the site has been inscribed as a cultural heritage UNESCO World Heritage Site under criteria iv, for its unique exposition of "an urban ensemble which illustrates the interaction of European architecture and South Asian traditions from the 16th to the 19th centuries."

The Galle Fort, also known as the Dutch Fort or the "Ramparts of Galle", withstood the Boxing Day tsunami of 2004 which damaged part of the coastal Galle town. It has since been restored.

== Etymology ==
There are many versions of the word 'Galle' that is suffixed to the fort. One version is that it is a derivative of 'Gallo' from Portuguese, meaning "rooster". The other version is that it was a "gaala", in Sinhala meaning a "cattle herd" or place where cattle was herded.

== History ==
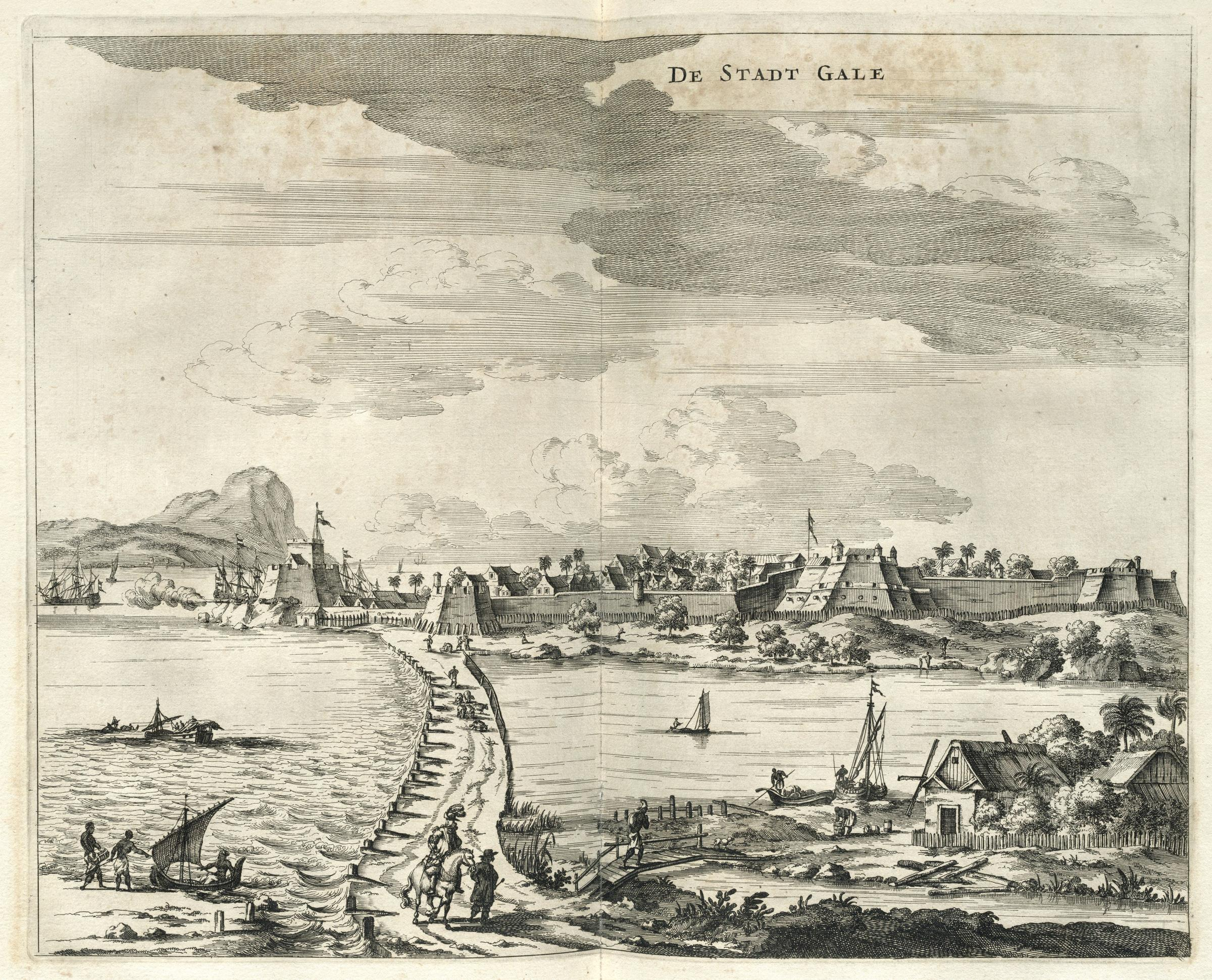
Galle Fort ±1672

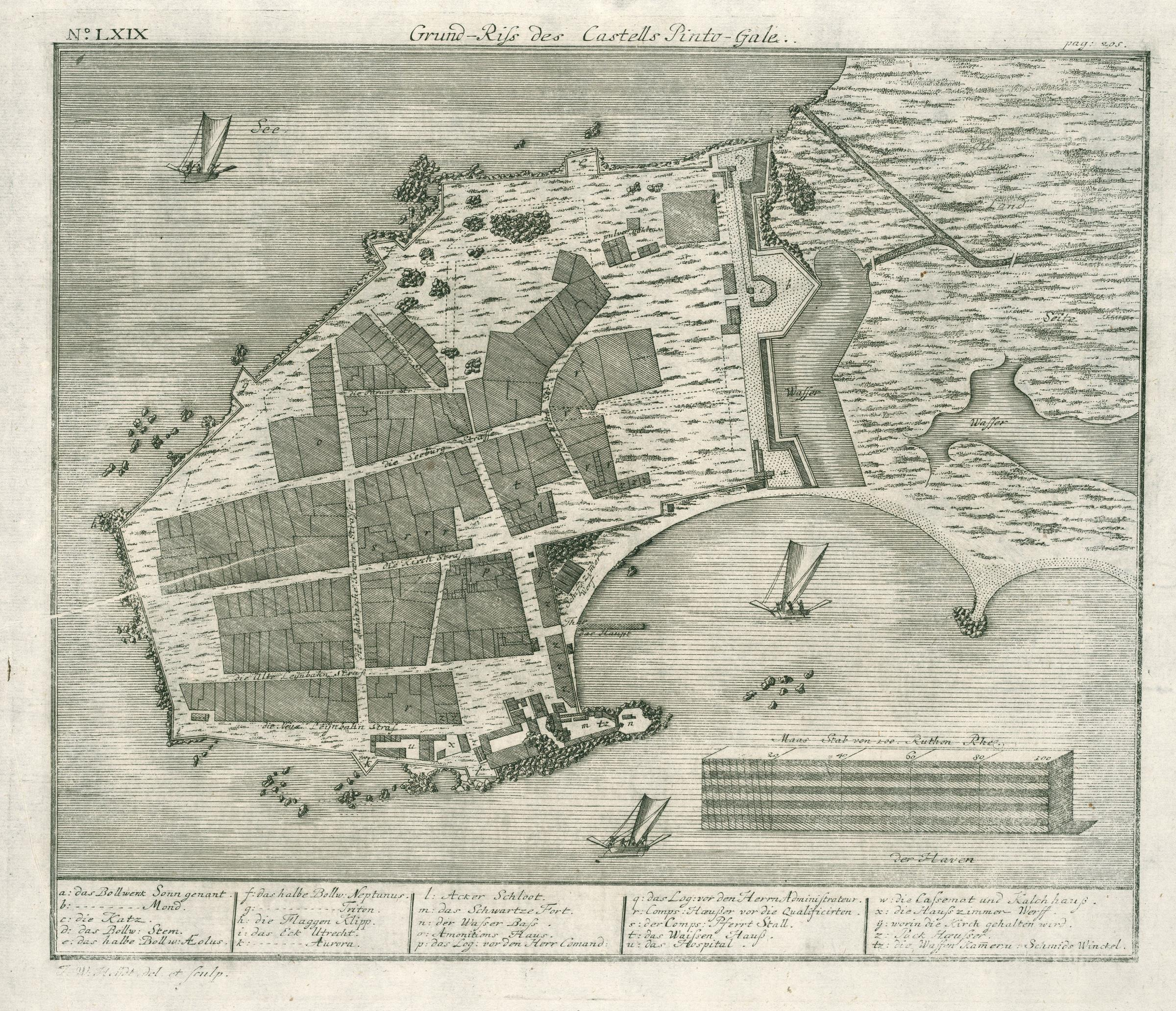
Map of Galle Fort ±1740

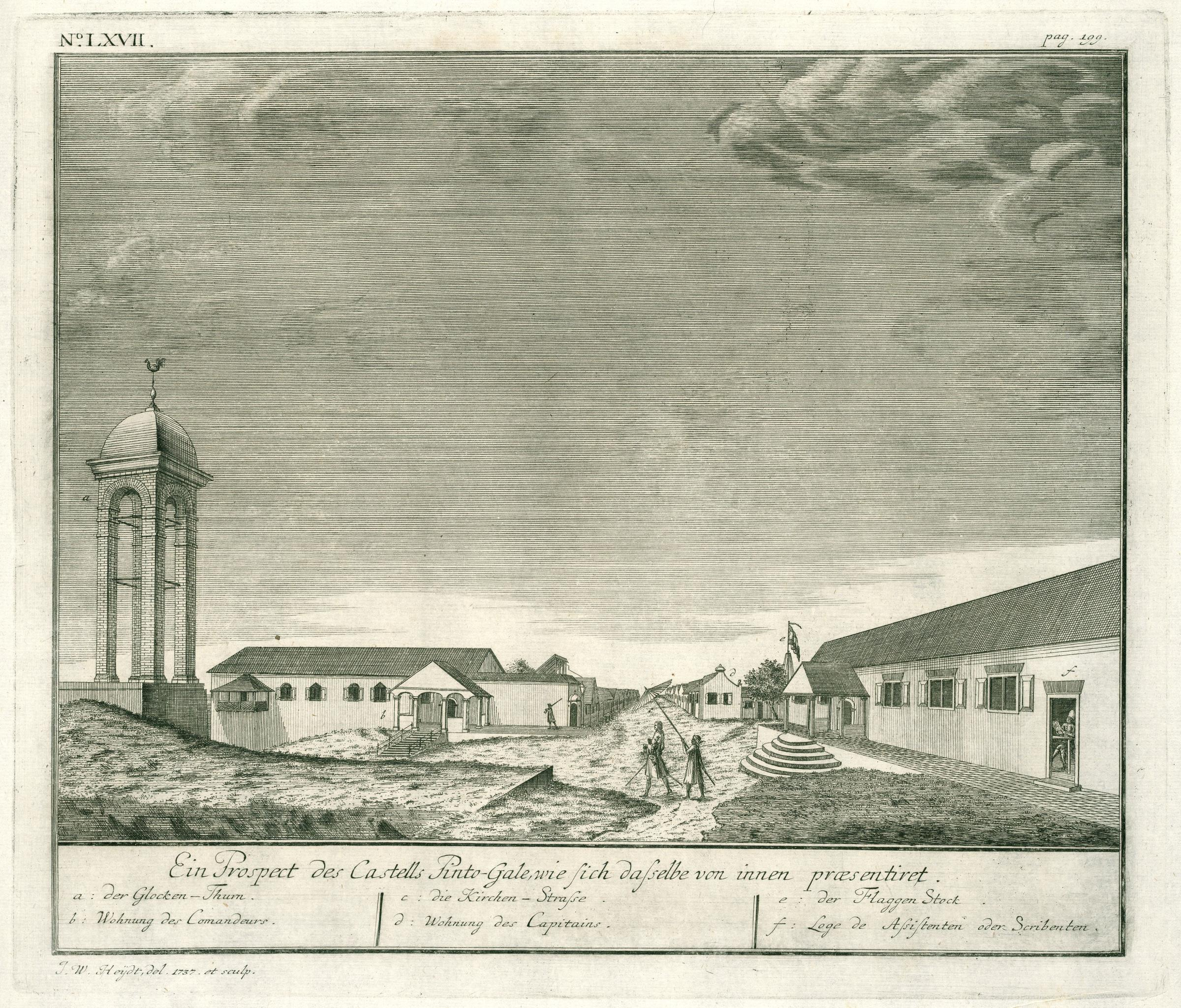
View down Church Street, 1737

Galle's earliest historical existence is traced to Ptolemy's world map of 125–150 CE when it was a busy port, trading with Greece, Arab countries, China and others. Its mention as a "port of call of the Levant" is made in the cosmography of Cosmas Indicopleustes. This is the harbour where the Portuguese, under the leadership of Lourenço de Almeida, made their first landing in 1505 on the island and caused a notable change in developments on the island with their close friendship with Dharmaparakrama Bahu (1484–1514), the then king of the country. Before the Portuguese arrived here, Ibn Batuta had touched base at this port. This was the beginning of the fort's history, which was built by the Portuguese, along with a Franciscan chapel, now mostly in ruins, inside the fort in 1541. The fort in later years served as a prison camp to incarcerate Sinhalese natives who opposed the Portuguese. The Portuguese had moved to Colombo from Galle as they preferred the former. In 1588, however, they were attacked by the Sinhalese King Raja Singha I (1581–93) of Sitawaka, which forced the Portuguese to return to Galle. At Galle, they initially built a small fort out of palm trees and mud. They called it the Santa Cruz and later extended it with a watch tower and three bastions and a "fortalice" to guard the harbour.

In 1640 the Dutch entered the fray and joined with King Rajasinhe II to capture the Galle Fort. The Dutch, with a force of some 2,500 men under Koster, captured the fort from the Portuguese that year. Although not an ideal situation for the Sinhalese, they were instrumental in building the fort as seen in its present form in the Dutch architectural style. Fortifications were added up to the early 18th century. The establishment consisted of public administration buildings, warehouses, and business houses, and residential quarters. A Protestant church (planned by Abraham Anthonisz) was also built in baroque style in 1775 to cater to the colonists and the local people who were converted to Christianity. The most prominent buildings in the fort complex were the Commandant's residence, the arsenal and the gun house. Other buildings erected in the fort catered to trade and defense requirements such as workshops for carpentry, smithy, rope making, and so forth. They also built an elaborate system of sewers that were flooded at high tide, taking the sewage away to sea.

The British took over the fort on 23 February 1796, one week after Colombo was captured. Sri Lanka remained a British colony formally from 1815 until it became an independent island nation in 1948. The importance of Galle also declined after the British developed Colombo as their capital and main port in the mid nineteenth century.

After the fort came under the control of the British in 1796, it remained their southern headquarters. They made many modifications to the fort, such as closing the moat, building houses, a lighthouse on the Utrecht Bastion, a gate between the Moon Bastion and the Sun Bastion. A tower was erected in 1883 to commemorate the jubilee of Queen Victoria. The Second World War saw many more fortifications built to defend the fort. In spite of all the changes made over the years since it was first built between the 16th and the 19th century, the Galle Fort still remains a unique monument complex said to be "the best example of a fortified city with a fusion of European architecture and South Asian traditions built by Europeans in South and Southeast Asia".

== Geography ==
Galle Fort is in Galle, on the coast at the extreme southwest corner of Sri Lanka, where the shoreline turns east towards Matara and Tangalle. The fort, like most of the forts in Sri Lanka, is built on a small rocky peninsula, belonging to the sea as much as to the land. As it exists today, it covers an area of 52 hectares (130 acres).

Highway A2 provides road links to Galle from Colombo (a distance of 113 kilometres (70 mi)) and the rest of the country along the west coast or from the east along the south coast. Since 2012 an expressway has linked Galle to Colombo. Rail links are also available to Colombo and Matara. Sea route is through the Galle Port at the Galle Harbour.

== Demographics ==
The Galle city (population 112,000, over an area of 16.5 square kilometres (6.4 sq mi)) has developed around the fort area. The story of the fort is well illustrated by many signs and plaques which provide information about each monument. More than half of the inhabitants inside the fort are Moors, with Sinhalese, Dutch, English, Portuguese and German settlers. Details of the history of the fort are available at the visitor center and at the Dutch-period museum inside the Fort.

The fort area is occupied by mostly artists, writers, photographers, designers and poets of foreign origin, and has boutiques, hotels and restaurants.

== Fortifications ==
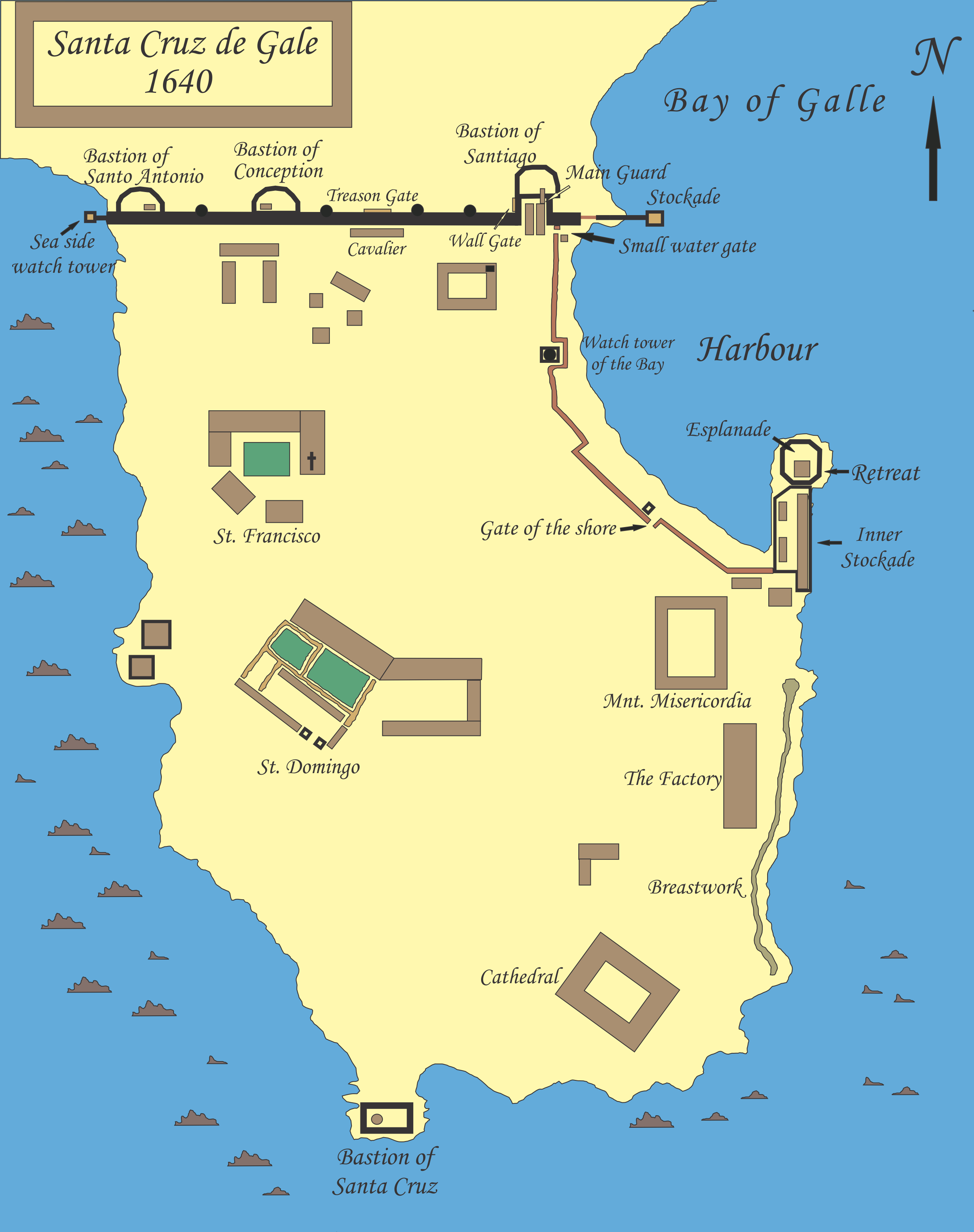
Map of Santa Cruz de Gale in 1640

The fort, originally built by the Portuguese in the 16th century to defend Galle, was an earthen structure with palisades covering the northern inland side with a rampart and three bastions. They believed that the seaward side was impregnable and hence did not construct any fortifications on the sea side, except for the Zwart Bastion.

When the fort came under the control of the Dutch, they considered the old fortifications built by the Portuguese unsafe as they were made of earth and palisades. The Dutch decided to fully encircle the entire peninsula by building impregnable fortifications as defense against other colonial agencies in the region. They built 13 more bastions with coral and granite stones over an area of 52 hectares (130 acres). Many of the fortification walls were built in 1663. The sea wall was completed in 1729.

=== Gates ===
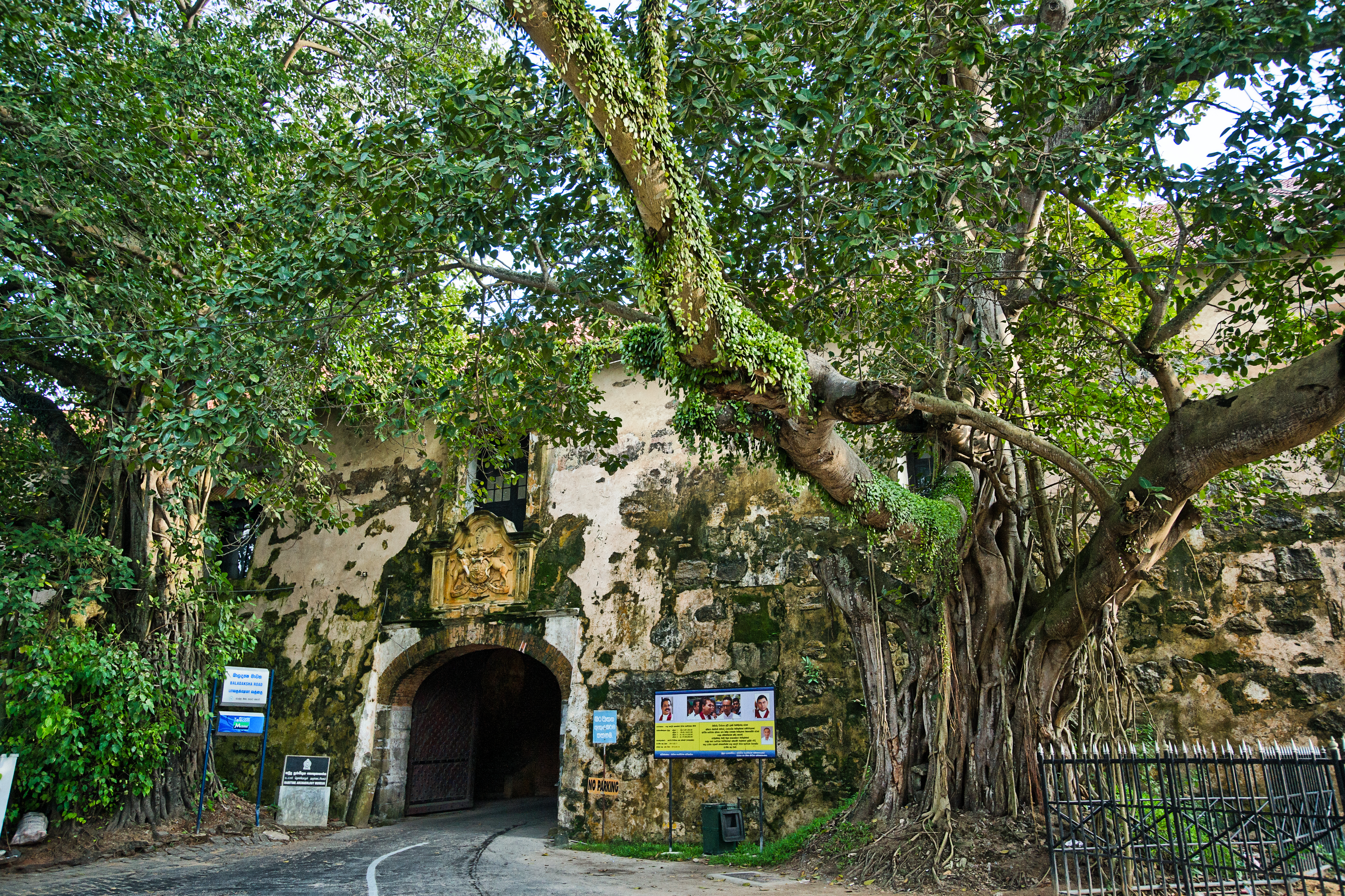
The Old Gate to the Galle Fort

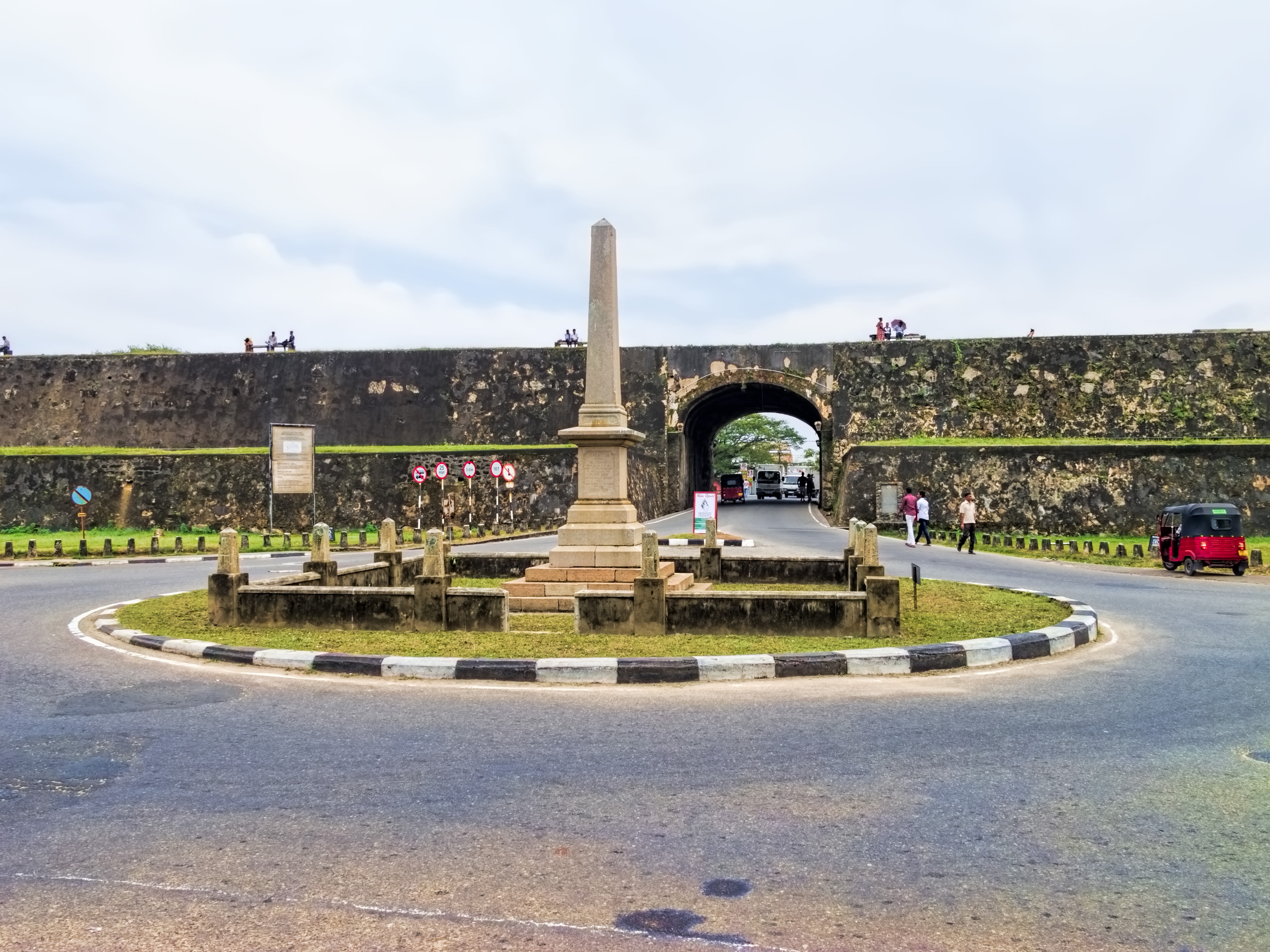
The Main Gate to the Galle Fort

Galle Fort has two, formerly portcullis, gates. The oldest of the two was completed by the Dutch in 1669. At the time it was protected by a drawbridge and a ditch. It is on the southern end of the Baladaksha Mawatha (street). Above the entrance there was an emblem of the Vereenigde Oostindische Compagnie (VOC, the Dutch East India Company): A relief with a rooster on a rock above a shield with the letters 'VOC', flanked by two lions. On the bottom an inscription reads 'ANNO MDCLXIX' (The Year 1669). When the British took over in 1796, they moved the VOC emblem to the inside of the gate and replaced it with a coat of arms of King George III, leaving a stone dated 1668 and a small VOC emblem in place.

This British royal coat of arms shows the English lion and the Scottish unicorn holding a round shield with four symbols of the different parts of the United Kingdom. The edge of the shield is adorned with a garter bearing the motto 'Honi soit qui mal y pense' (Shame to him who evil thinks). Above the shield stands the royal crown. Below it is a ribbon with the motto of the British sovereign: 'Dieu et mon droit' (God and my right). The arms of the House of Hanover are in the centre of the round shield.

The new, Main Gate in the northern stretch of the fortifications, between the Moon Bastion and the Sun Bastion, was opened in 1873. This gate had become necessary after Galle became the administrative centre of the south of Ceylon.

=== Bastions ===
Further along the eastern fort wall is the Portuguese-built oldest bastion, known as Zwart Bastion, meaning Black Bastion. The eastern section of the fort terminates in the Point Utrecht Bastion; the powder house is also here. The 18 metres (59 ft) high Galle Lighthouse was erected here in 1938. The next stretch of the fort wall is the location of Flag Rock Bastion, which was used as a signalling station to warn ships entering the port of the hazardous rocky stretches of the bay. Ships were warned by firing musket shots from Pigeon Island near the flag rock. Further along the fort walls is the Triton Bastion where a windmill drew water from the sea to sprinkle the dusty roads of the town; it is also a viewpoint from which to watch sunsets.

More bastions are seen along the fortifications from the Triton Bastion up to the Main Gate. In total there are 14 bastions: Sun Bastion, Moon Bastion, Star Bastion, Zwart Bastion, Akersloot Bastion, Aurora Bastion, Point Utrecht Bastion, Triton Bastion, Neptune Bastion, Clippenburg Bastion, Flagrock Bastion, Aeolus Bastion, Fishmark Bastion and Commandment Bastion.

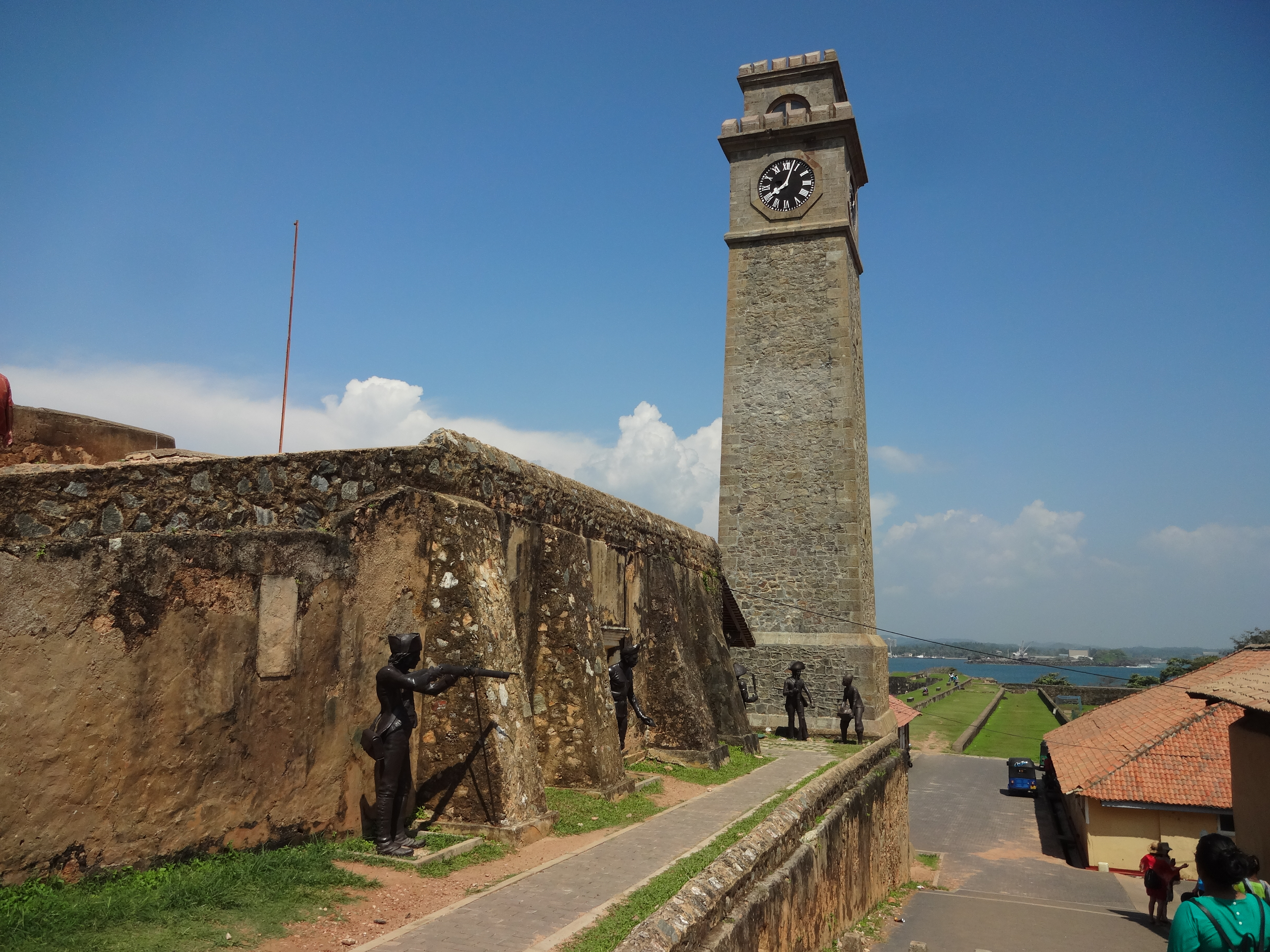
Moon Bastion with clocktower

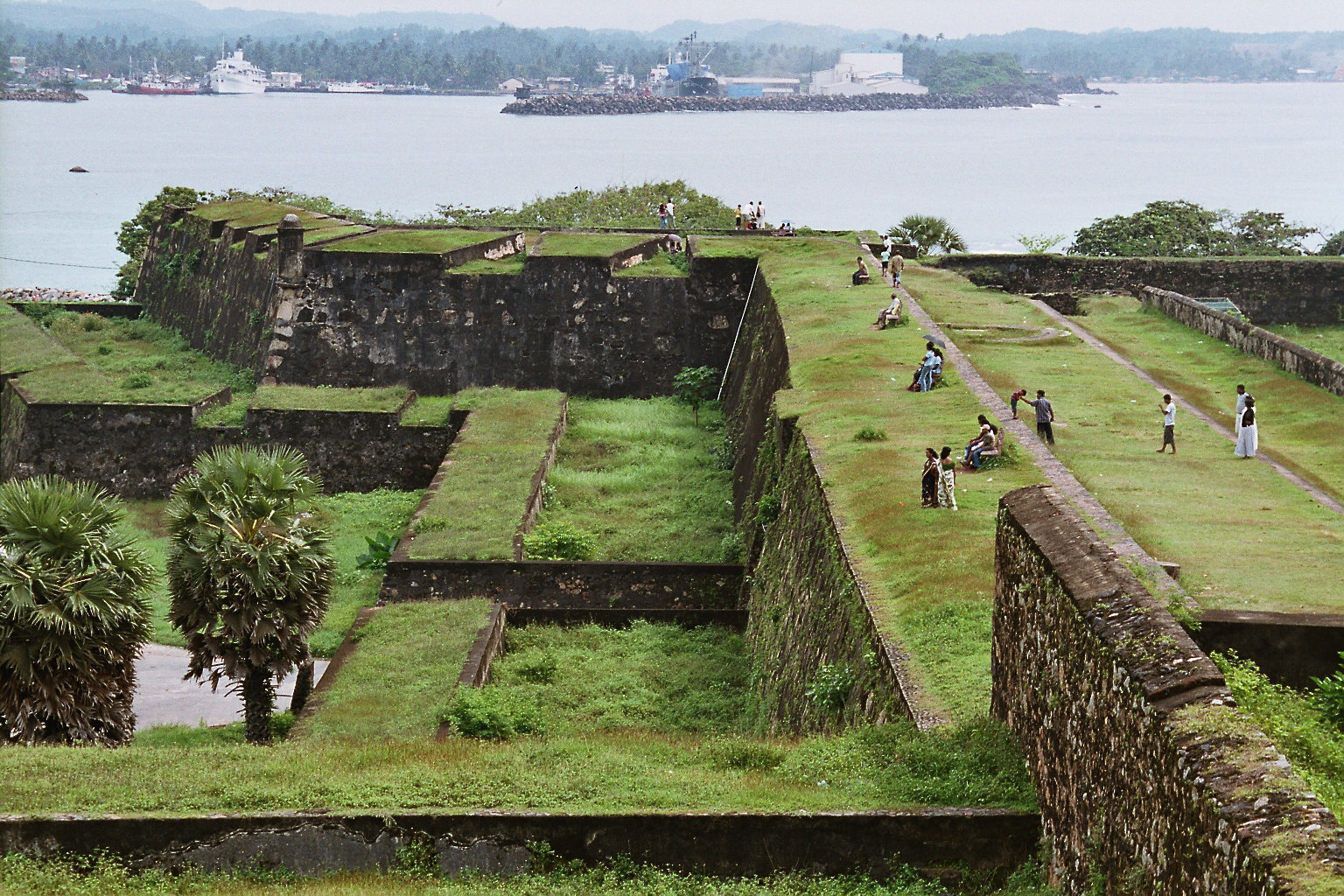
Sun bastion from the west

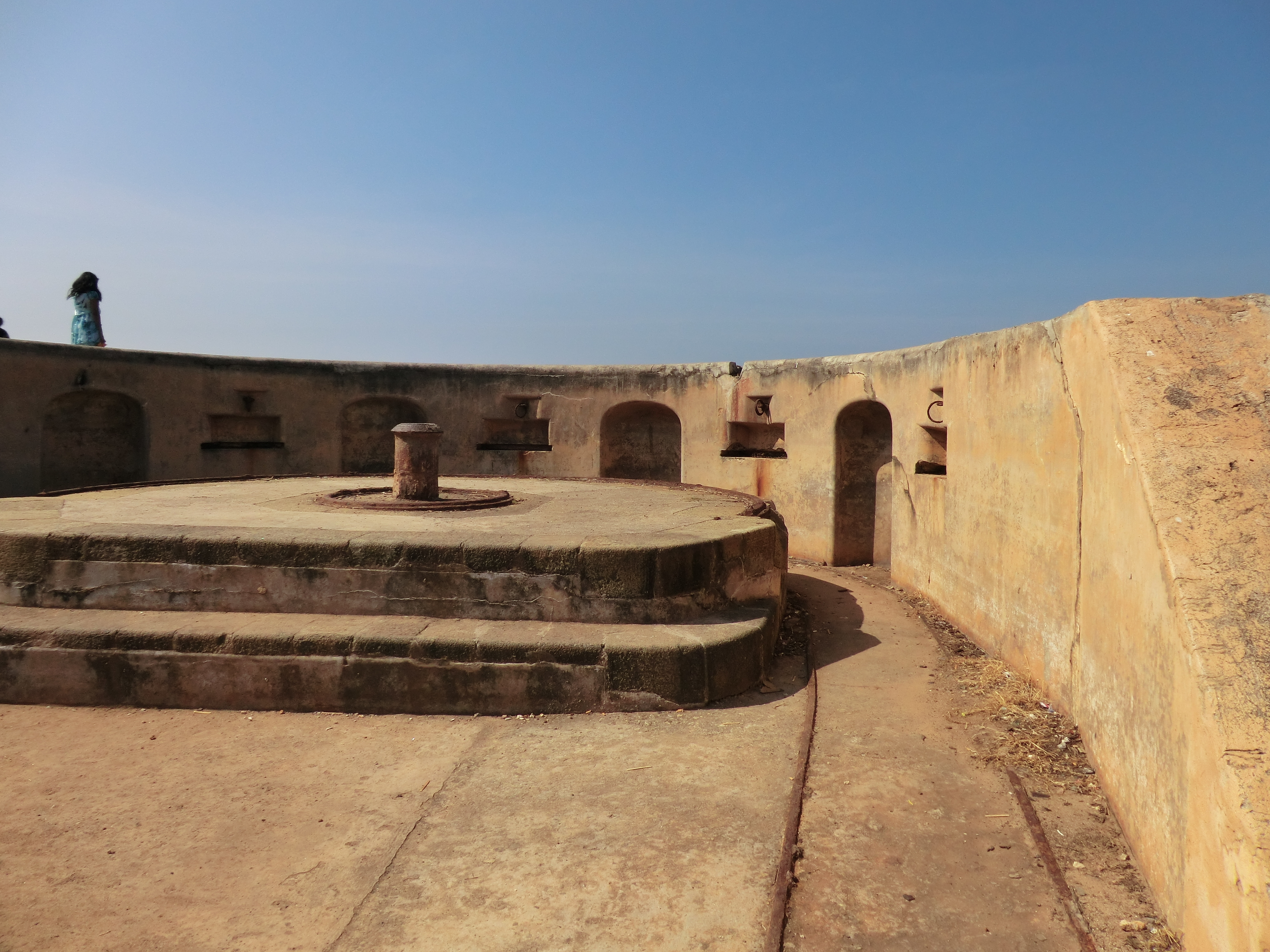
Triton Bastion

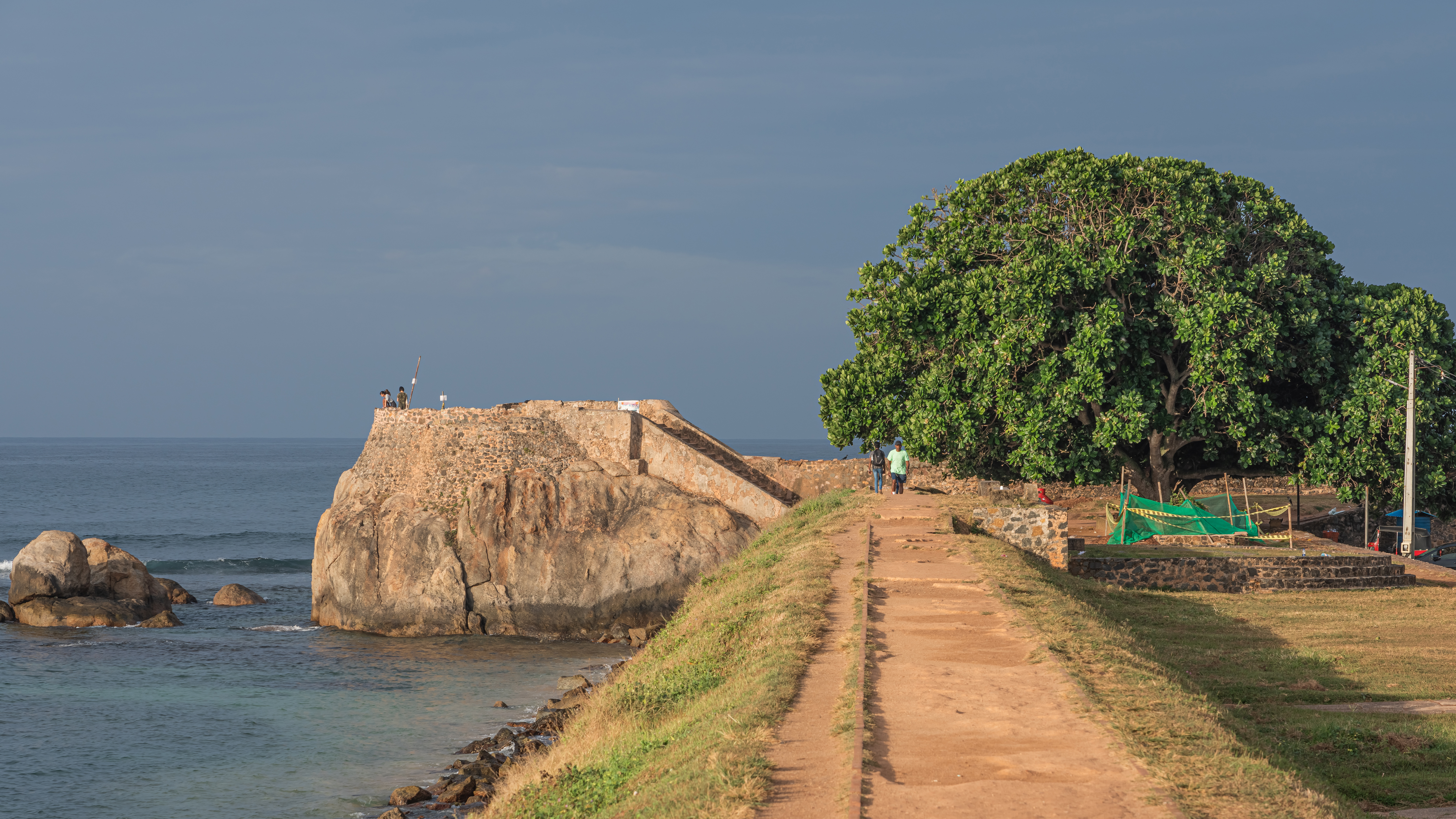
Sea side wall with Flagrock Bastion

== Layout ==
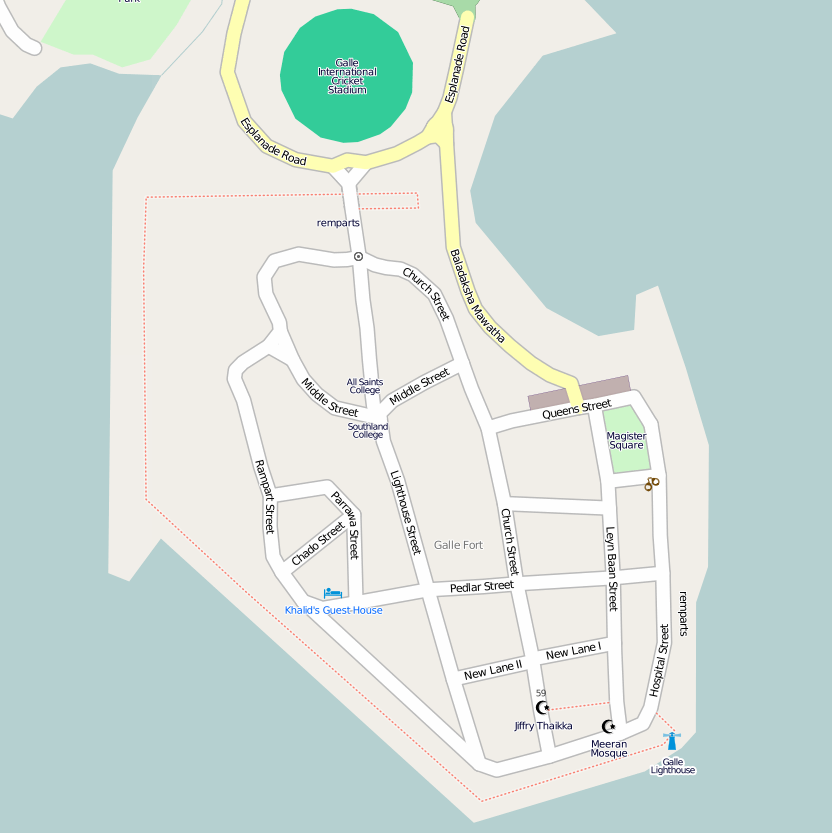
Street map

The urban area within the fort has a rectangular grid pattern of streets full of low houses with gables and verandahs in the Dutch colonial style. It has a well-laid-out road network with the peripheral roads aligned parallel to the fort's ramparts. The fort area also has a number of historic churches, mosques, commercial and government buildings. Some local people stroll along the walls of the fort in the evenings.

Many buildings are of Dutch vintage with street names also in Dutch. The sewerage system built in the fort area ensured that the city sewerage was flushed into the sea during the tidal cycle. The Dutch exploited the muskrats in the sewers by exporting them to extract musk oil.

=== Street names ===
Most of the street names are a legacy from the colonial period, including Pedlar Street or 'Moorse Kramerstraat', the Moorish pedlar street, named after the Muslim moors who were retailers along with chettis; Lighthouse Street or 'Zeeburgstraat' or 'Middelpuntstraat' named after the lighthouse which was destroyed in a fire in 1936; Hospital Street, the location of the Dutch Hospital, the house of the Surgeon and the Medical Garden; Leyn Baan Street or 'Leyenbahnstraat', the Old Rope-Walk Street, where coir rope was made; Church Street, named after a church which was demolished in the 17th century and also the location of the Dutch Reformed Church and All Saints Church; Parawa Street, named after the Parawa migrants from South India who were fishermen and traders; and Chando Street named after the toddy tappers and Dutch Burghers who owned coconut gardens and small ark distilleries.

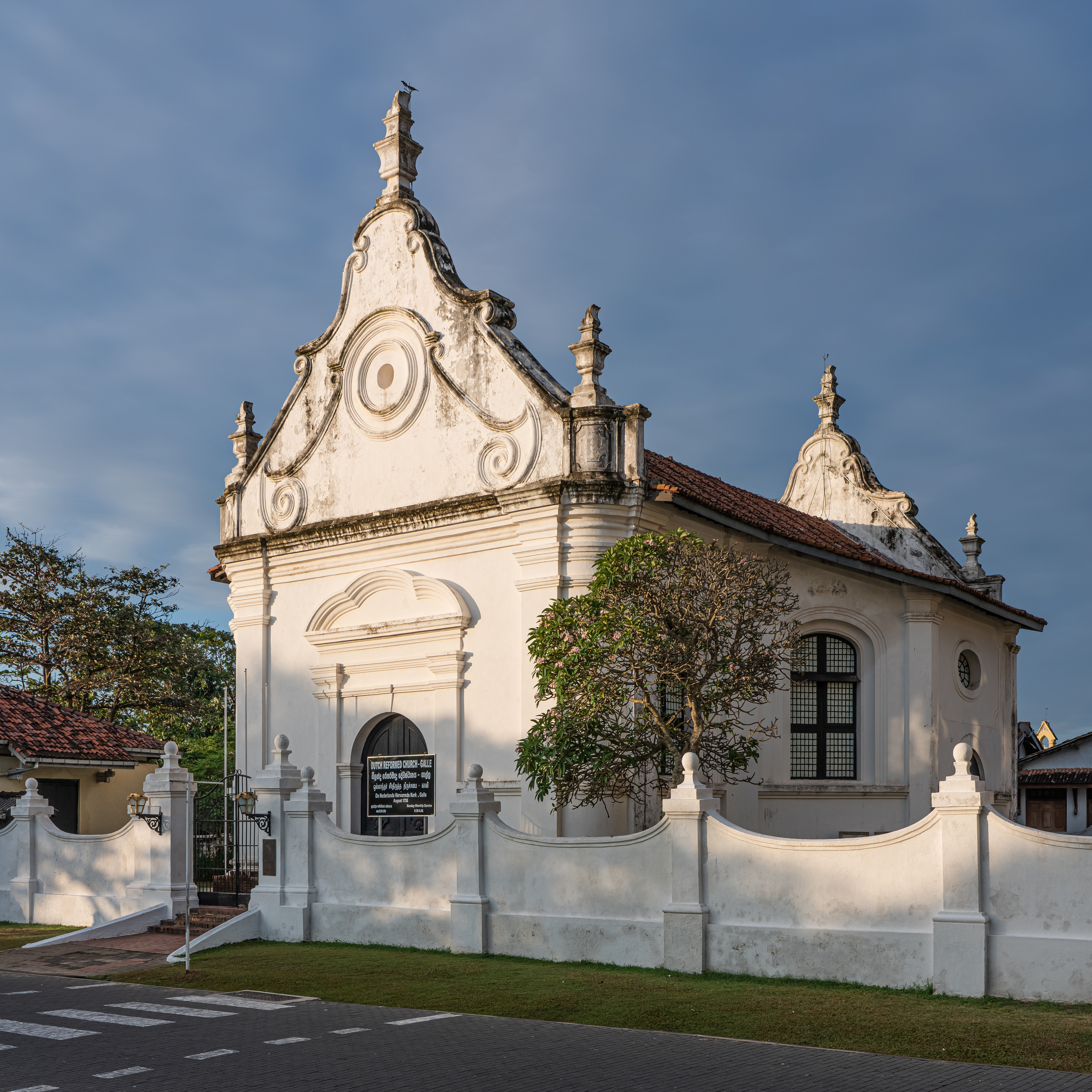
Dutch Reformed Church in Galle Fort

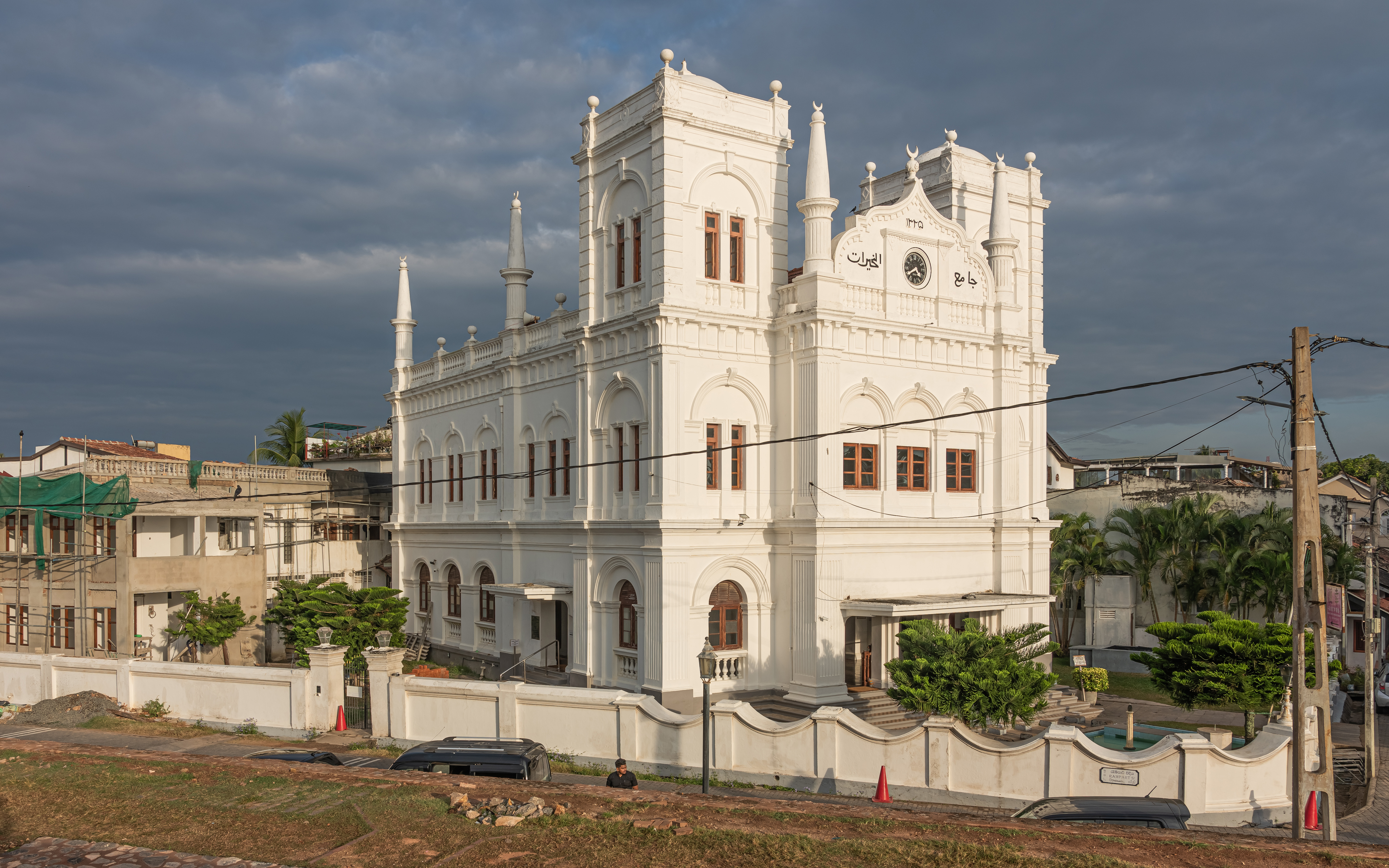
Meeran Mosque in Galle Fort

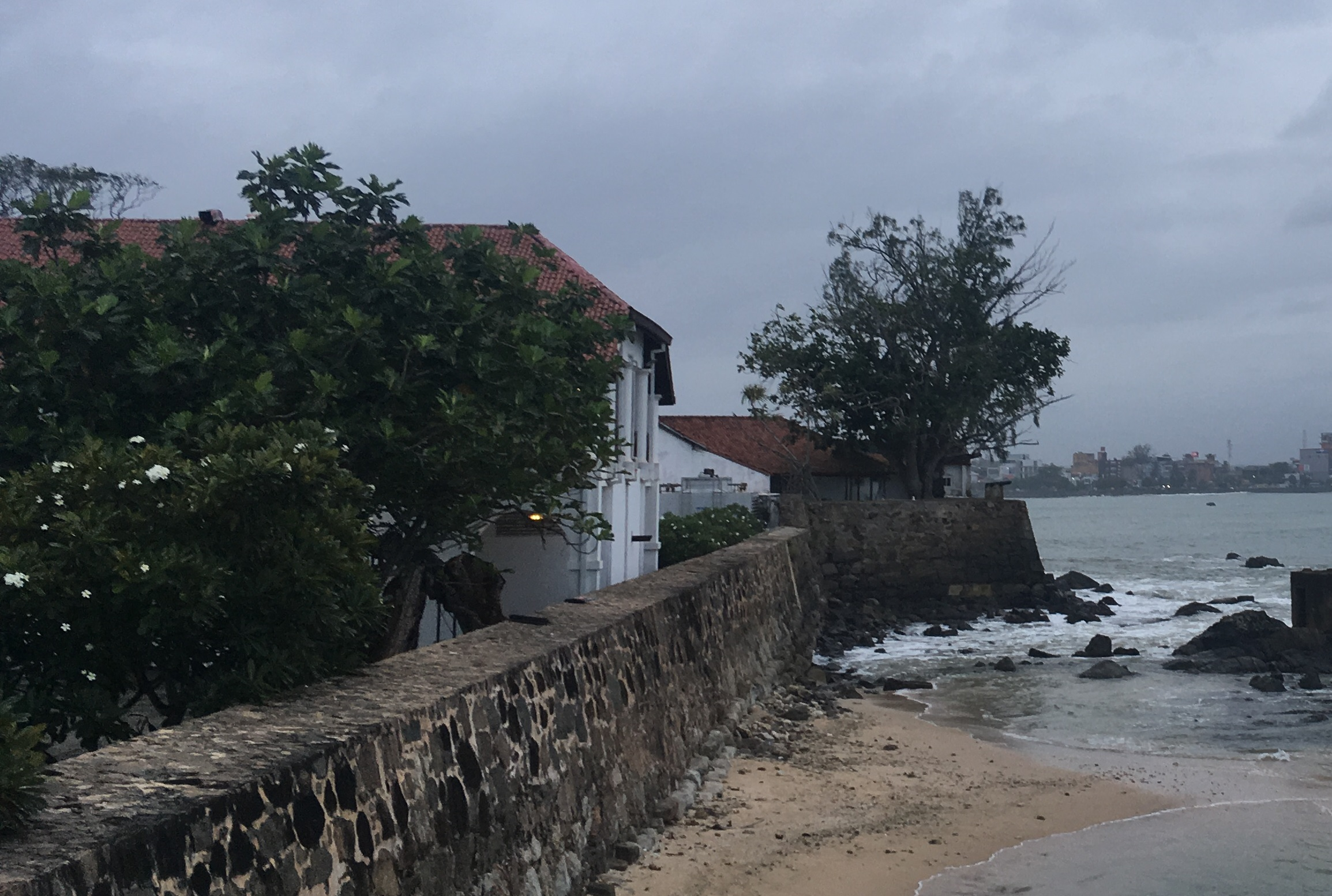
Akersloot Bastion with breadfruit tree

=== Landmarks ===
==== Groote Kerk (Dutch Reformed Church) ====
The Groote Kerk (Dutch Reformed Church) was built in 1640, and remodeled between 1752 and 1755. The church is paved with gravestones from the old Dutch cemetery. There is an old organ of 1760 vintage in the church where services are held and a pulpit made of calamander wood from Malaysia is used. Its historic belfry, dated 1707 and cast in 1709, rang every hour.

==== New Orient Hotel ====
The New Orient Hotel was originally built in 1694 for the exclusive use of the Dutch Governor and his staff. It was converted into a hotel in 1865, the New Orient Hotel, which catered to the European passengers traveling between Europe and Galle Port in the 19th century and in 2005 was modernised into a franchise of the Aman Resorts, named the Amangalla.

==== Breadfruit tree ====
The breadfruit (Artucarpus incisisus) tree was introduced in Galle first by the Dutch; reputedly the oldest breadfruit tree in Sri Lanka can be found at Akersloot Bastion in Galle Fort. It is popularly believed that the Dutch introduced breadfruit which is of 'heaty' nature hoping that it would either kill the local population or make them sick. However, in the story, the locals found by mixing the bread fruit with coconut they produced a neutral delicacy. This tree is now grown across the country.

==== Other landmarks ====
Other landmarks are the old Dutch government house, the residence of the Commander, the great warehouse near the old gate, built around 1669 to store spices and ship equipment (which now houses the National Maritime Archaeology Museum), the Old Dutch Hospital, the Meeran Jumma Mosque, built in 1904, the Buddhist temple built at the site of the Portuguese Roman Catholic church, the All Saints Anglican Church built in 1871, the 1882 Clock Tower, the Clan House and the 1939 Galle Lighthouse.

== Renovations ==
Following the disaster caused by the tsunami of 2004, which damaged many buildings, the Ministry of Cultural Affairs launched a project for renovation and reconstruction, but paying attention to the former architecture to retain a historical feel.

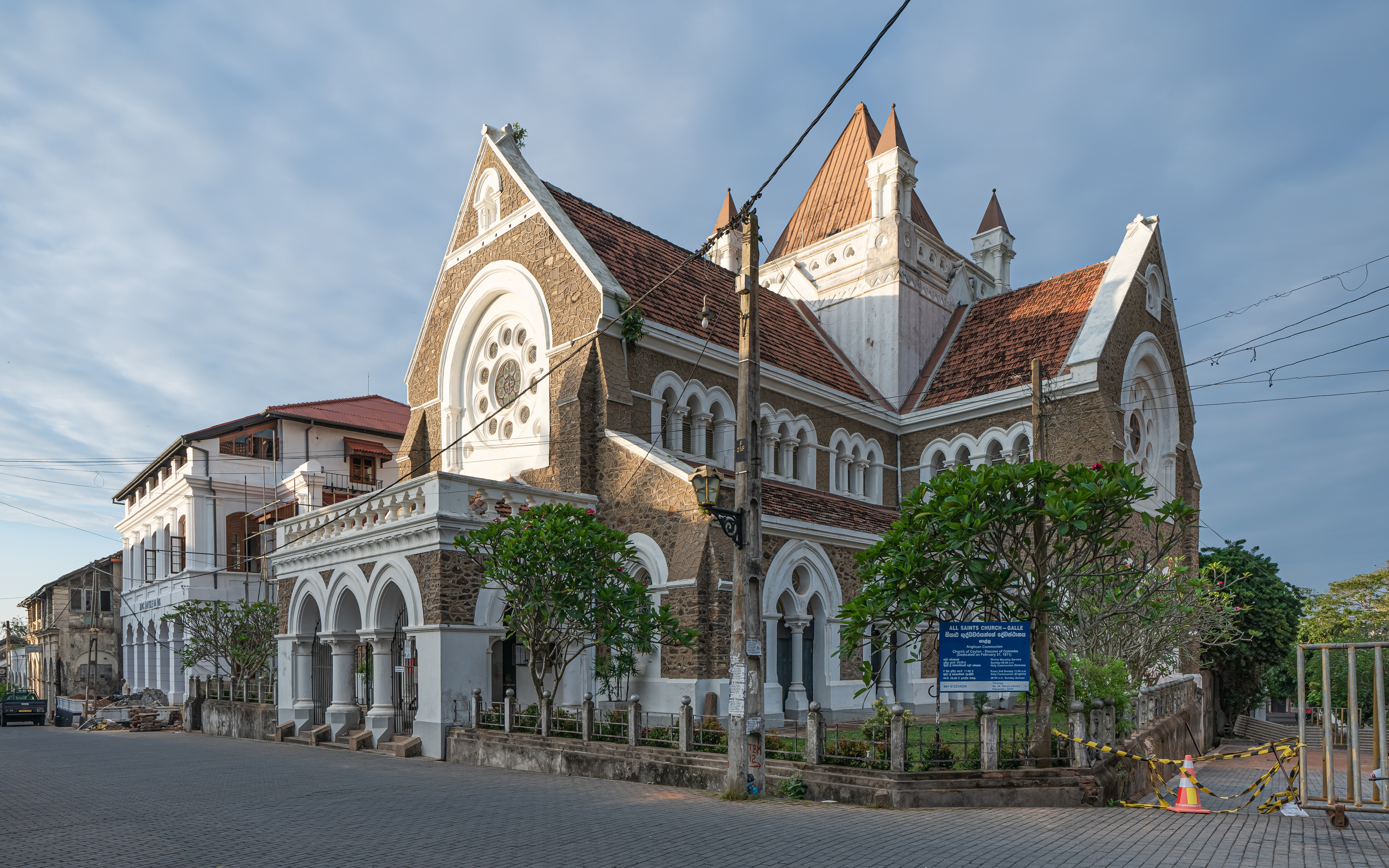
The refurbished All Saints' Church in Galle Fort

The Galle Fort has both Portuguese and Dutch era buildings, reflecting the bygone era of the colonial domination of the city. These buildings needed attention as many changes had taken place over the centuries. The Government of Sri Lanka, through its Galle Heritage Foundation under the Ministry of Cultural Affairs and National Heritage has taken the initiative of restoring some of the heritage buildings to their old glory. The restoration work has been financially supported by the Government of the Netherlands. The renovation work conforms to guidelines set by the Archeological Department of Sri Lanka. Technical guidance was provided by the Architectural Wing of the University of Moratuwa. Very many of the old town houses have been bought up by expatriates and rich Sri Lankans and Indians and renovated as holiday homes.

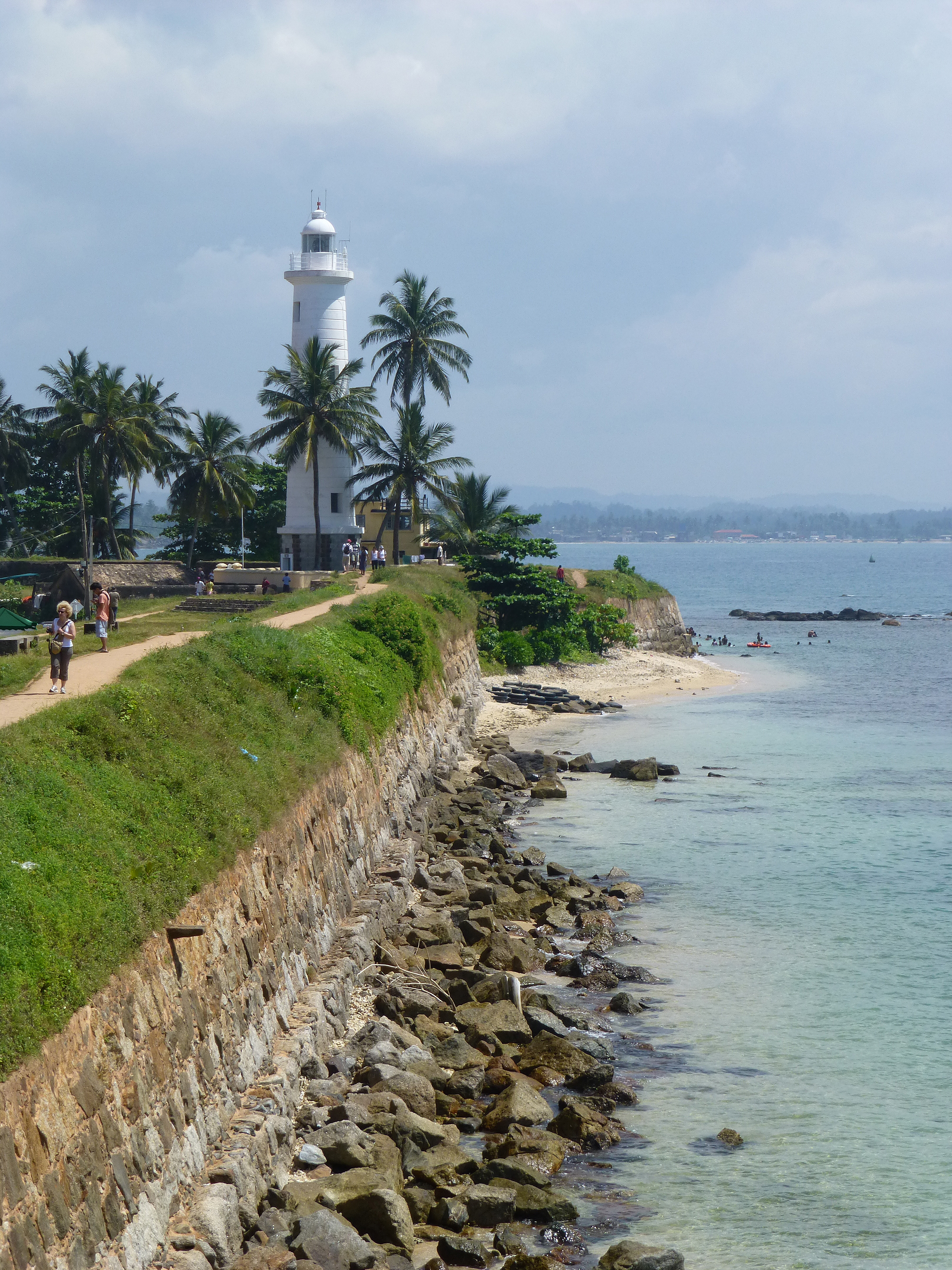
Galle Lighthouse and Galle Fort walls

The National Maritime Museum in Galle Fort area, near the old gate, was established in 1997 as an exclusive Maritime Archaeology Centre with active involvement of the Government of the Netherlands in the project in view of the findings that the Galle Harbour consisted of over 21 historical shipwreck sites and associated artifacts. In 2014 the Old Dutch Hospital following extensive restoration was re-opened as a dining and shopping complex

== See also ==
- All Saints' Church, Galle
- Amangalla
- Clan House, Galle
- Forts in Sri Lanka
- Galle Clock Tower
- Galle Fort Hotel
- Galle Fort Post Office
- Galle Lighthouse
- Groote Kerk, Galle
- Meeran Jumma Mosque
- National Maritime Museum (Galle)
- National Museum of Galle
- Old Dutch Hospital, Galle
- Siege of Galle (1640)
- World Heritage Sites of Sri Lanka
