= Galle Lighthouse =

Lighthouse in Sri Lanka

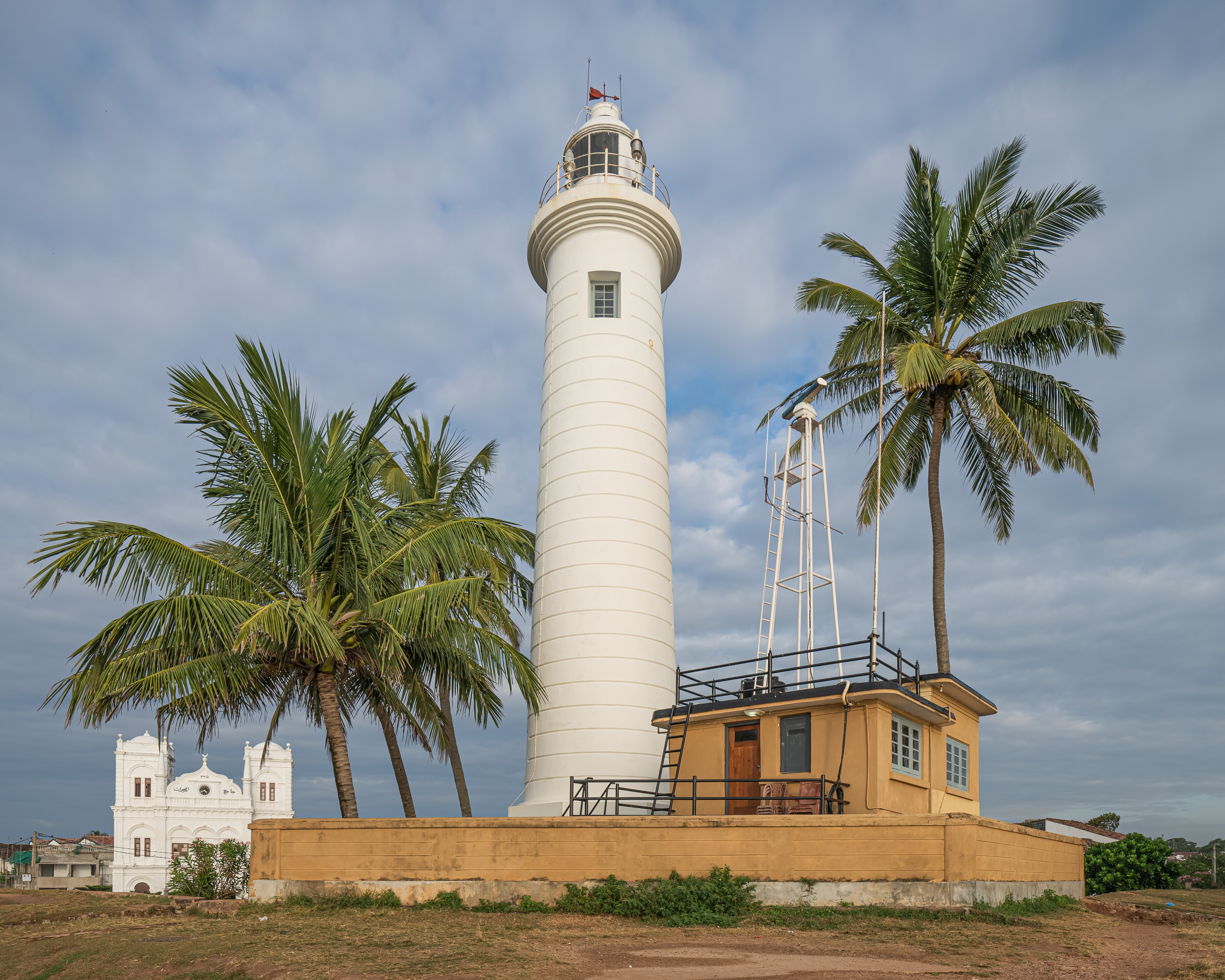
- Location: Galle Fort; Galle; Southern Province; Sri Lanka
- Coordinates: 6°01′28.4″N 80°13′09.7″E

Tower
- Constructed: 1848 (first)
- Construction: concrete and stone
- Automated: yes
- Height: 26.5 m (87 ft)
- Shape: cylindrical tower with balcony and lantern
- Markings: white tower and lantern
- Power source: mains electricity
- Operator: Sri Lanka Ports Authority

Light
- First lit: 1939 (current)
- Focal height: 28 m (92 ft)
- Range: 47 nmi (87 km; 54 mi)
- Characteristic: Fl (2) W 15s.

The Galle Lighthouse (also known as Pointe de Galle Light) is an onshore lighthouse in Galle, Sri Lanka and is operated and maintained by the Sri Lanka Ports Authority. It is Sri Lanka's oldest light station.

== History ==
Philippus Baldaeus, a Dutch minister who served in the area in the late 1650s, detailed his observations of Galle Harbour, in his work, A True and Exact Description of the most Celebrated East-India Coasts of Malabar and Coromandel and also of the isle of Ceylon (1672), stating that there was an iron cannon placed on the ramparts and a lantern to guide the sailors on top of the 28 feet above sea level rock which jutted out into the sea.

The first lighthouse at Galle was built by the British in 1848. It was a 24.4 m-high (80 ft) iron lighthouse, constructed from cast-iron plates, imported from England, designed by British architect Alexander Gordon and erected by Messrs. Robinson, Engineers of Pimlico. The lighthouse, painted white, was located on the southwest bastion (the Utrecht Bastion) of Galle Fort on the western side of Galle Harbor. It had a fixed-point light with prolate reflectors, which was visible for 19 km (12 mi). In July 1936 it was destroyed by fire.

The current 26.5 m-high (87 ft) concrete lighthouse was erected by the British about 100 m (330 ft) from the original site in 1939. The original light was furnished with a glass prism lens floating in a bath of mercury (to reduce friction) and was powered by a weight driven machine.

The light station is within the walls of the ancient Galle Fort, a UNESCO World Heritage Site and well known tourist attraction. The lighthouse is strategically located at the southern end of the promontory, built approximately 6 m (20 ft) above the road level on the ramparts, at what is known as the Point Utrecht Bastion, giving it full view of any ships entering Galle Harbour.

== See also ==
- List of lighthouses in Sri Lanka
