= Groote Kerk, Galle =

Church building in Galle, Sri Lanka

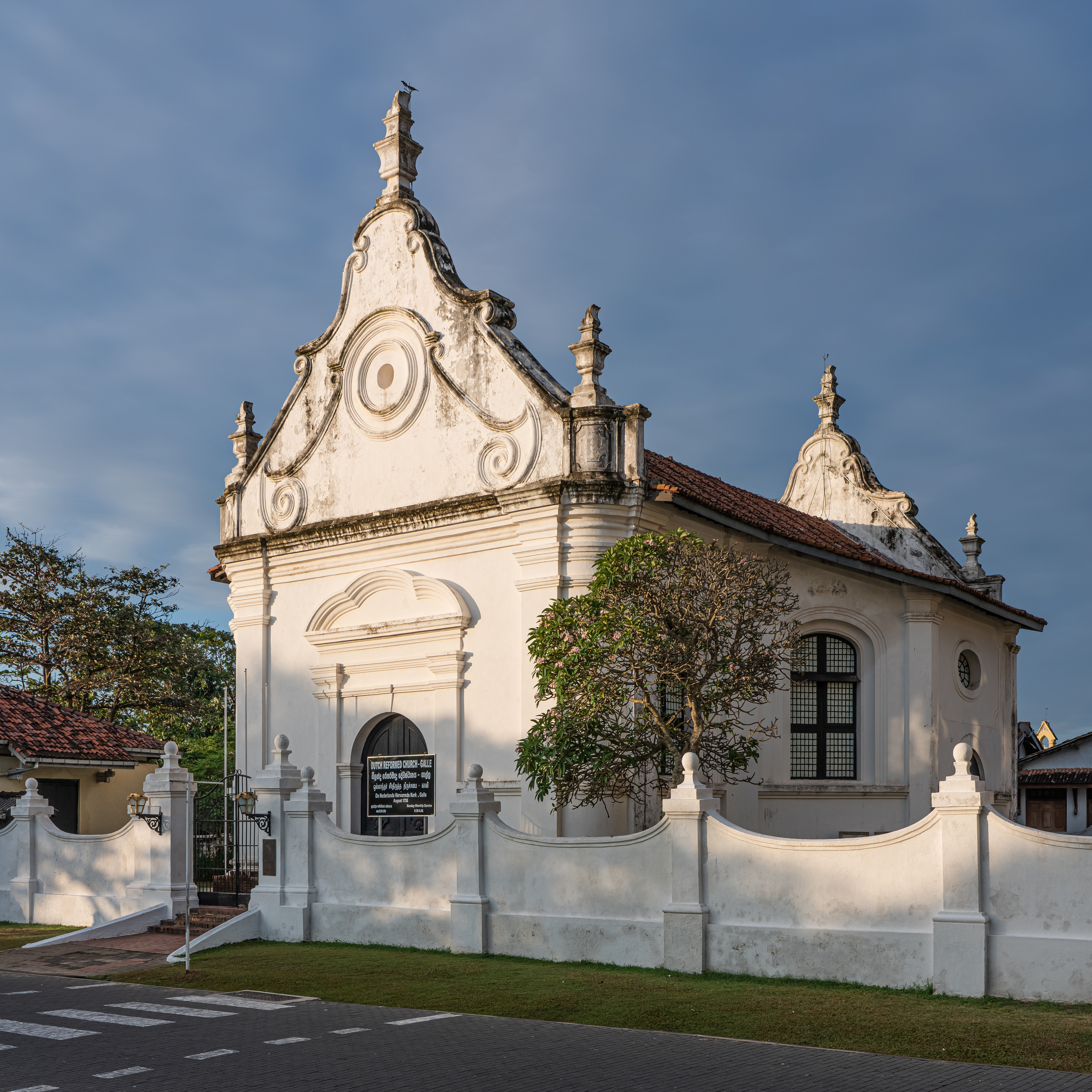

Religion
- Affiliation: Christian Reformed Church
- Year consecrated: 1755
- Status: Active

Location
- Location: Church Street, Galle fort
- Interactive map of Groote Kerk, Galle
- Coordinates: 6°1′41″N 80°13′1″E

Architecture
- Type: Church
- Style: Doric
- Completed: 1755

Website
- www.wolvendaal.org

The Groote Kerk or Dutch Reformed Church is located within the Galle Fort in Galle, Sri Lanka and is situated near the entrance to the fort. The church was built by the Dutch in 1755 and is one of the oldest Protestant churches still in use in the country.

== History ==
The existing church is believed to be the third building in the fort to serve the Dutch Reformed Church, the first being located near the Galle Clock Tower and the second, more elaborate building was constructed opposite the present church, with only the belfry remaining today. The present church is said to have been built on the site of a Portuguese Capuchin Convent.

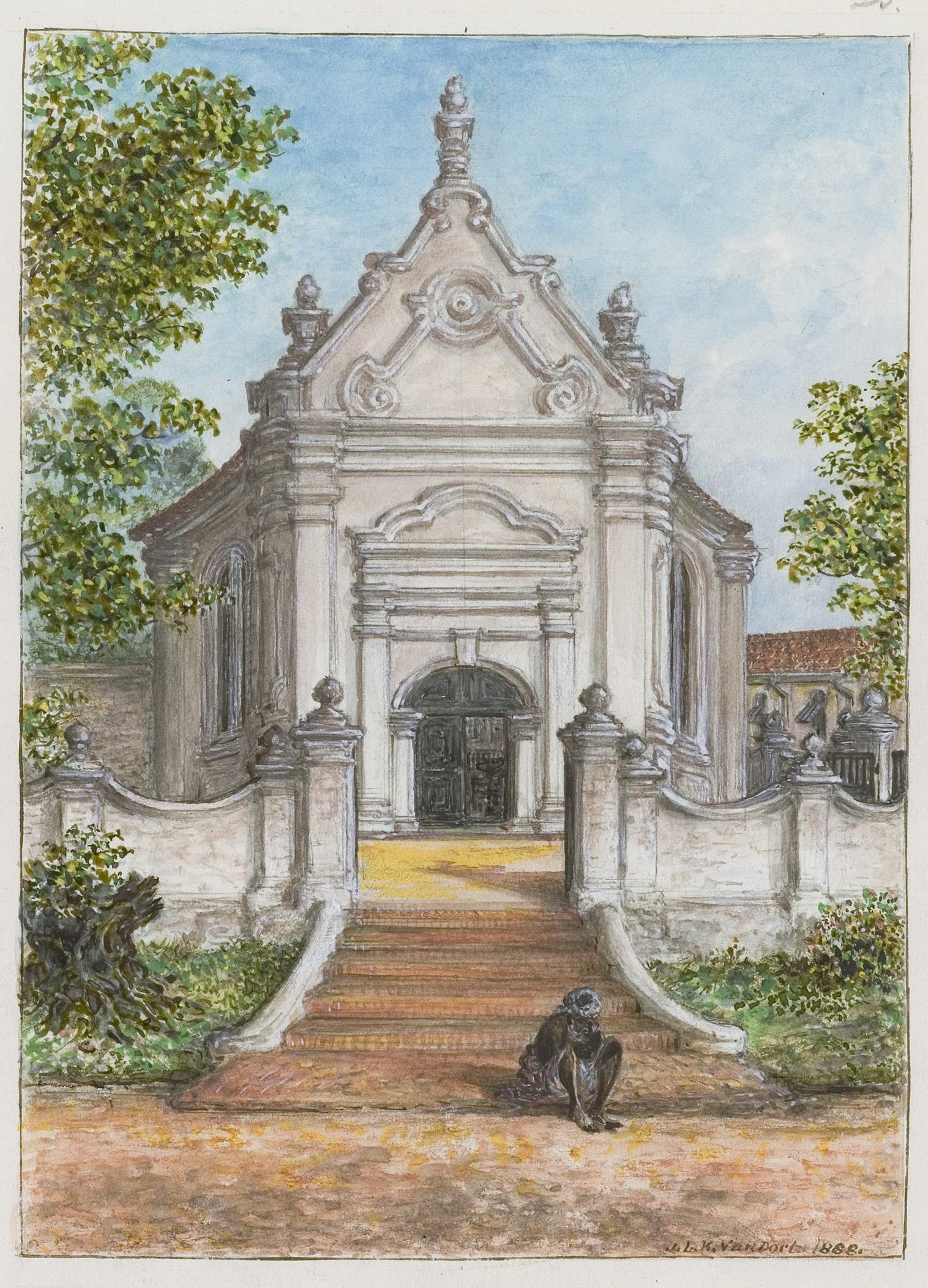
Watercolour painting of the Dutch Reformed Church, Galle by J. L. K. van Dort (1888)

The present church was built at the highest point in the Galle fort, which stands more than 12 m (39 ft) above sea level. The foundations of the church were initially laid in 1682 but further work stagnated for a number of decades. In 1755 the Commandeur of Galle, Casparus de Jong (Lord of Spanbroek), and his wife Geertruyda Adriana Le Grand donated the money for the church to be constructed as a thanksgiving for the birth of their daughter for which he had waited for many years. The child was not baptised until the church was completed. An entry in the Baptismal Register gives the date of baptism as 24 August 1755. In 1760 a second-hand organ from Colombo was installed in the church.

The church underwent various changes during the British Period. A stained glass window was built into the west façade of the church around 1830 and a communion rail was built in the south wing. At the beginning of the 20th century, a small organ was placed in the south wing. Around 1890, a canopy was built above the stained glass window to protect it from leaking.

=== Belfry ===
The church's detached belfry, which was erected in 1701, stands over the road from the church, at the corner of Queen's Street. The bell was cast in 1709 and was rung on Sundays to announce the services at the church.

== Architecture ==
The church was constructed in the Doric style of the period, in a similar manner to the Wolvendaal Church in Colombo, and like the church in Colombo is also in the form of a cruciform, only the transepts are shorter. Two arches separate them from the nave. The church has no central tower inside to bear the weight of the roof and as a result is compensated by the addition of two large dutch gables to the north and to the south. It is also decorated with an unusual double scroll moulding, unique to this church. The masonry gables are finished off with three flamed-like finials. The two large timber doors and stained glass windows provide light and ventilation. The high vaulted ceiling was originally painted blue and studded with golden stars. The main timber used for the roof was iron wood.

The wooden pulpit is built in an hexagonal shape with calamander panelling mixed with local satinwood. High pews were erected along the walls for the Commandeur, the Deacons and the Dutch East India Company (VOC) officials. The pews along the southern end were dismantled to accommodate the altar and communion rails of the Anglican community who were allowed to use the church from the time of the early British rule down to 1867. Presently, in place of the altar, an organ is located on this location.

== Restoration ==
The Groote Kerk was fully renovated with a financial grant from the Dutch Embassy. On 28 November 2004, the then President of Sri Lanka, Chandrika Kumaratunga officially inaugurated the renovated building in the presence of the Dutch Ambassador, Susan Blankhart, the President of the Dutch Reformed Church, Charley Jansz and numerous distinguished guests. The conservation programme for the church restoration won a 2005 UNESCO Asia Pacific Heritage Award for best practice.

The church did not suffer any damage from the tsunami caused by the 2004 Indian Ocean earthquake due to its relative height and protection by the walls of the Galle fort.
