= Forts in Sri Lanka =

Location of forts within Sri Lanka. Completely destroyed forts are marked by.

Forts in Sri Lanka date back thousands of years, with many being built by Sri Lankan kings. These include several walled cities. With the outset of colonial rule in the Indian Ocean, Sri Lanka was occupied by several major colonial empires that from time to time became the dominant power in the Indian Ocean. The colonists built several western-style forts, mostly in and around the coast of the island. The first to build colonial forts in Sri Lanka were the Portuguese; these forts were captured and later expanded by the Dutch. The British occupied these Dutch forts during the Napoleonic Wars.

Most of the colonial forts were garrisoned up until the early 20th century. The coastal forts had coastal artillery manned by the Ceylon Garrison Artillery during the two world wars. Most of these were abandoned by the military but retained civil administrative officers, while others retained military garrisons, which were more administrative than operational. Some were reoccupied by military units with the escalation of the Sri Lankan Civil War; Jaffna fort, for example, came under siege several times.

== Anuradhapura period ==
Image	Name	Founded	Abandoned	Location	Condition	Controlled by	Type	Notes
	Vijithapura	5th Century BC; Anuradhapura Kingdom		Central Province			Fortress City	(Note: It was the site of a major battle between the forces of Ellalan and Dutthagamani)
	Sigiriya	5th Century by Kashyapa I	495 CE	Dambulla, Central Province	Ruined	Government of Sri Lanka	Citadel	(Note: Royal Palace. Briefly used as an outpost of the Kingdom of Kandy in the 16th and 17th centuries.)
	Mapagala fortress			Central Province				(Note: Located to the south of Sigiriya is the Mapagala Fortress (‘Rock of the Viceroy’), a fortress with massive stone walls, which was built prior to Sigiriya.)

== Transitional period ==
=== Sitawaka forts ===
Image	Name	Founded	Abandoned	Location	Condition	Controlled by	Type	Notes
	Sitawaka fort			Avissawella, Western Province				
	Hanwella Fort			Hanwella, Western Province	Destroyed		Defence	

=== Portuguese forts ===
Image	Name	Founded	Abandoned	Location	Condition	Controlled by	Type	Notes
	Colombo fort	1518, 1554	1524, 1870	Colombo fort, Western Province	Destroyed	-	Defence	
	Fort Fredrick	1624	-	Trincomalee, Eastern Province	Good	Government of Sri Lanka	Defence	(Note: Later controlled by the Dutch and then the British)
	Batticaloa fort	1628		Batticaloa, Eastern Province	Good	Government of Sri Lanka	Defence	(Note: Captured by the Dutch in 1638)
	Arandora fort			Narangoda, North Western Province	Destroyed	-	Defence	(Note: Captured by the Dutch in 1665)
	Arippu fort			Arippu, Northern Province	Ruins	Government of Sri Lanka	Defence	(Note: Handed over to the Dutch in 1658)
	Delft Island fort			Neduntheevu, Northern Province	Ruins	Government of Sri Lanka	Defence	(Note: Later controlled by the Dutch)
	Elephant Pass fort	1776		Elephant Pass, Northern Province	Destroyed	-	Defence	(Note: Later controlled by the Dutch)
	Galle fort	1588	-	Galle, Southern Province	Good	Government of Sri Lanka	Defence	(Note: Captured and rebuilt by the Dutch from 1640)
	Haldummulla fort	1630		Haldummulla, Uva	Ruins	Government of Sri Lanka	Defence	
	Fort Hammenheil	1618		Jaffna Peninsula, Northern Province	Good	Government of Sri Lanka	Defence	(Note: Rebuilt by the Dutch in 1680)
	Jaffna fort	1618		Jaffna, Northern Province	Good	Government of Sri Lanka	Star fort	(Note: Captured and rebuilt by the Dutch in 1658)
	Kalutara fort	1655		Kalutara, Western Province	Ruins	Government of Sri Lanka	Defence	
	Kayts Island fort	1629		Kayts, Northern Province	Ruins	Government of Sri Lanka	Defence	
	Kotugodella fort	1630		Ettampitiya, Uva Province	Ruins		Defence	
	Mannar fort	1560		Mannar, Northern Province	Destroyed	Government of Sri Lanka	Defence	
	Matara fort	1550		Matara, Southern Province	Good	Government of Sri Lanka	Defence	(Note: Rebuilt by the Dutch after 1640)
	Menikkadawara fort	1599		Kegalle, Sabaragamuwa Province	Destroyed	Government of Sri Lanka	Defence	
	Negombo fort	1672		Negombo, Western Province	Ruins	Government of Sri Lanka	Defence	
	Pooneryn fort	16??		Pooneryn, Northern Province	Ruins	Government of Sri Lanka	Defence	
	Ratnapura fort	1618, 1620		Ratnapura, Sabaragamuwa Province	Destroyed	Government of Sri Lanka	Defence	
	Ruwanwella fort	1590s		Ruwanwella, Sabaragamuwa Province	Destroyed	Government of Sri Lanka	Defence	
	Hanwella fort	1597		Hanwella, Western Province	Destroyed	Government of Sri Lanka	Defence	

== Kandyan period ==
=== Kandyan forts ===
Image	Name	Founded	Abandoned	Location	Condition	Controlled by	Type	Notes
	Balana fort			Balana, Central Province	Ruined		Defence	
	Hunnasgiriya Fort			Hunnasgiriya, Central Province	Ruined		Defence	
	Welanhinna Ancient Fort			Diyatalawa, Uva Province	Destroyed			

=== Dutch forts ===
Image	Name	Founded	Abandoned	Location	Condition	Controlled by	Type	Notes
	Fort Hammenheil	1618	-	Jaffna Peninsula, Northern Province	Good	Government of Sri Lanka	Defence	
	Koddiyar fort	1622		Muttur, Eastern Province	Destroyed		Defence	
	Katuwana Fort	1646	-	Katuwana, Southern Province	Good	Government of Sri Lanka	Defence	
	Kalpitiya fort	1667–76	-	Kalpitiya, North Western Province	Good	Government of Sri Lanka	Defence	(Note: In 1795 the fort was surrendered to the British)
	Mullaitivu fort	1715		Mullaitivu, Northern Province	Ruins		Defence	(Note: Rebuilt by British during their occupation of the country in 1795)
	Star fort	1763–65	-	Matara, Southern Province	Good	Government of Sri Lanka	Star fort	
	Fort Beschutter			Elephant Pass, Northern Province	Destroyed	Government of Sri Lanka	Defence	
	Fort Ostenburg			Trincomalee, Eastern Province	Ruins	Government of Sri Lanka	Defence	(Note: Later surrendered to the British 1795)
	Fort Pyl			Elephant Pass, Northern Province	Ruins	Government of Sri Lanka	Defence	
	Point Pedro fort			Point Pedro, Northern Province	Destroyed		Defence	(Note: Later surrendered to the British 1795)
	Tangalle fort			Tangalle, Southern Province	Good	Government of Sri Lanka	Defence	(Note: The fort is still being used as a prison by the Department of Prisons.)

=== British forts ===
Image	Name	Founded	Abandoned	Location	Condition	Controlled by	Type	Notes
	Martello tower	1801-03		Hambantota, Southern Province	Good	Government of Sri Lanka	Defence tower	
	Fort MacDowall	1803		Matale Central Province				(Note: Outpost during the Kandyan Wars)
