= List of Dutch colonial buildings in Sri Lanka =

List of notable Dutch colonial buildings built by or during the Dutch Governorate of Ceylon in present-day Sri Lanka. The Dutch Ceylon was a Governorate established by the Dutch East India Company and lasted from 1640 until 1796. During this period many Dutch style buildings and structures were built that exist to this day, many other smaller buildings and houses also exist throughout the country.

== List ==
Dutch colonial buildings in Sri Lanka. Completely destroyed or abandoned buildings are marked by.

Image	Name	Built	Location	Type	Notes
	Koddiyar fort	1622	Muttur, Eastern Province	Defensive fort	Destroyed
	Katuwana Fort	1646	Katuwana, Southern Province	Defensive fort	Abandoned
	Kalpitiya fort	1646	Kalpitiya, North Western Province	Defensive fort	In use
	Old Dutch Hospital	1600s	Galle, Southern Province	Hospital	In use
	Dutch Commissariat	1656	Galle, Southern Province	Government building	In use
	Dutch Governors Office	1656	Colombo, Western Province	Government building	In use
	Point Pedro fort	1665	Point Pedro, Northern Province	Defensive fort	Destroyed
	Dutch Warehouse	1671	Galle, Southern Province	Government building	In use
	Dutch prison	1676	Colombo, Western Province	Prison	In use
	Old Colombo Dutch Hospital	1681	Colombo, Western Province	Hospital	In use
	Dutch government house	1684	Galle, Southern Province	Government building	In use
	Dutch Seminary, Pettah	1704	Pettah, Western Province	Seminary	In use
	Dutch Reformed Church, Matara	1706	Matara, Southern Province	Church	In use
	Dutch Reformed Church, Kalpitiya	1706	Kalpitiya, North Western Province	Church	In use
	Kruys Church	1706	Jaffna, Northern Province	Church	In use
	Mullaitivu fort	1715	Mullaitivu, Northern Province	Defensive fort	Destroyed
	Wolvendaal Church	1749	Colombo, Western Province	Church	In use
	Groote Kerk, Galle	1755	Galle, Southern Province	Church	In use
	Star fort	1763	Matara, Southern Province	Defensive fort	In use
	Old Nupe Market	1775	Matara, Southern Province	Market building	In use
	St. Lucia's Cathedral	1782	Kotahena, Western Province	Church	In use
	Fort Ostenburg		Trincomalee, Eastern Province	Defensive fort	Abandoned
	Tangalle fort		Tangalle, Southern Province	Defensive fort	In use

== See also ==
- Forts in Sri Lanka
