= Maritime and Naval History Museum, Trincomalee =

Maritime and Naval History Museum
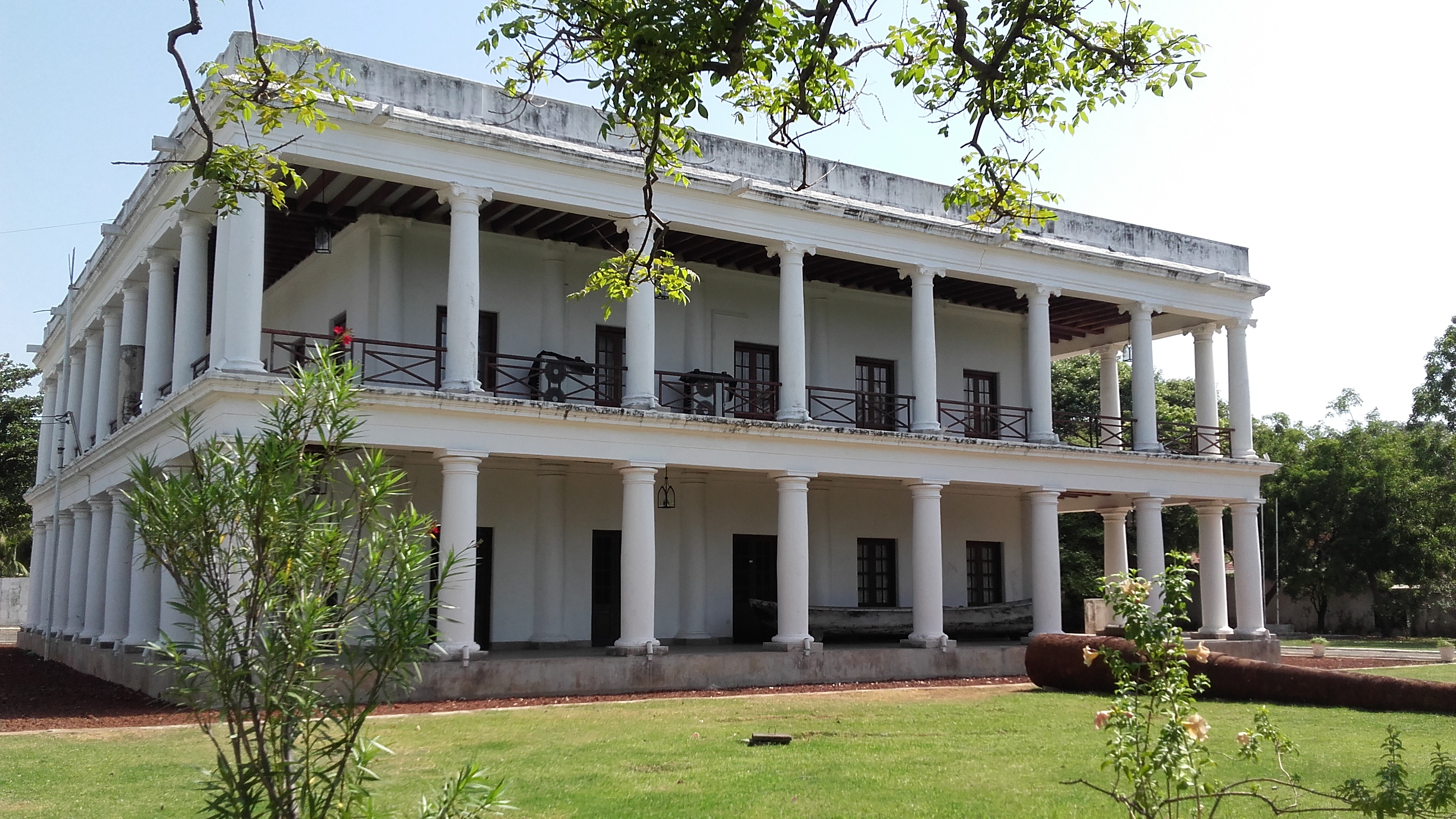
- The Museum building

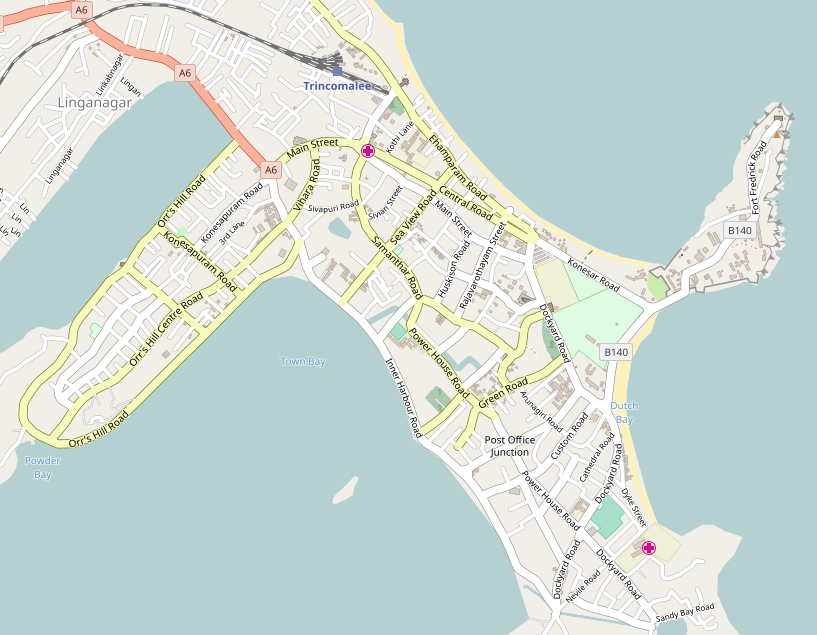
- Location in central Trincomalee
- Established: 3 February 2013
- Location: Lavender Lane, Trincomalee, Sri Lanka
- Coordinates: 8°34′11.3″N 81°14′14.8″E
- Type: Maritime museum
- Website: http://www.navy.lk/

The Maritime and Naval History Museum is a Maritime museum located at Trincomalee, Sri Lanka. It has been established near to Fort Fredrick where the Dutch first landed to the island in the 16th century.

The museum was declared open on 3 February 2013 by then Sri Lanka president Mahinda Rajapaksa coincide with the country's 65th Independence Day celebrations. The museum is used to display country's maritime history, marine biodiversity and information of the history of the local Naval affairs.

== Museum building ==
The museum has been established in a 17th-century building used as the official residence of the Dutch Naval Commissioner during the Dutch ruling period from 1602 to 1795 and from 1795 to 1948 it had been used as the Urban Commissioner's residence. In 2013 the building was renovated with the assistance of Government of the Netherlands to establish the museum and conservation of the museum building was directed by the Sri Lanka Archaeology Department and the Museums Department.

== See also ==
- Colombo Port Maritime Museum
- National Maritime Museum (Galle)
