= Haldummulla fort =

17th Century Portuguese fort in Sri Lanka

Haldummulla Fort
- Badulla, Sri Lanka

Site information
- Type: Defence fort
- Condition: Ruins

Location
- Sri Lanka
- Coordinates: 6.764350°N 80.882657°E

Site history
- Built by: Portuguese

Haldummulla Fort (Sinhala: හල්දුම්මුල්ල පැරණි බලකොටුව Haldummulla Pærani Balakotuwa; Tamil: ஹல்தும்முல்லைக் கோட்டை, romanized: Haltum'mullaik Kōṭṭai), was a fort built by the Portuguese in Haldummulla, Badulla. The 17th century fort was completely destroyed except the foundations, which can still be seen today in the forestry hill area. It served as a frontier post and staging post for Colombo. It provided a good view coverage of the surrounding areas.

== See also ==
- Forts in Sri Lanka
- Kotugodella fort
