= Batticaloa Fort =

1628 fort in Eastern Province, Sri Lanka

Batticaloa Fort Portuguese/Dutch Fort
- Part of Batticaloa
- Batticaloa, Sri Lanka
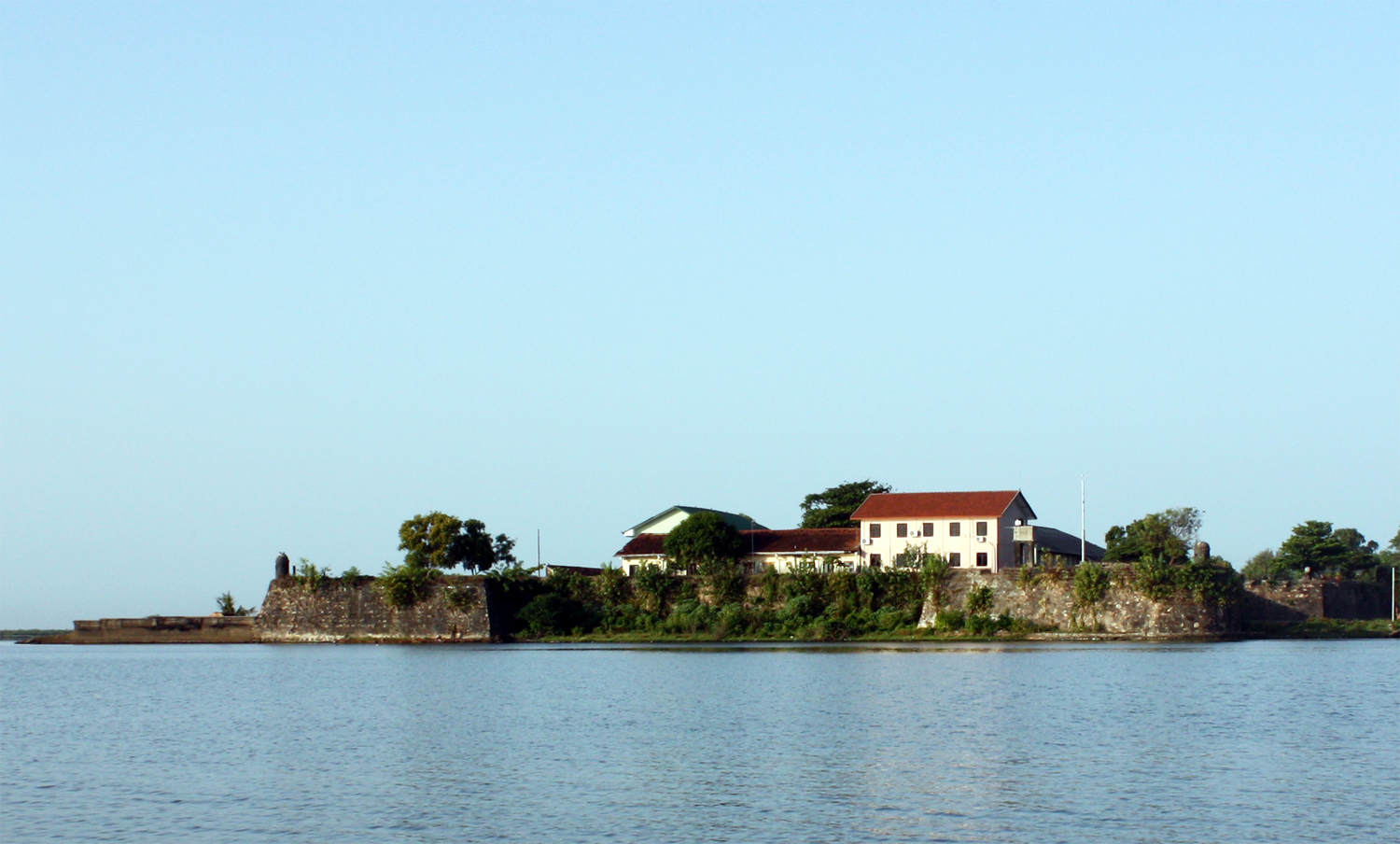
- Batticaloa Fort

Site information
- Type: Defence fort
- Controlled by: Government of Sri Lanka
- Open to the public: Yes
- Condition: Good

Location
- Location in central Batticaloa
- Location within Central Batticaloa
- Coordinates: 7.711901°N 81.702377°E

Site history
- Built: 1628
- Built by: Portuguese and Dutch
- Materials: Granite Stones and coral
- Battles/wars: Several battles

Archaeological Protected Monument of Sri Lanka

The Batticaloa Fort (Tamil: மட்டக்களப்புக் கோட்டை, romanized: Maṭṭakkaḷappuk Kōṭṭai; Sinhala: මඩකලපුව බලකොටුව, romanized: Madakalapuwa Balakotuwa) was built by the Portuguese in 1628 and was captured by the Dutch on 18 May 1638. From 1795, the fort was used by the British.

The fort has a structure of four bastions and is protected by the Batticaloa Lagoon on two sides and a canal on the other two sides. The fort is still in reasonable condition and currently houses several local administrative departments of the Sri Lanka government in new buildings, which are located within the old structure.

== Timeline ==
Timeline of Batticaloa fort in colonial time.

- 1622 – Construction begun by Portuguese
- 1628 – Construction completed
- 1638 – Dutch captured
- 1639 – Fort destroyed by Dutch
- 1665 – Reconstruction started
- 1682 – Renovation
- 1707 – Front bastion and complex completed
- 1766 – Ceded to Kandyan kingdom
- 1796 – Captured by British

== See also ==
- Forts of Sri Lanka
- Batticaloa Gate

== Picture gallery ==
Batticaloa fort

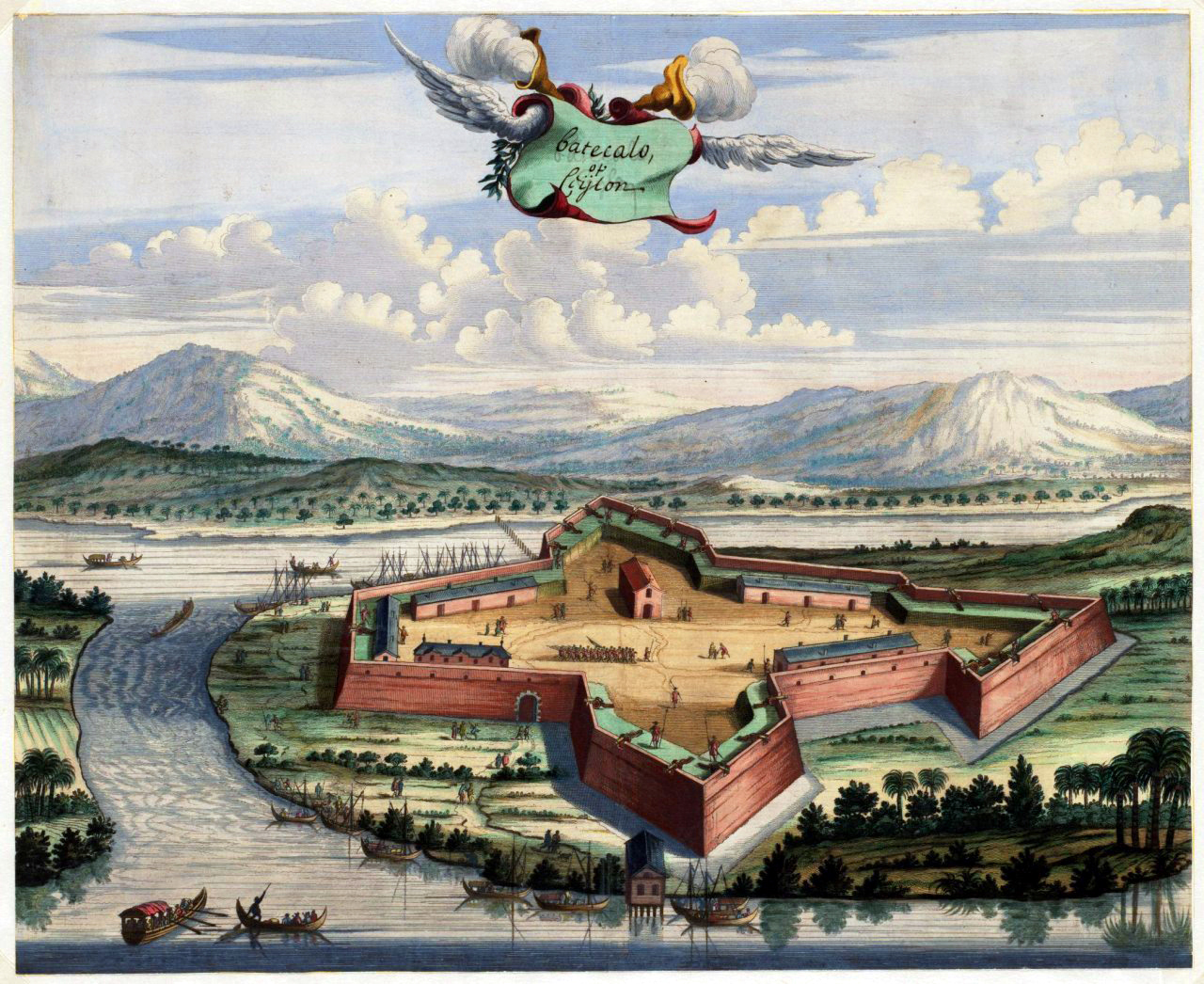
Antique print of the Batticaloa Fort by Baldaeus, 1672

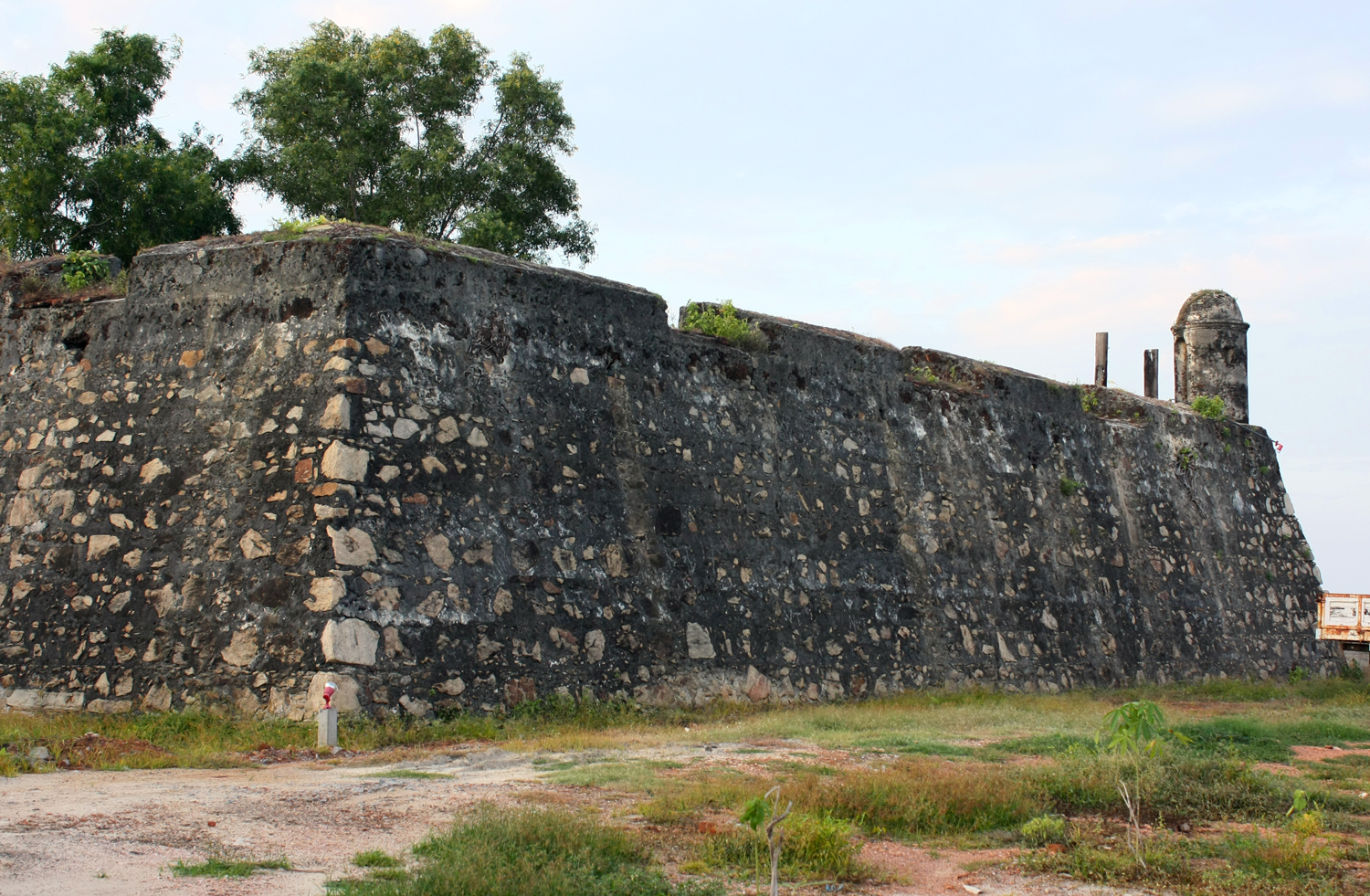
A view from the main entrance (south-east)

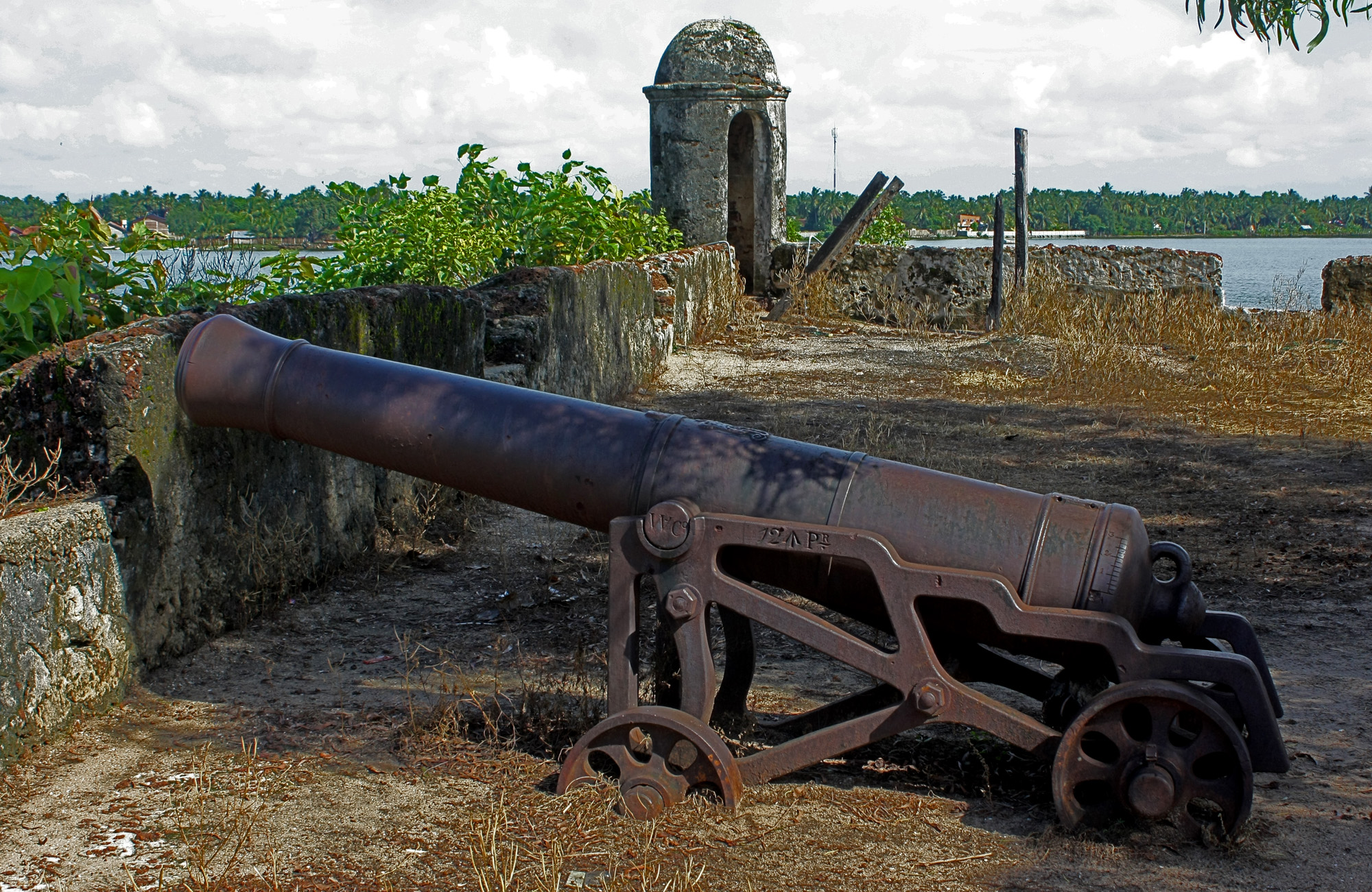
Cannon at the top, looking towards Kallady bridge/Indian Ocean. Watchtower in one of the bastions
