= 2014 Badulla landslide =

2014 landslide in Badulla, Sri Lanka

Coordinates: 6.759951°N 81.022507°E

2014 Koslanda landslide
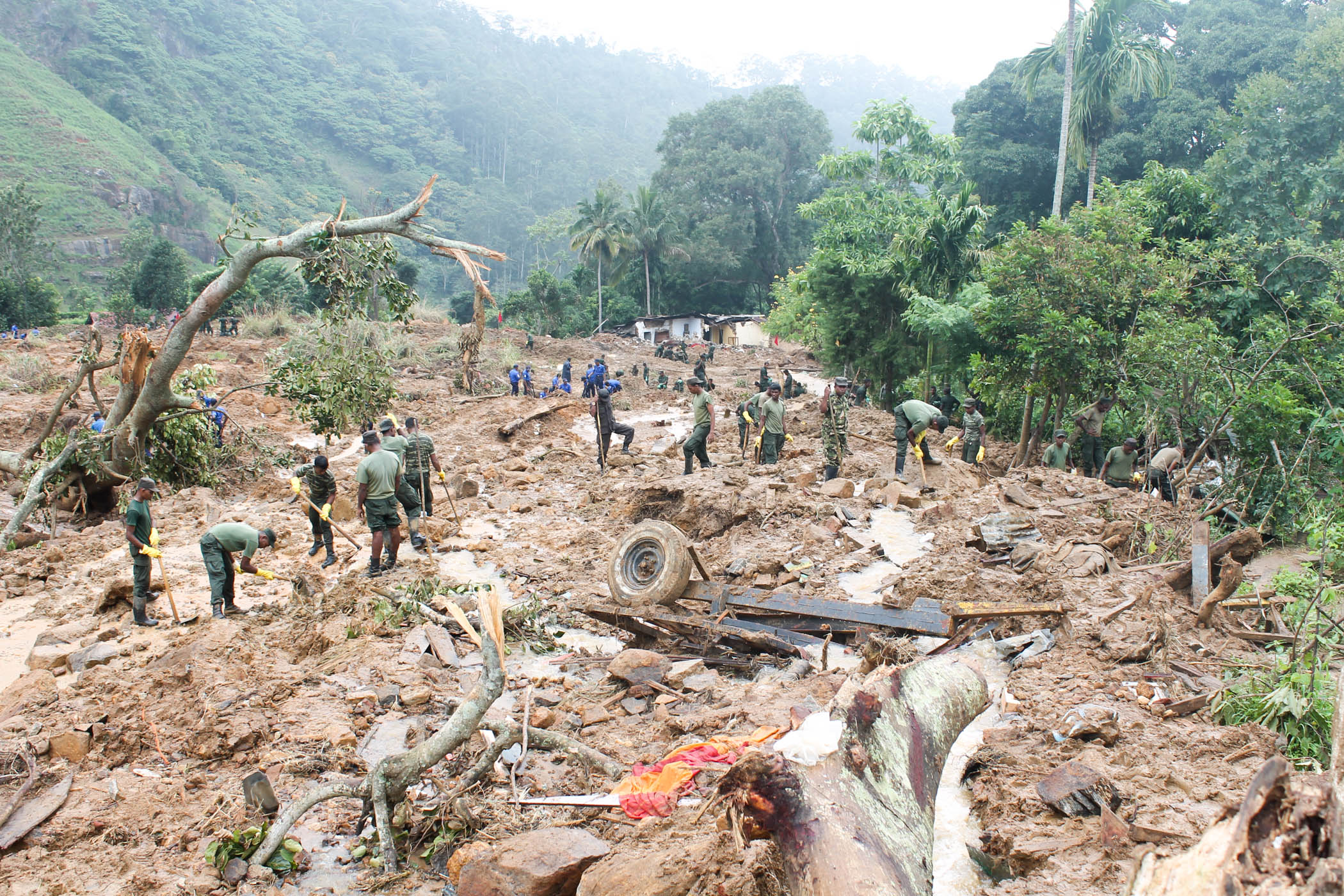
- Aftermath of the landslide
- Date: 29 October 2014
- Time: 7:30 am (local time)
- Location: Koslanda, Haldummulla, Sri Lanka
- Cause: Landslide due to heavy rain
- Deaths: 16 (confirmed)
- Missing: 192
- Property damage: 150 houses destroyed, infrastructure damage

At 7:30 am on 29 October 2014, a landslide struck the Sri Lanka district of Badulla, killing at least 16 people and leaving an estimated 200 missing. The landslide was triggered by monsoon rains, and occurred at about 7:30 AM local time.

== Cause ==
The landslide occurred in a hilly region, hitting the village of Koslanda in the Haldummulla division, 190 kilometres (120 mi) from the capital, Colombo. The landslide was triggered by monsoon rains and was about 3 kilometres (1.9 mi) long. According to Sri Lanka's National Building Research Organisation, it had issued a warning of possible landslides on the night of 28 October, but the Disaster Management Center (DMC), which was responsible for broadcasting the warning, had failed to deliver to the Badulla area; the DMC denied the claim, saying it had sent the warning but residents were not able to evacuate before the slide occurred.

Disaster Management Minister Mahinda Amaraweera said that residents in the area had previously been advised to leave in 2005 and 2012 because of the landslide risk.

== Casualties ==
Initial reports indicated that as many as 300 people were missing, while officials said that six bodies had been found on the day of the slide. The following day, however, the number of missing was lowered to 192, while the number of bodies found had been reduced to three, according to Pradeep Kodippili, an official at the country's Disaster Management Center (DMC-SL). However, as rescue efforts continued on the 30th, the number of confirmed dead rose to 16, while officials said that it was unlikely any of the missing would be found alive. The confusion over the number of missing was compounded by the destruction of a local office, which had contained records of the area's population.

Physical damage caused by the slide included some 150 houses buried, as well as several road and railroad washouts.

== Rescue efforts ==
Several hundred rescue workers, including government personnel, local aid workers and other volunteers, reached the site within a day of the slide, as well as 500 military troops. Heavy equipment was later brought in, as well as an additional 200 troops, by the 30th. Continued rain, as well as unstable terrain due to ground saturation, impeded rescue efforts, and late in the day on the 30th, the entire operation was suspended overnight due to rain. Following the slide, authorities ordered several hundred residents of nearby communities to evacuate due to the risk of further landslides.

Two secure centres were set up at Koslanda Tamil School and Poonagala Tamil School. On 30 October 2014 the centres accommodated 522 and 317 people, respectively.

== Recovery ==
On the 31 October DMC-SL issued a document outlining short, medium and long term plans for recovering the village including replacement "resilient buildings."

== See also ==
- List of landslides
