= Kotugodella fort =

Portuguese Fort

Kotugodella Fort
- Haldummulla, Sri Lanka

Site information
- Type: Defence fort
- Condition: Ruins

Site history
- Built by: Portuguese

Kotugodella Fort (Sinhala: කොටුගොඩැල්ල බලකොටුව), also known as Katugodalla Fort or Katugodælla Balakotuwa, was a Portuguese fort, located near Haldummulla. In 1630 the Portuguese, under the command of Constantino de Sá de Noronha attempted to use the ldalgashinna pass to force a way into the Uva. The fort was used as a staging post for troops in the attack.

The fort is 5 km (3 mi) south of the Idalgashinna railway station, within the Needwood tea plantation. All that remains of the fort are the stone foundations of the semi-circular bastions.

The fort was declared a protected archaeological site in November 2002.

== See also ==
- Forts in Sri Lanka
- Haldummulla fort
