= Kayts Island Fort =

- Kayts, Sri Lanka
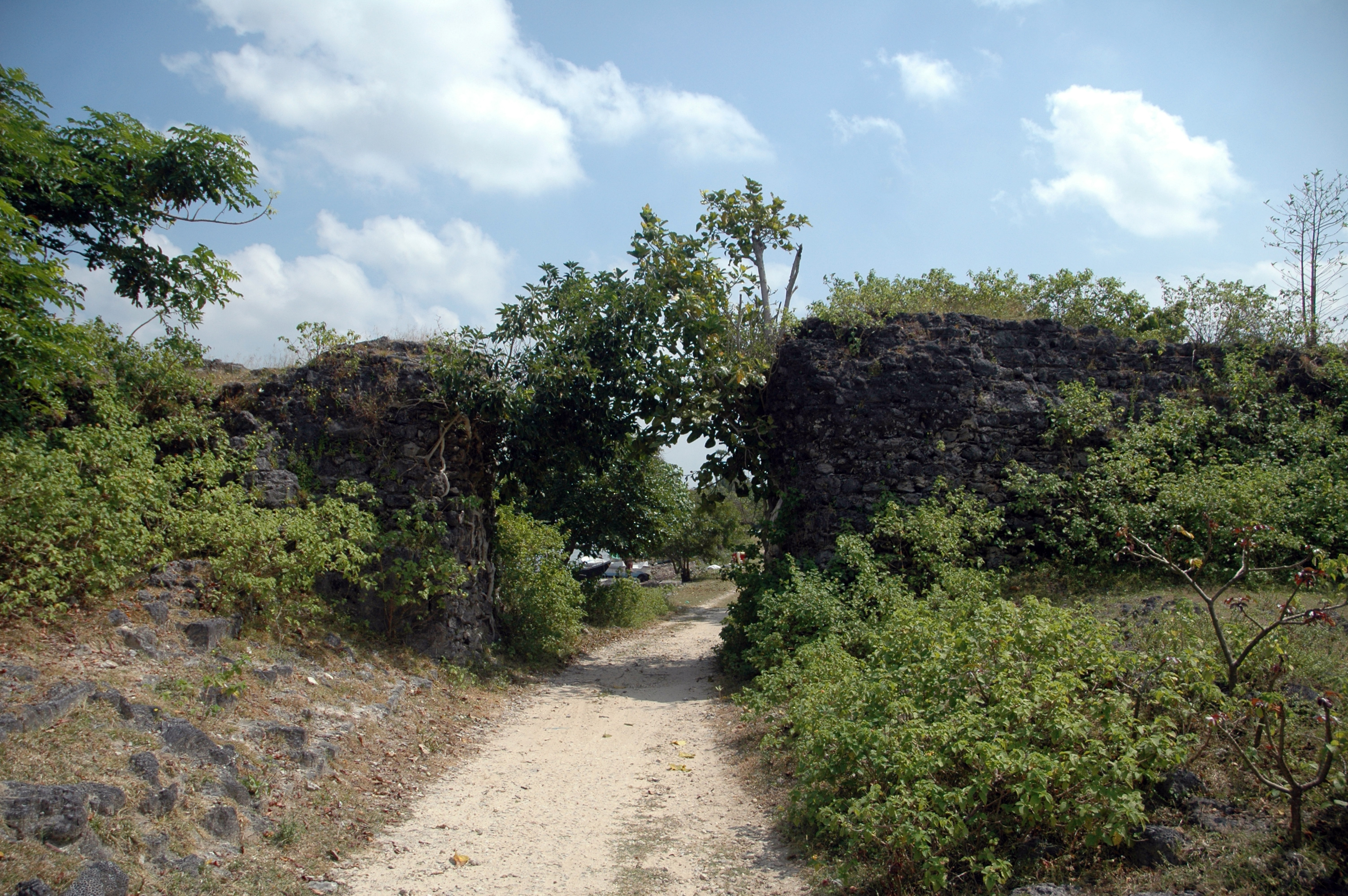
- Ruins of Kayts Island Fort

Site information
- Type: Defence fort
- Condition: Ruins

Location
- Coordinates: 9.700808°N 79.852035°E

Site history
- Built: 1629
- Built by: Portuguese
- Materials: Granite Stones and coral

The Kayts Island Fort (Tamil: ஊர்காவற்றுறைக் கோட்டை, romanized: Ūrkāvaṟṟuṟaik Kōṭṭai; Sinhala: කයිට්ස් දූපත් බලකොටුව Kayits Dupath Balakotuwa) was built by the Portuguese in 1629 and was abandoned in 1651. In the late 1600s, Dutch controlled the fort when they took over the Kayts island. During the Dutch rule, it was not normal to undergo restoration like the former forts of Portugal.

The horseshoe shaped fort with four circular bastions was built to protect Jaffna Peninsula like other Portuguese forts in the peninsula. There was one of the primary commercial ports called “Urundai” beside the fort. Therefore, the fort was known as “Urundai Fort”. The Tamil word “Urundai” literally means sphere or round-shape.

== See also ==
- Forts of Sri Lanka
