= Fort Hammenhiel =

- Jaffna Peninsula, Sri Lanka
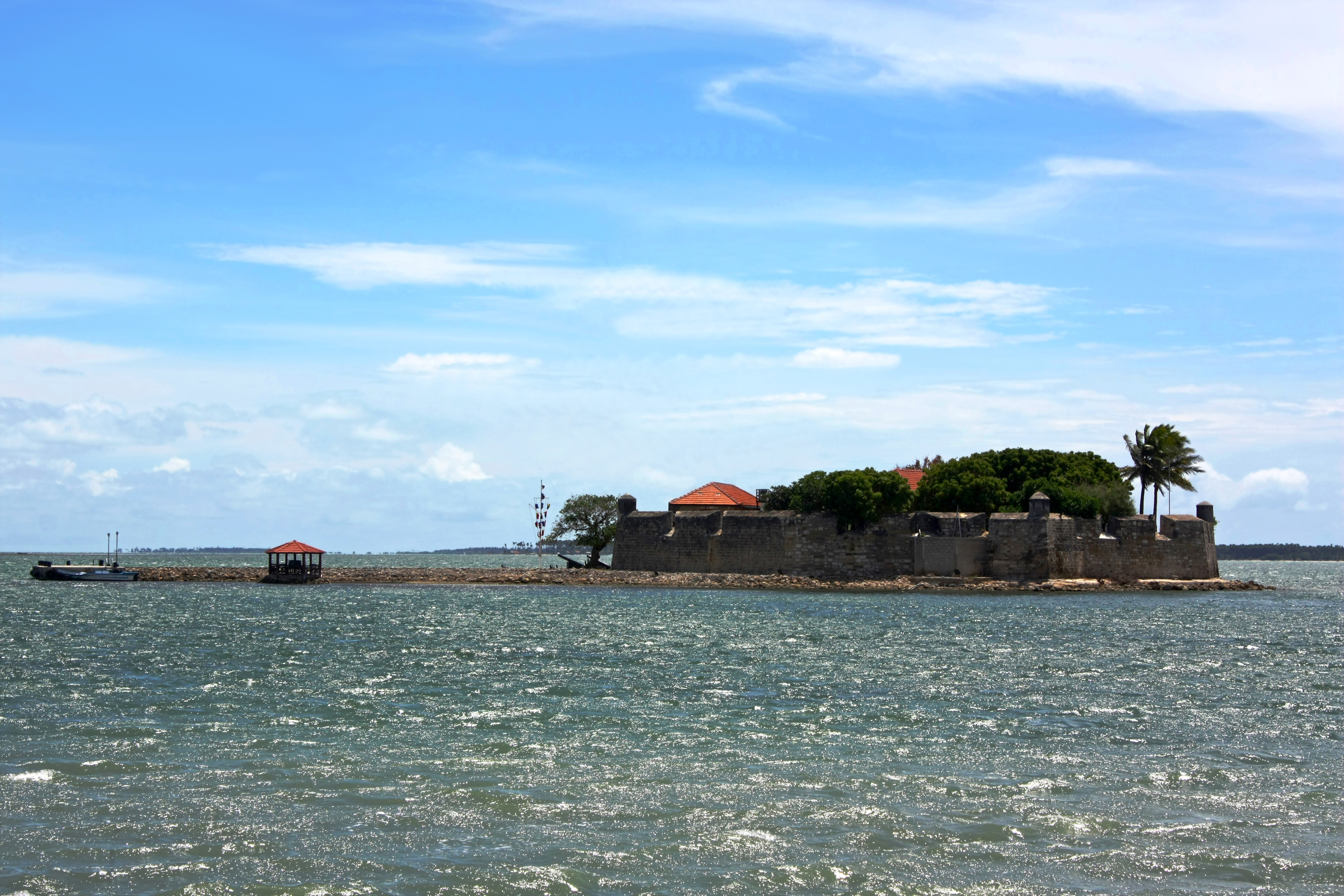
- Fort Hammenhiel seen from Karainagar

Site information
- Type: Defence fort
- Controlled by: Sri Lankan Navy
- Condition: Good

Location
- Location within Northern Province
- Coordinates: 9.711696°N 79.848006°E

Site history
- Built: 1618
- Built by: Portuguese and Dutch
- Materials: Granite Stones and coral

Fort Hammenhiel (Tamil: அம்மன்னீல் கோட்டை, romanized: Am'maṉṉīl Kōṭṭai; Sinhala: හැමන්හිල් බලකොටුව, romanized: Hæminanhil Balakotuwa) is a fort built around a small island between the islands of Kayts and Karaitivu of Jaffna Peninsula in Northern Sri Lanka.

== History ==
The Portuguese built the fort, to guard the entrance to the Jaffna peninsula, in the mid 17th century of quarried coral naming it Fortaleza do Caes (Fort Royal). The Dutch, under the command of Captains Cornelies Reb, Piester Waset and N. van der Reede, captured the fort in March 1658 and subsequently renamed it Hammenhiel (Heel of the Ham), as they considered that shape of Ceylon resembled a smoked ham and the fort was located at the point where the shank bone projects. The Dutch rebuilt the fort in 1680, constructing a stone breakwater, filling in the hollow ramparts, replacing the upper floor with a stone vault and building a brick lined reservoir to the north of the fort. The prison has nine large dungeons to store gunpowder. The Dutch maintained a garrison of about thirty soldiers under the charge of a Lieutenant or Ensign.

The British used the fort firstly as a maximum security prison and then as an infectious diseases hospital. During the Second World War, on orders from Admiral Lord Mountbatten, Camp Hammenhiel was established in late 1944 to start a “Special Operations Group" under the command of Colonel Humphry Tollemache. Mountbatten himself visited the camp in November 1944 with Tollemache.

== Notable inmates ==
In 1971 Rohana Wijeweera, founder leader of the Janatha Vimukthi Peramuna, was detained in the fort after his arrest. It was later used to house other prisoners of the abortive 1971 JVP insurrection. Those detained included Upatissa Gamanayake, Lionel Bopage, Podi Athula (Victor Ivan), Loku Athula (N. Jayasinghe), Jayadeva Uyangoda and Mahinda Wijesekara (who was to later to become a minister).

== Later use ==
Having plenty of space and the proper location to detain prisoners, it was used thereafter by the Sri Lanka Navy to detain sailors accused of wrongdoings. Now it has been transformed into a tourist hotel run by the Sri Lanka Navy.

== See also ==
- Jaffna Fort
- Forts of Sri Lanka
