= Old Nupe Market =

- නූපේ පැරණි වෙළඳ ගොඩනැගිල්ල
- Interactive map of the Old Nupe Market area
- Former names: Old Dutch Market

General information
- Location: Matara, Sri Lanka
- Coordinates: 5°56′51″N 80°32′6″E
- Owner: Archaeological Department (Sri Lanka)

The Old Nupe Market (Sinhala: නූපේ පැරණි වෙළඳ ගොඩනැගිල්ල) or the Old Dutch Market is a historic, European-built structure in Matara, Sri Lanka. It is located about 3.2 kilometres (2.0 mi) from Matara fort, at the junction of the Matara-Akuressa Highway (A24) and Matara Road (B535).

== Building ==
The building was built in the late eighteenth century, probably by the British, but possibly by the Dutch. It was used to house the Nupe market.

The open-sided market building was constructed in a 'T' shape, with the upper bars of the T running parallel with the road and providing the entrance. The pitched roof is tiled in red Sinhala Kandyan period clay tiles (peti-ulu) and supported by large white stone pillars. The supporting wooden frame of the roof is elaborate and edged with lavish latticework. The building is 15 metres (49 ft) high and comprises a 31 metres (102 ft) by 9 metres (30 ft) timber portico in the middle of the building with three small wooden spires above the main roof. One wing would have housed the vegetable market, the other wing meat and fish. The stem of the T was mostly likely to have been used for the sale of textiles and household items.

== See also ==
- List of Dutch colonial buildings in Sri Lanka
