= Hunugalagala Limestone Cave =

Cave and archaeological site in Sri Lanka

- Location within Sri Lanka
- Location: Haldummulla, Badulla, Sri Lanka
- Coordinates: 6°45′55″N 80°53′21″E
- Discovery: 2013 (excavation)

Hunugalagala is a Limestone cave, which is located in Haldummulla, Badulla District of Sri Lanka. It is assumed that this rock formation has been formed millions of years ago. The cave and the surrounding area has been used between 5,000 and 4,000 years ago. Archaeological excavations have been started in July 2013 and revealed grind-stones, painted potsherds, a stone statue of a man's upper body and bones of humans and animals.

Stone utensils or grind-stones revealed that the prehistoric community was used to process food and allow to conclude basic pottery knowledge among the cave inhabitants.
