= Colombo Dutch Museum =

Museum in Colombo, Sri Lanka

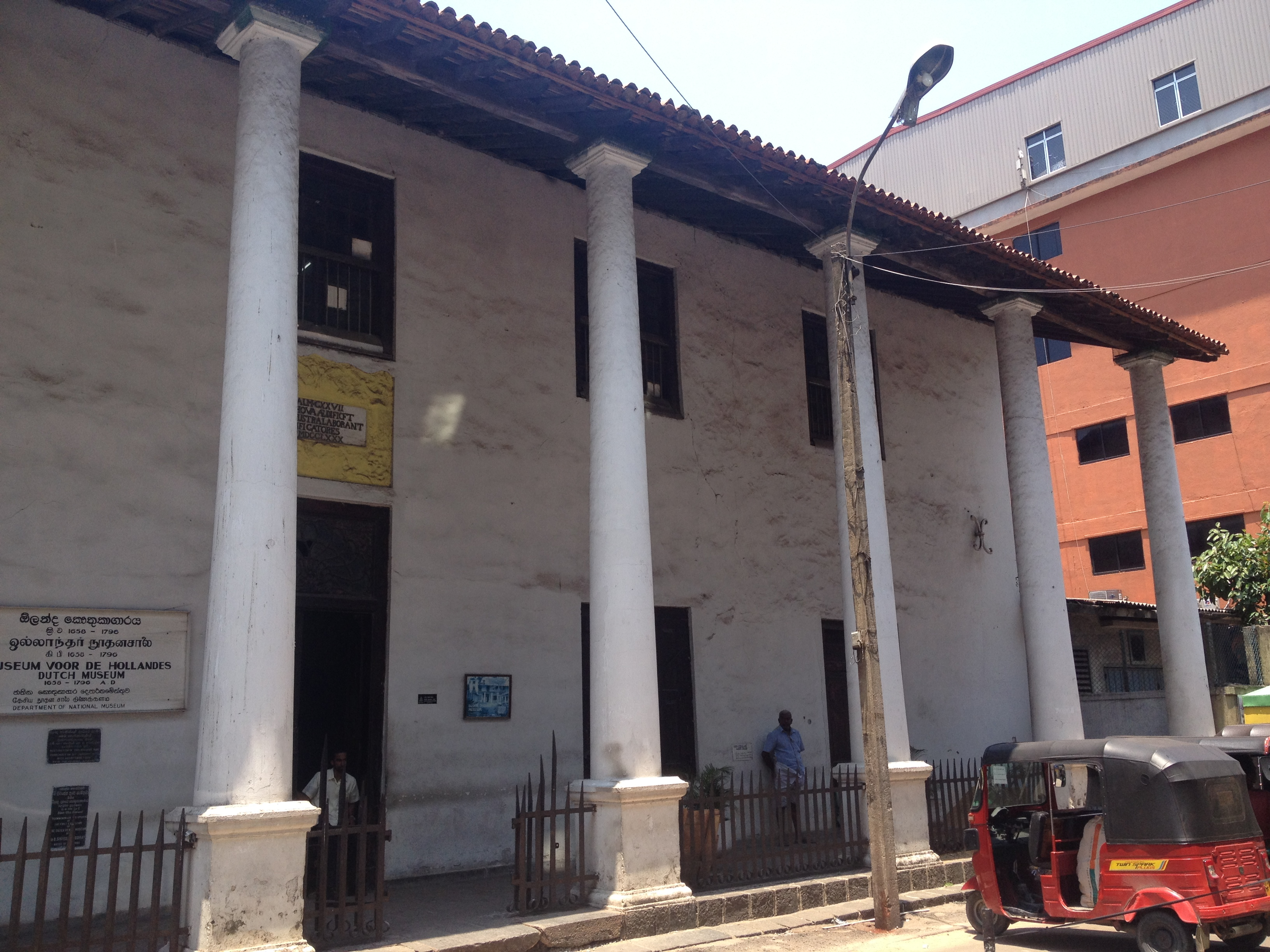
- Established: 1982
- Location: 95 Prince Street, Colombo, Sri Lanka
- Type: History
- Website: Department of National Museums website

The Colombo Dutch Museum is a museum that covers the history of the Dutch colonial rule in Sri Lanka. Housed in a former Dutch colonial building dating to the 17th century. The two-storey structure features a central courtyard and exhibits objects associated with the Dutch colonial period in Sri Lanka, including furniture, coins, ceramics, weapons and documents. It was originally built as the residence of Thomas van Rhee, governor of Dutch Ceylon from 1692 to 1697.

== Design ==
The building has the high roofs and gallery of columns typical of Dutch architecture. Its thick, inward-facing walls keep the noise of Pettah out. From the old hall, visitors look onto the meda midula, regarded as the oldest courtyard garden in Colombo. The courtyard was once a place of relaxation for Dutch officials. It is now a well-kept green space that stands out in the densely built-up Pettah.

== History ==
The two storey colonnaded building on Prince Street, Pettah (Colombo 11) which houses this museum was constructed during the Dutch occupation of Colombo (1656 - 1796) and was the formal residence of the Governor of Dutch Ceylon Thomas van Rhee (1634 - 1701) during his term of office in 1692 to 1697. The building has been used for many different purposes over the years. It was a teacher training college and an institute for the instruction of clergymen between 1696 and 1796. At one time it was the residence of Colonel Count August Carl Fredrick Von Ranzow (1759 - 1844). It operated as an orphanage under the supervision of the deacons and financed by the Dutch East Indies Company. It was also used as a hospital. It became a barracks in the second half of the 1800s and in 1900 it was used as a police training school, set up by the British. In 1932 it was converted to the Pettah Post Office. In 1971 following heavy monsoon rains one of the exterior walls collapsed and the building was abandoned. Following protests by the Royal Asiatic Society and the Dutch Burgher Union against plans to demolish the building, in 1973 a committee was established with representatives from the Ceylon Tourist Board, the Department of Archaeology, the Netherlands Alumni Association of Lanka and the National Archives, to restore the building and establish a museum covering the Dutch colonial period.

The restoration of the building commenced in 1977, with financial assistance of Netherlands government, and was completed in 1981. This museum was opened to the public in 1982. This building embodies the unique architectural features of a colonial Dutch town house. In 1999 the museum building was formally recognised by the Government as an archaeological protected monument in Sri Lanka. The designation was declared on 18 June under the government Gazette number 1085.

The museum while displaying the Dutch legacy with the artefacts including furniture, ceramics, coins and weaponry, portraying the various facets of contemporary life and culture.

== See also ==
- National Maritime Museum, Galle
- Colombo Port Maritime Museum
