= Ratnapura Dutch Fort =

Ratnapura Dutch fort
- Ratnapura, Sri Lanka
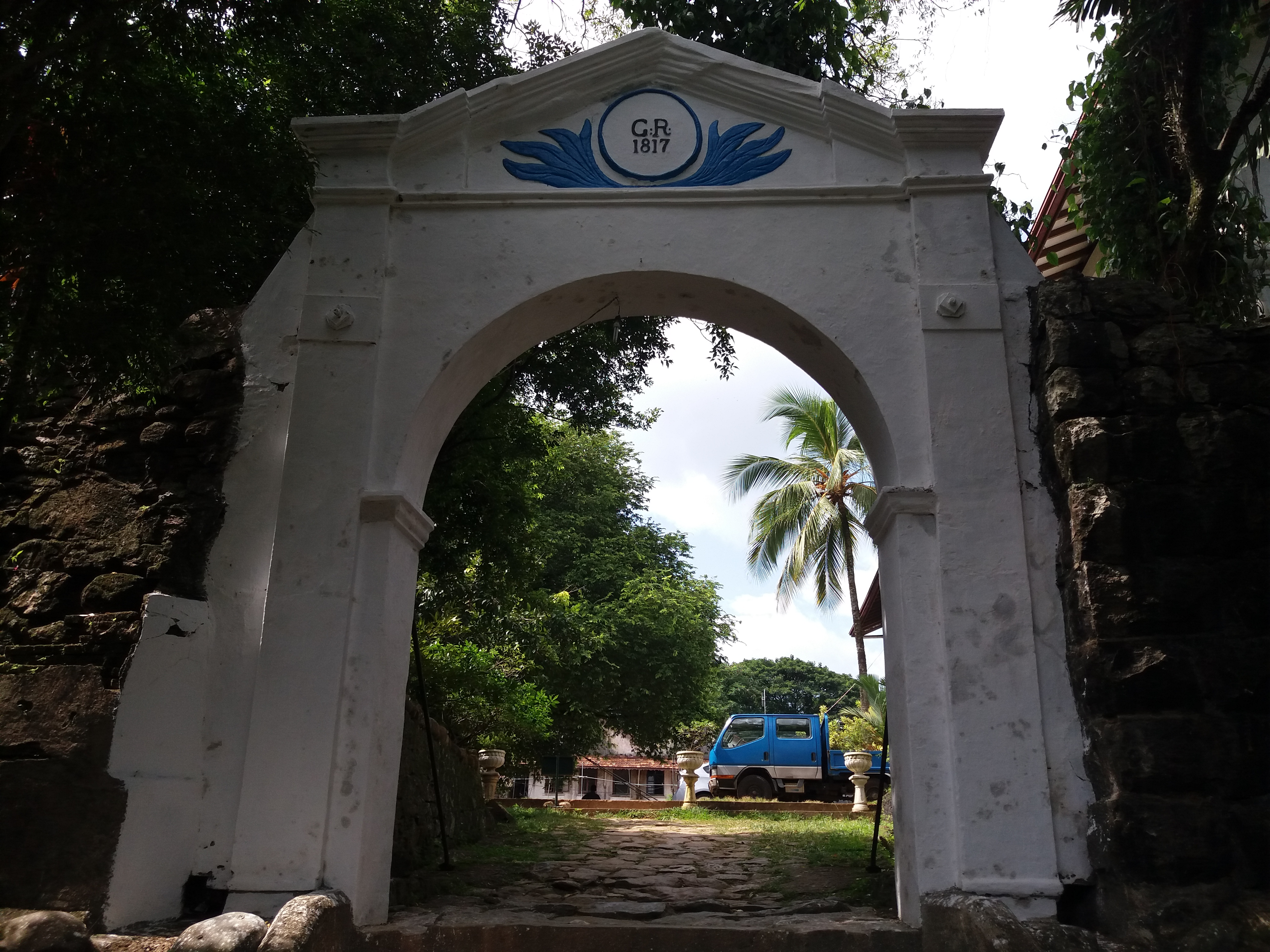
- Entrance arch of the fort premises

Site information
- Type: Defence fort

Location
- Sri Lanka
- Location within Sri Lanka
- Coordinates: 6.679548°N 80.402549°E

Site history
- Built by: Dutch

Ratnapura Dutch fort, (Sinhala: රත්නපුර ලන්දේසි බලකොටුව Rathnapura Landesi Balakotuwa), was built by the Dutch in Ratnapura, Sri Lanka.

The Portuguese had originally constructed a fort at Ratnapura in 1620 however was later captured and destroyed by Kirti Sri Raja Singha (the second Nayaka king of Kandy). By 1658 the Dutch had taken control over all the areas previously controlled by the Portuguese. The Dutch initially used the site of the Portuguese fort but subsequently built a new fort on a hill in the middle of the town.

The design of the fort is similar to the fort at Kalutara, in that it had two bastions. The fort was large enough to accommodate the governor's office and residence, court building, hospital, chapel and barracks for 40 men. It was captured by the British in 1817.

It was declared as an archaeological monument in 2002 and 2005. It was however partially demolished by the local government, who constructed a number of buildings on the site. The fort is currently being used as the offices for the National Gem and Jewellery Authority, together with a number of private offices.

The site of the fort is now where the Police Station (established 1 January 1864), Public Library and the former Kachcheri (established 1817) are now situated.

== See also ==
- Ratnapura Portuguese fort
