= National Building Research Organisation =

Agency overview
- Formed: 1984
- Jurisdiction: Government of Sri Lanka
- Headquarters: 99/1 Jawatta Road Colombo 05, Sri Lanka
- Parent department: Ministry of Disaster Management
- Website: www.nbro.gov.lk

The National Building Research Organisation (NBRO) is a Sri Lankan government research and development institute established in 1984. The organisation is responsible for various programmes to assist a disaster-free built environment in the future.
