= Ratnapura Portuguese fort =

- Ratnapura, Sri Lanka

Site information
- Type: Defence fort
- Condition: Destroyed

Location
- Sri Lanka
- Coordinates: 6.690866°N 80.379547°E

Site history
- Built: 1618–1620
- Built by: Portuguese

Ratnapura Portuguese fort (Sinhala: රත්නපුර පෘතුගීසි බලකොටුව Rathnapura Pruthugisi Balakotuwa; Tamil: இரத்தினபுரி போர்த்துக்கேயக் கோட்டை, romanized: Irattiṉapuri Pōrttukkēyak Kōṭṭai) was built by the Portuguese in Ratnapura, Sri Lanka.

The Portuguese constructed the fort and a church, between 1618 and 1620, on the ground of Saman Devalaya (an ancient devale or Hindu shrine) following the defeat of the King of Sitawaka, Rajasinha I. The town and the fort was later captured by Kirti Sri Raja Singha (the second Nayaka king of Kandy, who destroyed the church and the fort and constructed a Buddhist temple, Maha Saman Devalaya, on the site. In the temple grounds there is a stone sculpture, which depicts the Portuguese General Simao Pinnao, on horseback brandishing a sword, whilst trampling a Sinhalese soldier.

== See also ==
- Ratnapura Dutch fort
