= Hoods Tower Museum =

Naval museum of the Sri Lanka Navy in Trincomalee

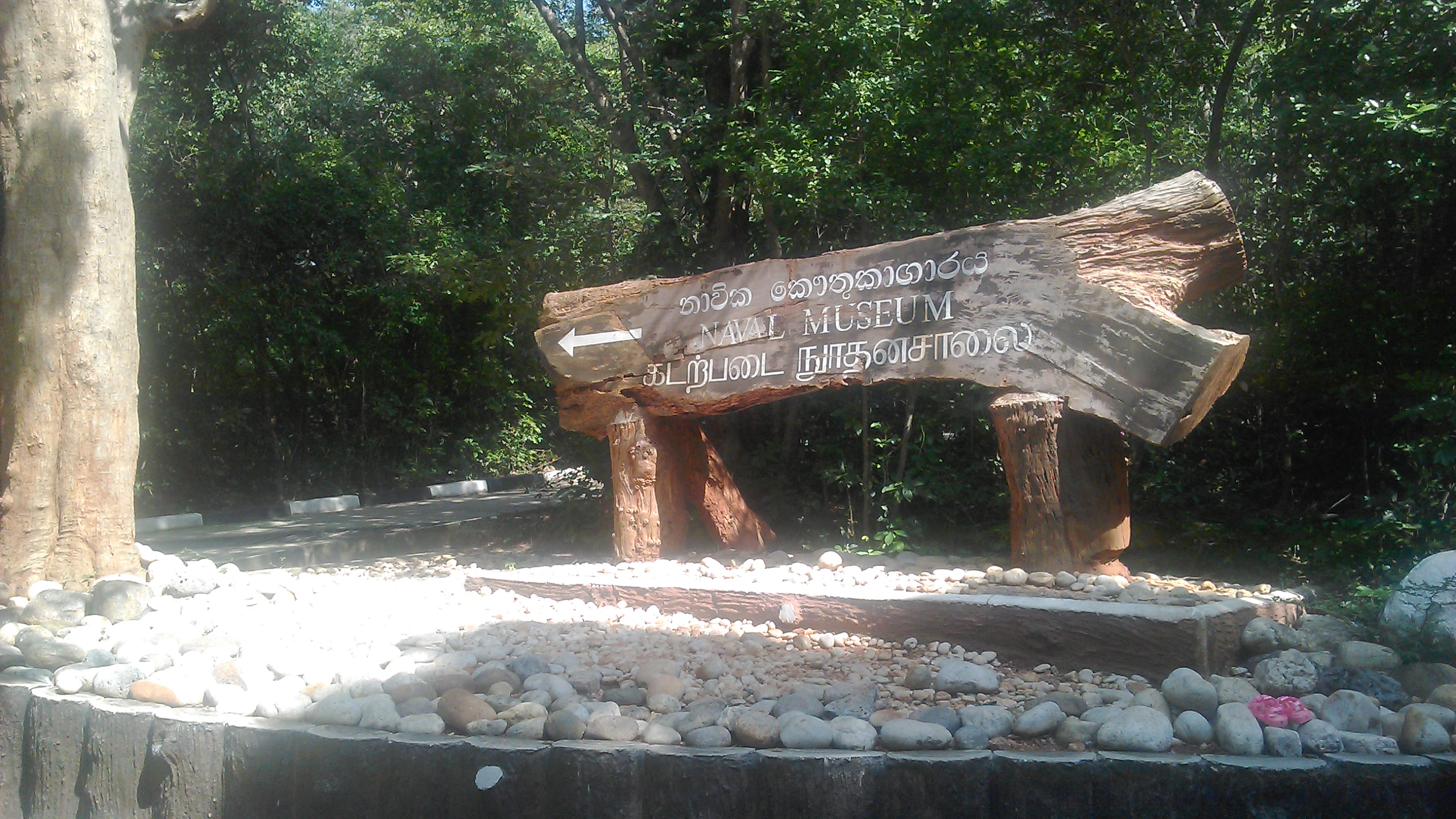
- Nameboard of the Hoods Tower Museum
- Location: Trincomalee, Sri Lanka
- Type: Military

The Hoods Tower Museum (Tamil: குட் கோபுர நூதனசாலை, romanized: Kuṭ Kōpura Nūtaṉacālai; Sinhala: ත්‍රිකුණාමලය නාවික කෞතුකාගාරය Trikuṇāmalaya Nāvika Kautukāgāraya) is a naval museum of the Sri Lanka Navy in Trincomalee. It is located at Ostenburg, in the Trincomalee peninsula on a high ridge overlooking the entrance to the inner harbor of Trincomalee within the SLN Dockyard. The museum gains its name from the Hoods Tower, an observation tower named after Vice-Admiral Sir Samuel Hood, Commander of the East Indies Station.

== Fort Ostenburg ==
The location derives its name from the Fort Ostenburg, a small fort built at the entrance to the inner harbour of Trincomalee by the Dutch and later surrendered to the British 1795. It has been called "the most powerfully gunned fort in Ceylon" with strong batteries at sea level and many guns on the ridge above them. However little of it remains today, mainly due to the constriction of coastal artillery placements by the British since the 1920 in the Ostenburg ridge.

== Coastal artillery ==
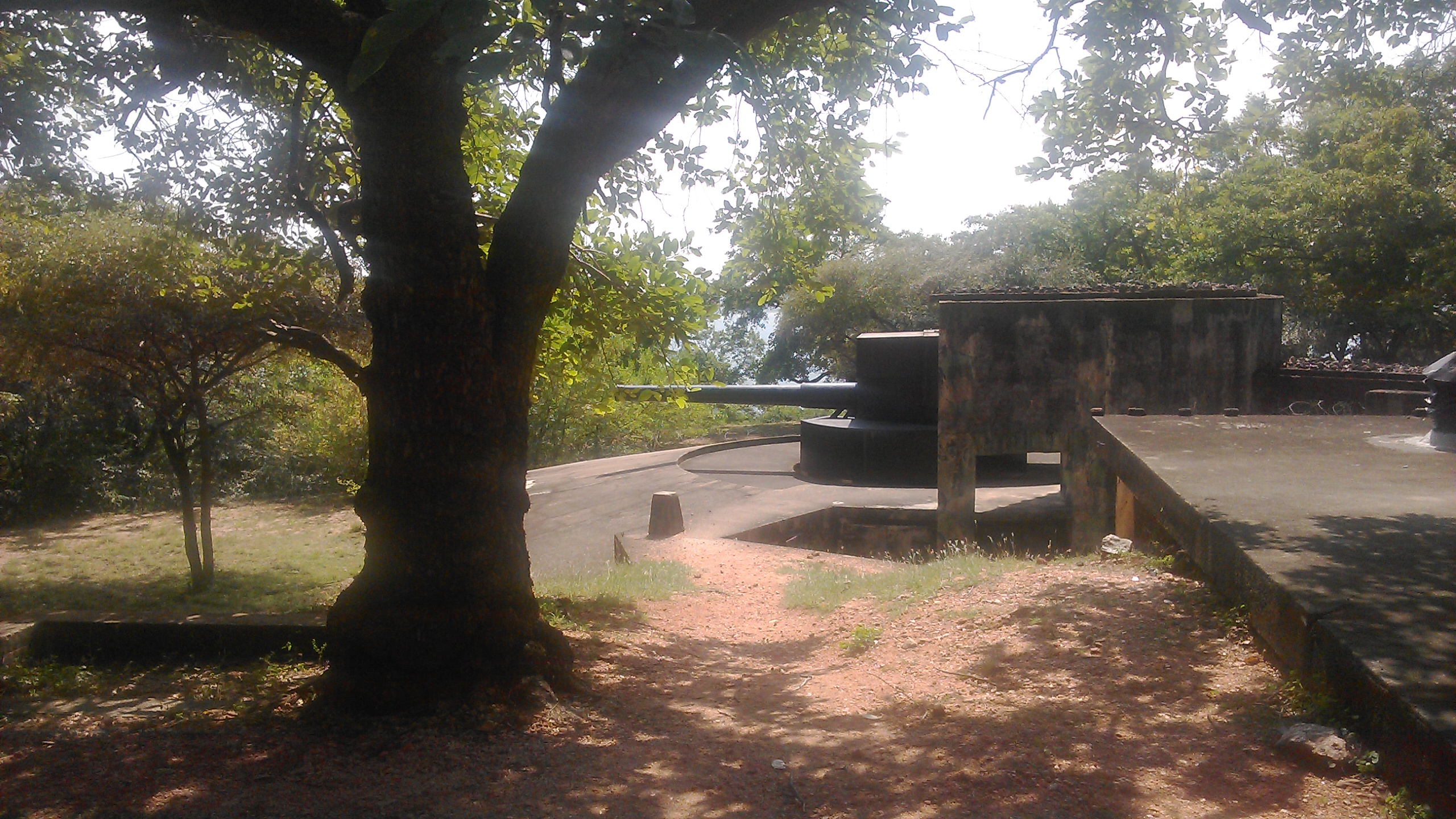
A coastal artillery emplacement at Hoods Tower Museum

In 1920, the British began deploying coastal artillery on the Ostenburg ridge to protect the entrance to the Trincomalee harbor which had become a major Royal Navy base in the Far East. Mounted on the ridge was a battery of three BL 6 inch Mk VII naval guns within casemates and with individual underground ammunition stores. Two BL 9.2 inch Mk IX guns were also added. Fire control tower was constructed which commands a 360 degree view of the area and was used for directing artillery along with concrete quarters that were built for the gun crews. With the outbreak of World War II, the coastal batteries in Trincomalee manned by the 6th Coast Regiment, Royal Artillery and the 2nd Heavy Anti-Aircraft Regiment, Ceylon Garrison Artillery was deployed for its protection. With the departure of the Royal Navy from Trincomalee in 1956, the operation of the guns were taken over by the 2nd (Volunteer) Coastal Artillery / Anti-Aircraft Regiment, Ceylon Artillery. The coastal artillery batteries were decommissioned in 1962.

== Museum ==
Some of the guns are maintained in functional level for symbolic reasons by the Sri Lanka Navy. In the 1990s the navy developed the location into a naval museum with many artifacts. Much of the museum itself is housed in ground level and underground casements built during World War II. House here is a collection of weapons, equipment and weapon systems used by the navy. Prizes of war on display include captured Sea Tiger attack crafts, suicide crafts and LTTE weapons, including an all-terrain vehicle that was used by Charles Anthony.

== See also ==
- Forts of Sri Lanka
