= Arandora fort =

- Kegalle, Sri Lanka

Site information
- Type: Defence fort
- Condition: Destroyed

Location
- Coordinates: 7.1937°N 80.3006°E

Site history
- Built by: Portuguese & Dutch
- Battles/wars: Several

Arandora Fort (Sinhala: අරන්දොර බලකොටුව, romanized: Arandora Balakotuwa) was built by the Portuguese in Narangoda, Kegalle, and was captured by Dutch in 1665.

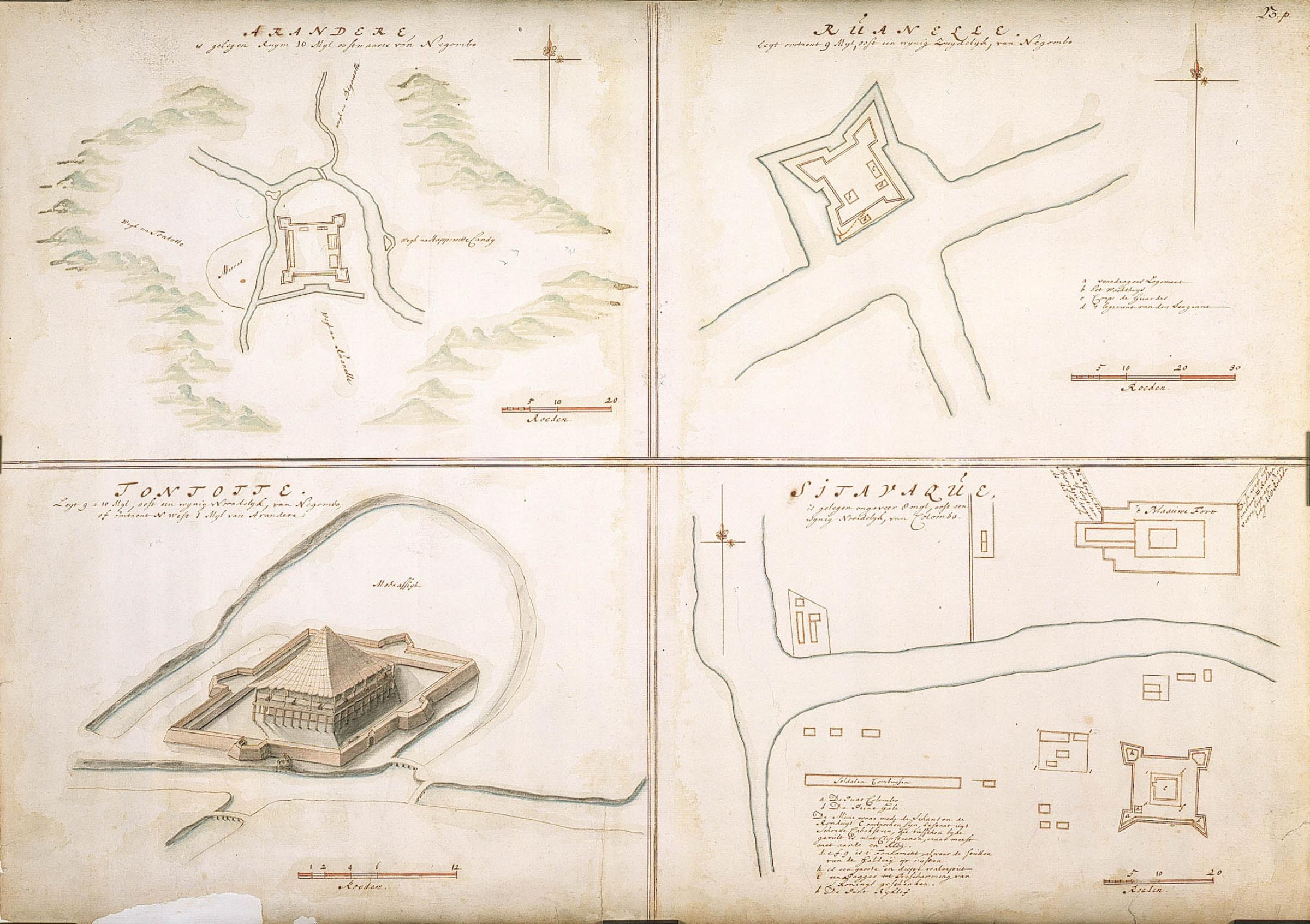
1690 Map of Arandora fort (top left corner)

This map shows Arandara, Tunthota, Manikkadawara and Seethawaka forts, all the forts were located in close proximity, within 5 km (3.1 mi) of each other. There are some ruins still visible of Manikkadawara fort.

The fort served as a base camp for the Portuguese and it served as a fortification for the Dutch, especially against the forces of the Kandyan king Rajasinghe II. In October 1670 the Kandyan forces attacked and captured the fort taking the Dutch garrison, who were stationed there at the time of the battle, prisoners. In order to facilitate the release of the prisoners the Dutch closed the ports at Batticaloa, Kottiar and Kalpitiya.

There are no visible remains of the fort.
