= Ruwanwella Fort =

Fort in Kegalle, Sri Lanka

Ruwanwella fort
- Kegalle, Sri Lanka

Site information
- Type: Defence fort
- Controlled by: Government of Sri Lanka
- Condition: good

Location
- Sri Lanka
- Location within Sri Lanka
- Coordinates: 7.045984°N 80.254049°E

Site history
- Built: 1817
- Built by: British

Ruwanwella fort (Sinhala: රුවන්වැල්ල බලකොටුව Ruwanwælla Balakotuwa; Tamil: உருவான்வெல்லைக் கோட்டை, romanized: Uruvāṉvellaik Kōṭṭai), was initially a fortified base camp erected by the Portuguese in 1590s at Ruwanwella, Kegalle, Sri Lanka. It was captured by Dutch in 1665, who constructed a wooden fort (Ruanelle) but abandoned it within a few years. In 1817 the British built a stone fort on the site with two bastions.

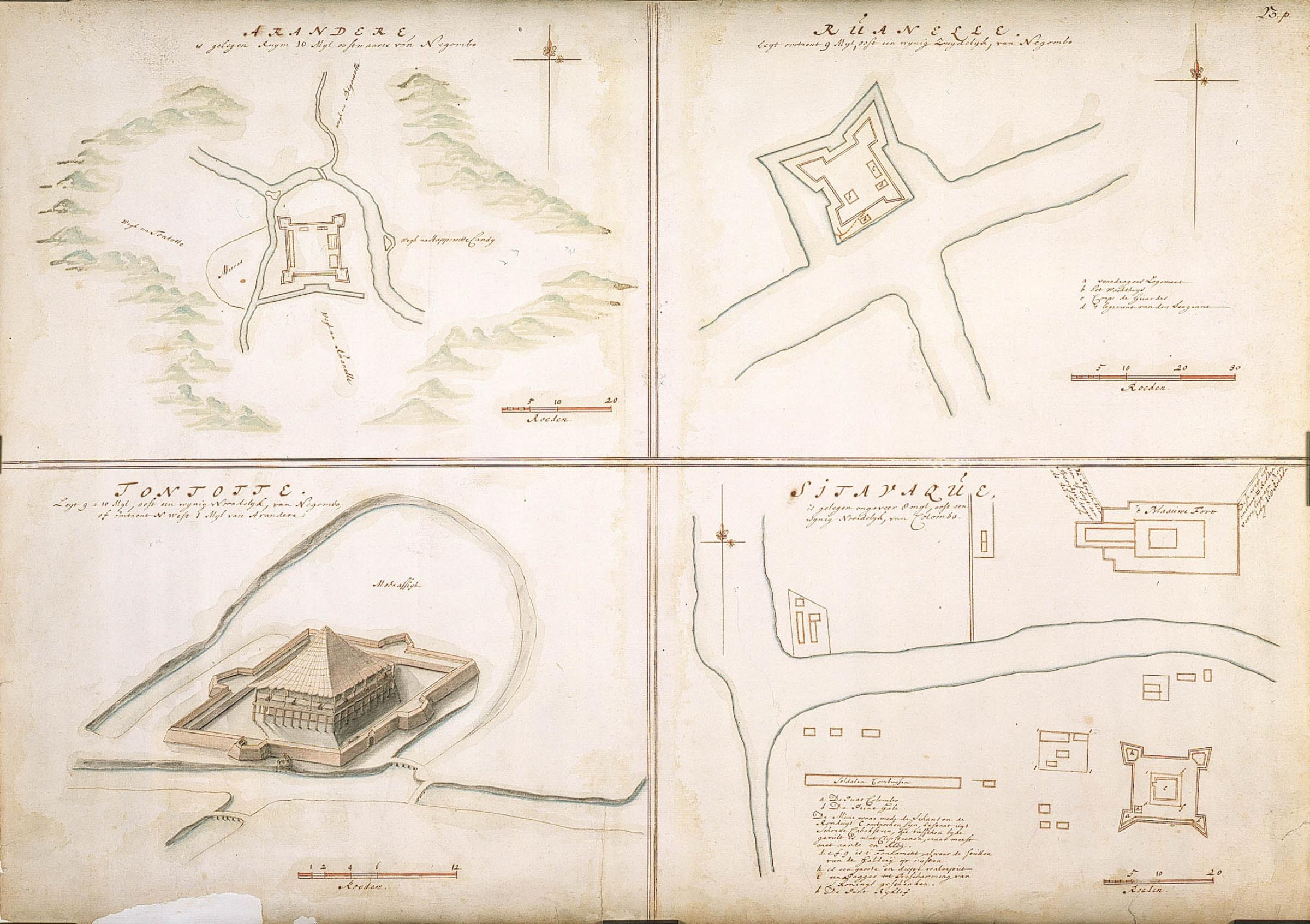
1690 Map of Fort Ruanelle (top right corner)

Ruwanwella fort is currently being used as a police station.
