= Tangalle Fort =

- Part of Hambantota District
- Tangalle, Sri Lanka

Site information
- Type: Defence fort
- Controlled by: Government of Sri Lanka
- Open to the public: no
- Condition: good

Location
- Sri Lanka
- Location within Sri Lanka
- Coordinates: 6°1′21″N 80°47′53″E
- Height: 12 m (39 ft)

Site history
- Built by: Dutch
- Materials: limestone and coral

Tangalle Fort (Sinhala: තංගල්ල බලකොටුව, romanized: Tangalla Balakotuwa; Tamil: தங்காலைக் கோட்டை, romanized: Taṅkālaik Kōṭṭai) is a small Dutch fort located in the coastal town of Tangalle, Sri Lanka. The Dutch used Tangalle as an important anchorage on the southern coast of the island.

Tangalle fort differs from most other forts constructed by the Dutch, in that the fort has no massive ramparts. The four main walls, which are 12 m (39 ft) high, enclose a space similar to a rhombus, in height, in opposite corners of the structure. The fort was significantly altered by the British in the middle of the 19th century when it was converted into a prison. The British also used Tangalle as an anchorage. The fort is still being used as a prison by the Department of Prisons.

== See also ==
- Forts of Sri Lanka
