= Menikkadawara Fort =

- Kegalle, Sri Lanka

Site information
- Type: Defence fort
- Condition: Few remains beneath the sand

Location
- Sri Lanka
- Coordinates: 7.187990°N 80.251145°E

Site history
- Built: 1599
- Built by: Portuguese

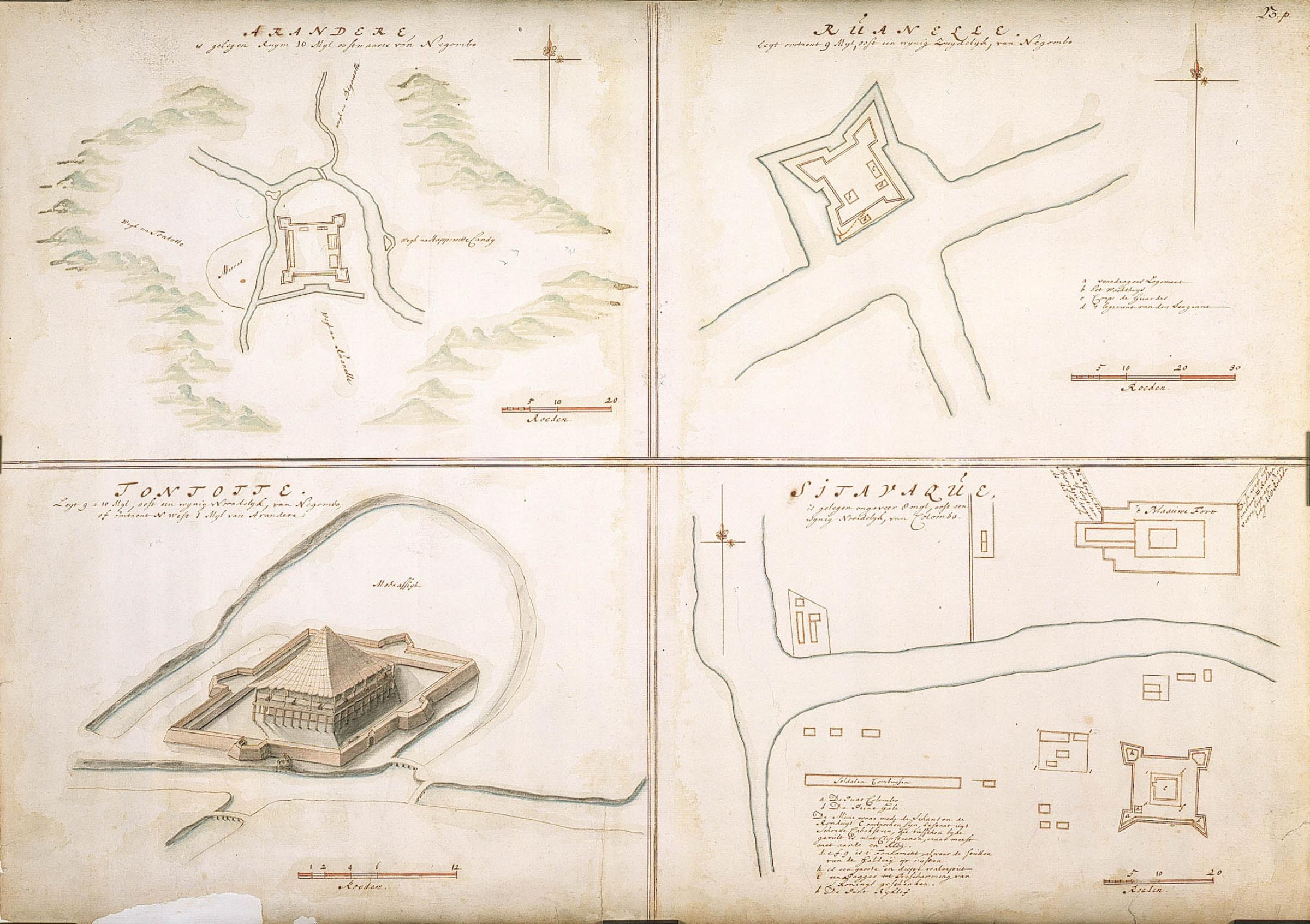
Map of Menikkadawara Fort (bottom left corner), named as "Tontotte fort"

Menikkadawara Fort (Sinhala: මැනික්කඩවර බලකොටුව Mænikkadawara Balakotuwa;Tamil: மெனிக்கடவரைக் கோட்டை, romanized: Meṉikkaṭavaraik Kōṭṭai), was a small fort located at Menikkadawara, Kegalle. The Portuguese called the place, Manicravaré or Manicavarê.

In January 1599 the Portuguese erected a tranqueira (a wooden stockade) on the site. In 1603 the Portuguese were forced to withdraw from the area by the Kandyan forces. In 1626, under the supervision of the Portuguese Governor, Constantino de Sá de Noronha, the fort was upgraded and strengthened, the rectangular fortification was known as the Forte Santa Fe or the Cidadela (Citadel) of Forte Cruz, it had four bastions on each corner, named Saõ Iago, Saõ Boa Ventura, Saõ Jorge and Saõ Pedro. The fort was not a major structure, and its status as a fort was questionable since it was mainly earth ramparts. It, however, played a strategically-important role against the Kandyan kingdom, as the main marshalling point for Portuguese forces in their ongoing fight against the Kingdom of Kandy. It was recorded that approximately 400 Portuguese soldiers were garrisoned in the area. In the 1630s the fort fell to Kandyan forces, as the result of ongoining rebellion against the Portuguese invasion of the Kingdom of Kandy. The Portuguese however re-captured it. Following the defeat of the Portuguese in 1658, the area was re-occupied by the forces of the Kingdom of Kandy. The Menikkadawara fort lost its strategic role, once the Dutch secured control of Ceylon.

Today, the only remains of the fort that are visible are the earthen ramparts, which are overgrown with grass and weeds.
