= Batticaloa Gate =

- மட்டக்களப்பு வாயில்
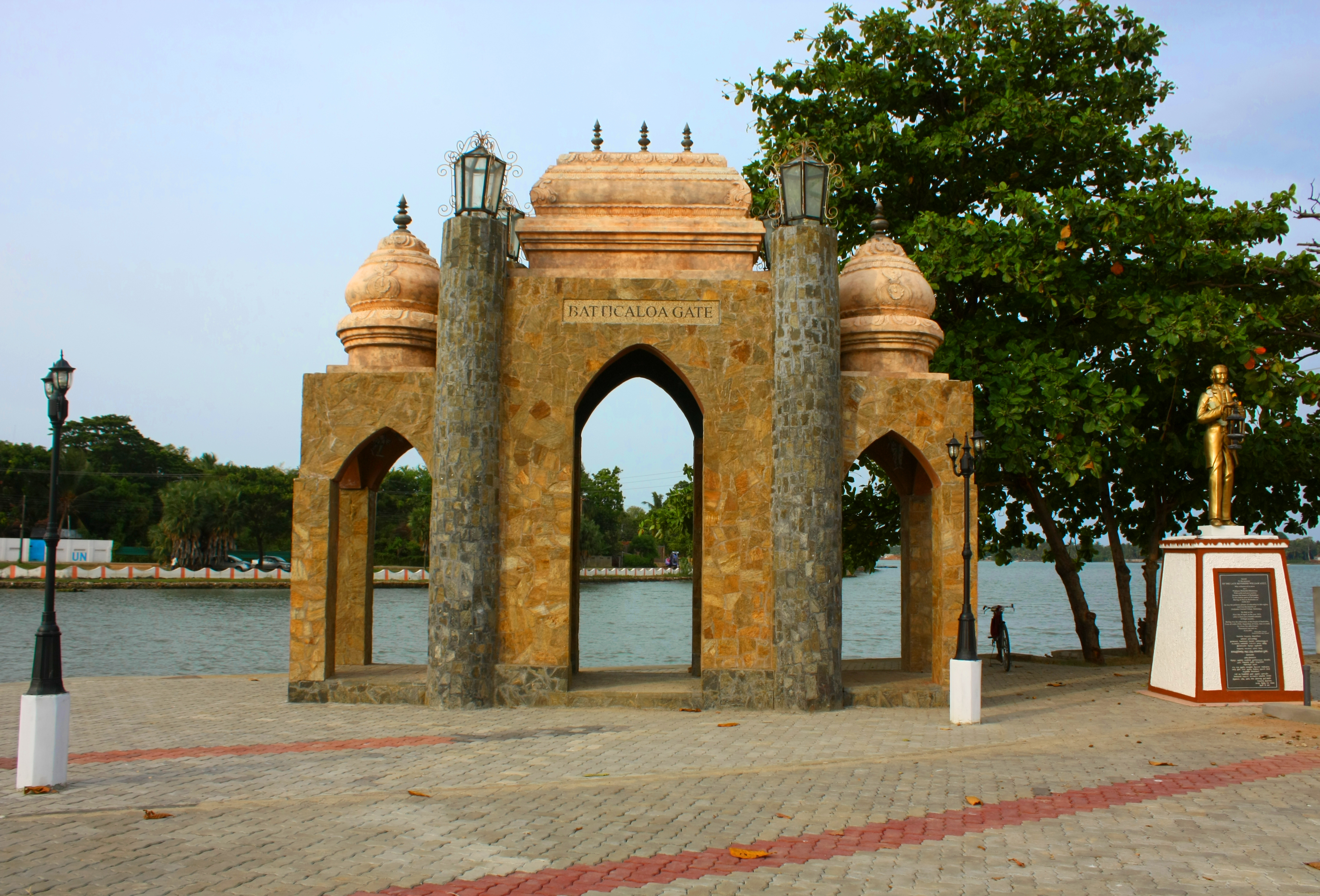
- Interactive map of Batticaloa Gate
- Location: Batticaloa, Sri Lanka
- Coordinates: 7°42′48″N 81°41′59″E
- Type: Memorial
- Material: Concrete and granite

Batticaloa Gate is a monument, which was used as a port to connect Puliyanthivu (island) with the mainland of Batticaloa, Sri Lanka. The place is believed as the landing site of Rev. William Ault, who was the first Methodist missionary to Batticaloa, in 1814. His statue is located close to Batticaloa Gate.

Batticaloa Gate and its surrounding area are under renovation as part of Batticaloa development project.
