= Fort Beschutter =

- Elephant Pass, Sri Lanka

Site information
- Type: Defence fort
- Condition: Destroyed

Location
- Coordinates: 9.560736°N 80.416422°E

Site history
- Built by: Dutch
- Materials: Granite Stones
- Battles/wars: Many

Fort Beschutter (Sinhala: බෙෂ්ෂටර් බලකොටුව Beshshatar Balakotuwa) or Fort Pass Beschutter (Tamil: பெசுச்சூட்டர் கடவைக் கோட்டை, romanized: Pecuccūṭṭar Kaṭavaik Kōṭṭai; Sinhala: බෙෂ්ෂටර් පාස් බලකොටුව Beshshatar Pas Balakotuwa) was a small fort, which was linearly located between Elephant Pass Fort and Fort Pass Pyl in the narrow part of the Jaffna Peninsula. The strategic fort was used to protect Jaffna Peninsula from the forces of mainland (Vanniyas and Sinhalese) as well as illegal access, smuggling, etc.

Fort Beschutter was built as square-shaped fort like other two in the Elephant Pass area. It was destroyed and nothing found today.
