= Elephant Pass fort =

Defunct Dutch military fort in Sri Lanka

Elephant Pass Fort
- Elephant Pass, Sri Lanka

Site information
- Type: Defence fort
- Condition: Destroyed

Location
- Location within Northern Province
- Coordinates: 9.523343°N 80.408080°E

Site history
- Built: 1776
- Built by: Dutch
- Materials: Granite Stones
- Battles/wars: Many

Elephant Pass Fort (Tamil: ஆனையிறவுக் கோட்டை, romanized: Āṉaiyiṟavuk Kōṭṭai; Sinhala: අලිමංකඩ බලකොටුව Alimankada Balakotuwa) was a small fort in the strategically important spot as it linked Jaffna Peninsula to the mainland. It was built by the Dutch in 1776 on the banks of the Jaffna lagoon.

The fort was served as a defensive structure to protect the Jaffna Peninsula. It was like a well-fortified stockade or a watch post. It had two bastions, and each bastion was equipped with four cannons. Elephant Pass Fort was linearly located with Fort Beschutter and Fort Pass Pyl in the narrow part of the peninsula. During the British rule, the fort was used as a rest house. It was destroyed during the Sri Lankan civil war.
