= Fort Pyl =

- Elephant Pass, Sri Lanka

Site information
- Type: Defence fort
- Condition: Destroyed

Location
- Coordinates: 9.589170°N 80.444578°E

Site history
- Built by: Dutch
- Materials: Granite Stones
- Battles/wars: Many

Fort Pyl (Sinhala: පෙයිල් බලකොටුව Peyil Balakotuwa) or Fort Pass Pyl (Tamil: பைல் கடவைக் கோட்டை, romanized: Pail Kaṭavaik Kōṭṭai; Sinhala: පෙයිල් පාස් බලකොටුව Peyil Pas Balakotuwa) was a small fort in the Elephant Pass Fort areas, which is narrow part of the Jaffna Peninsula. The fort was located in line with two other forts, Elephant Pass fort and Fort Beschutter, in order to protect Jaffna Peninsula from attacks originating from the mainland.

The square-shaped fort built as similar to Elephant Pass fort and Fort Beschutter. It was destroyed and no evidence of the fort is visible today.
