= Koddiyar fort =

- Part of Trincomalee
- Muttur, Sri Lanka

Site information
- Type: Defence fort
- Condition: Destroyed

Location
- Sri Lanka
- Coordinates: 8.462363°N 81.260955°E

Site history
- Built: 1622; 404 years ago
- Built by: Dutch
- Battles/wars: Several

Koddiyar fort (Tamil: கொட்டியாரக் கோட்டை, romanized: Koṭṭiyārak Kōṭṭai; Sinhala: කොඩ්ඩියාර් බලකොටුව Koddiyar Balakotuwa) was the first fort that was built by Dutch in Ceylon. It was constructed in 1622 and is located on the southern side of Koddiyar Bay (Koddiyar means 'fort by the river'). Other names for it include Kinnia, Muttur, and Sampoor.

Kandyan king Senarat granted permission to build a fort in Koddiyar (now known as Muttur) due a treaty between the king and the Dutch. The treaty had a purpose of get rid of the Portuguese from the country. However, Portuguese destroyed the partly built fort since they had control in Trincomalee area including Koddiyar. Later, the Dutch defeated the Portuguese in the island, and Koddiyar fort was rebuilt and strengthened in 1658.
