= Kayts =

Kayts ஊர்காவற்துறை කයිට්ස්
- Village
- Location within Northern Province Location within Sri Lanka
- Coordinates: 9°40′0″N 79°52′0″E
- Country: Sri Lanka
- Province: Northern
- District: Jaffna
- DS Division: Islands North

Kayts (Tamil: ஊர்காவற்துறை, romanized: Ūrkāvaṟtuṟai, Sinhala: කයිට්ස්, romanized: kayiṭs), is a village on Velanai Island, off the Jaffna Peninsula in northern Sri Lanka. There are a number of other villages on the island such as Allaippiddi, Mankumpan, Velanai, Saravanai, Puliyankoodal, Suruvil, Naranthanai, Karampon and Melinchimunai.

== Etymology ==
The name Kayts is of colonial origin, derived from the Portuguese "Caes dos Elefantes" meaning "Elephants' Quay", often just shortened to Cais. It was named such because elephants were shipped from here to India. The present term evolved further as Kayts under Dutch rule.

The native Tamil name Ūrkavathurai means "port which guards the country". This name is again derived from the original Tamil term Ūrathurai, derived from the Tamil words Uru meaning "ship" or "schooner", and thurai meaning "port". The earliest reference to this is found in two Tamil inscriptions of the 12th century AD, one found in Thiruvalangadu, Tamil Nadu issued by Rajadhiraja Chola II and one found in Nainativu issued by Parakramabahu I.

Other scholars derive the name from the Pali name Ūrātota meaning "Pig port", referring to a legend surrounding the Śakra Buddhist deity, who swam from India to this place in the form of a pig. Earliest reference to this is found in the Pali chronicle Pujavaliya of the 13th century AD.

== History ==
The earliest inscription mentioning Kayts or Ūrathurai is that of a Tamil Chola inscription of the 12th century AD discovered in Fort Hammenhiel, referring to the 9th century AD Chola general of the King Parantaka Chola II, who was defeated in a battlefield in Kayts. The 13th century AD Pali chronicle Pujavaliya, mentions that Mahinda IV defeated a Tamil general who landed at Hurātota from the Cola country. A Tamil 12th century AD inscription issued by Rajadhiraja Chola II found in Thiruvalangadu, Tamil Nadu also mentions the Chola King taking elephants from Kayts and other places such as Valikamam and Mattivazh.

Archeological remains found in Kayts indicates it was a harbour for foreign vessels. The Tamil 12th century AD inscription of Nainativu issued by Parakramabahu I mentions Kayts as a port where foreigners must first land for trading.

Kayts was part of the Jaffna Kingdom. Under the chieftainship of Migapulle Arachchi, a group of Christians revolted against the Jaffna King Cankili II, after which they sought refuge in Kayts and asked the Portuguese for assistance.

== Geography ==
Kayts is located on Velanai Island, which is connected to the Jaffna Peninsula by the Pamban–Velanai causeway system. Kayts has long functioned as a coastal settlement with maritime links to the surrounding islands, reflecting its long-standing role as a port and point of entry in northern Sri Lanka.

== Modern Period ==
Kayts, along with other settlements in the Jaffna Peninsula, was affected by the Sri Lankan Civil War (1983-2009). Access to the area was restricted access, residents were displaced, and fishing and trade were disrupted. Following the end of the civil war, the region experienced gradual resettlement and the restoration of transport links and local economic activity.

== Education ==
Karampon Shanmuganathan Maha Vidyalayam is a major government secondary school serving the Kayts area. The school provides primary and secondary education to students from Kayts and surrounding villages and has historically functioned as one of the principal educational institutions on the island.

== Religion ==
Kayts is home to a number of Hindu and Christian places of worship, reflecting the island’s religious diversity. Hindu religious life on the island centres around Saiva temples, including the Karampon Shanmuganathar Temple and the Kanapatheeswaram Sivan Temple, which serve the surrounding villages. Kayts also has historic Christian churches, notably St. James’ Church, associated with the Portuguese and Dutch colonial periods, was first built in 1716, and was replaced by the current building in 1815.
