= Point Pedro Fort =

17th-century fort in Port Pedro, Sri Lanka

Point Pedro fort
- Part of Jaffna
- Jaffna, Sri Lanka

Site information
- Type: Defense fort
- Condition: Destroyed

Site history
- Built: 1665
- Built by: Dutch
- Materials: limestone and coral
- Battles/wars: Several

Point Pedro fort (Tamil: பருத்தித்துறைக் கோட்டை, romanized: Paruttittuṟaik Kōṭṭai; Sinhala: පේදුරුතුඩුව බලකොටුව Peduruthuduwa Balakotuwa) is a fort built in 1665 by the Dutch in Point Pedro, Sri Lanka. It was constructed during the Second Anglo-Dutch War, by the Dutch East India Company to counter a possible British attack from the Bay of Bengal.

On the 27 August 1795, the fort was captured by British forces, the 61st Pioneers (also known as 1st Battalion Sepoys).

It is reported that the basement was triangular in shape, which led to it being built as a nearly triangle-shaped fort. It had only one bastion towards the landward side and it was lacking space inside the fort due to its structure. The seaside structure of the fort was just a wall with no bastions or cannons. Further details of the fort have been identified from Dutch era maps. According to the maps, one side wall was 80 m (260 ft) long and the other two walls were 42 m (138 ft) in length.
