= Katuwana fort =

Katuwana Fort
- Part of Hambantota District
- Katuwana, Sri Lanka

Site information
- Type: Defence fort
- Open to the public: yes
- Condition: good

Location
- Sri Lanka
- Coordinates: 6°16′3″N 80°41′42″E
- Height: 5 m (16 ft)

Site history
- Built: 1646
- Built by: Dutch

Katuwana Fort (Sinhala: කටුවන බලකොටුව Katuwana Balakotuwa; Tamil: கட்டுவனைக் கோட்டை, romanized: Kaṭṭuvaṉaik Kōṭṭai; also known as Fort Catuna or Fort Catoene), is an inland fort constructed by the Dutch in 1646.

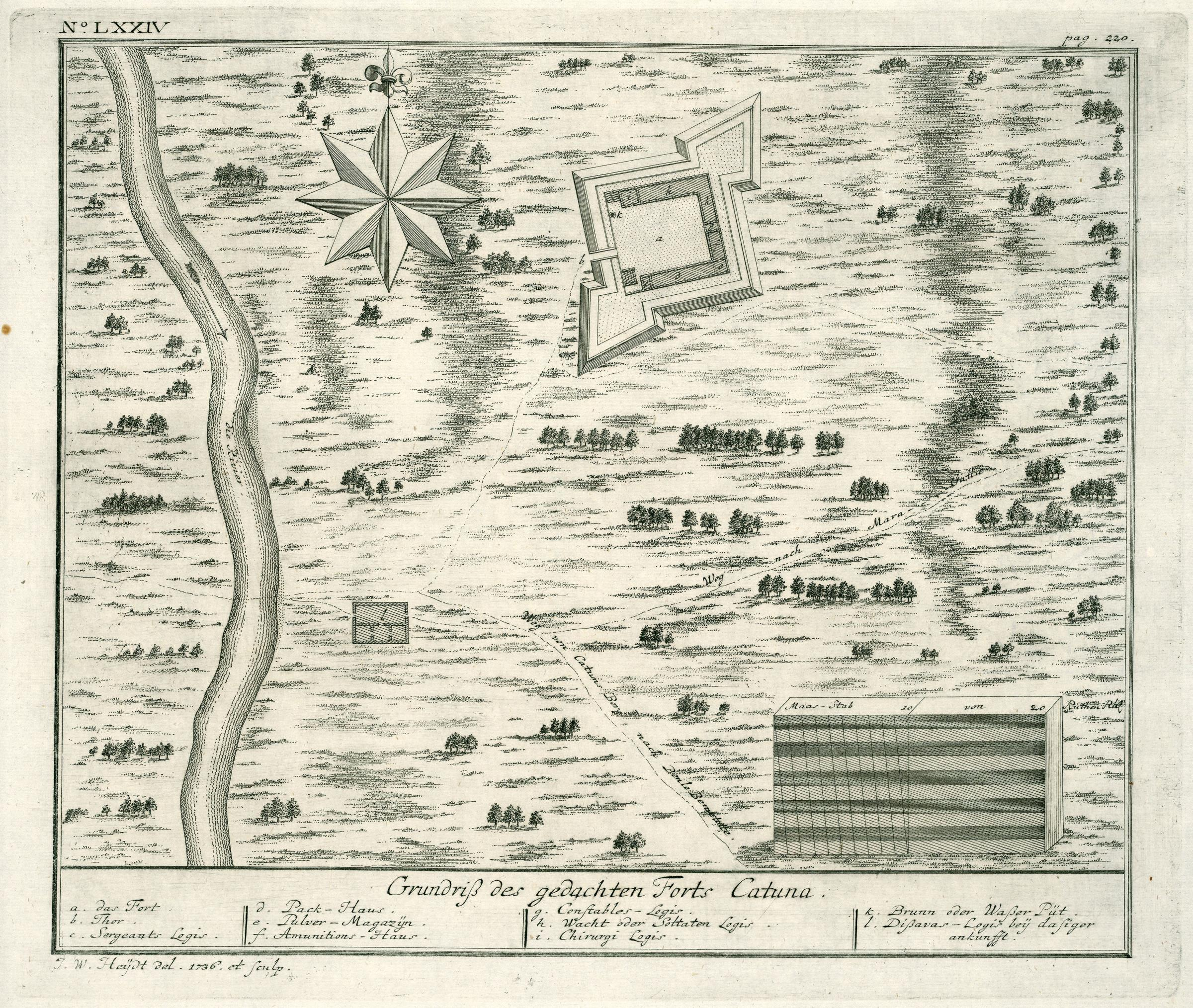
1736 Map of Fort Catuna

The Dutch generally built forts along the coastal areas to protect strategic harbours and anchorages from other colonial forces, such as the Portuguese. They did however construct some forts inland, primarily to defend the coastal lowland areas from attacks by the Kingdom of Kandy. Katuwana fort was built approximately 40 km (25 mi) from Matara, in the Kandyan foothills at the northern limits of the Dutch East India Company's territory.

The fort was located on the slope of a hill, with 5 m (16 ft) high ramparts, a single gateway and a 4 m (13 ft) walkway on top. It was diagonal in shape, with two bastions, which each accommodated six cannon, as a result it was often described as a redoubt rather than a fort.

In 1761 during the 'Matara Rebellion' the fort was captured by Kirti Sri Rajasinha's Kandyan forces and partly destroyed. Following the anexure of the Kandy Kingdom by the British in 1815 the fort lost its strategic value and was abandoned.
