= National Maritime Museum (Galle) =

Museum in Sri Lanka

National Maritime Archaeology Museum
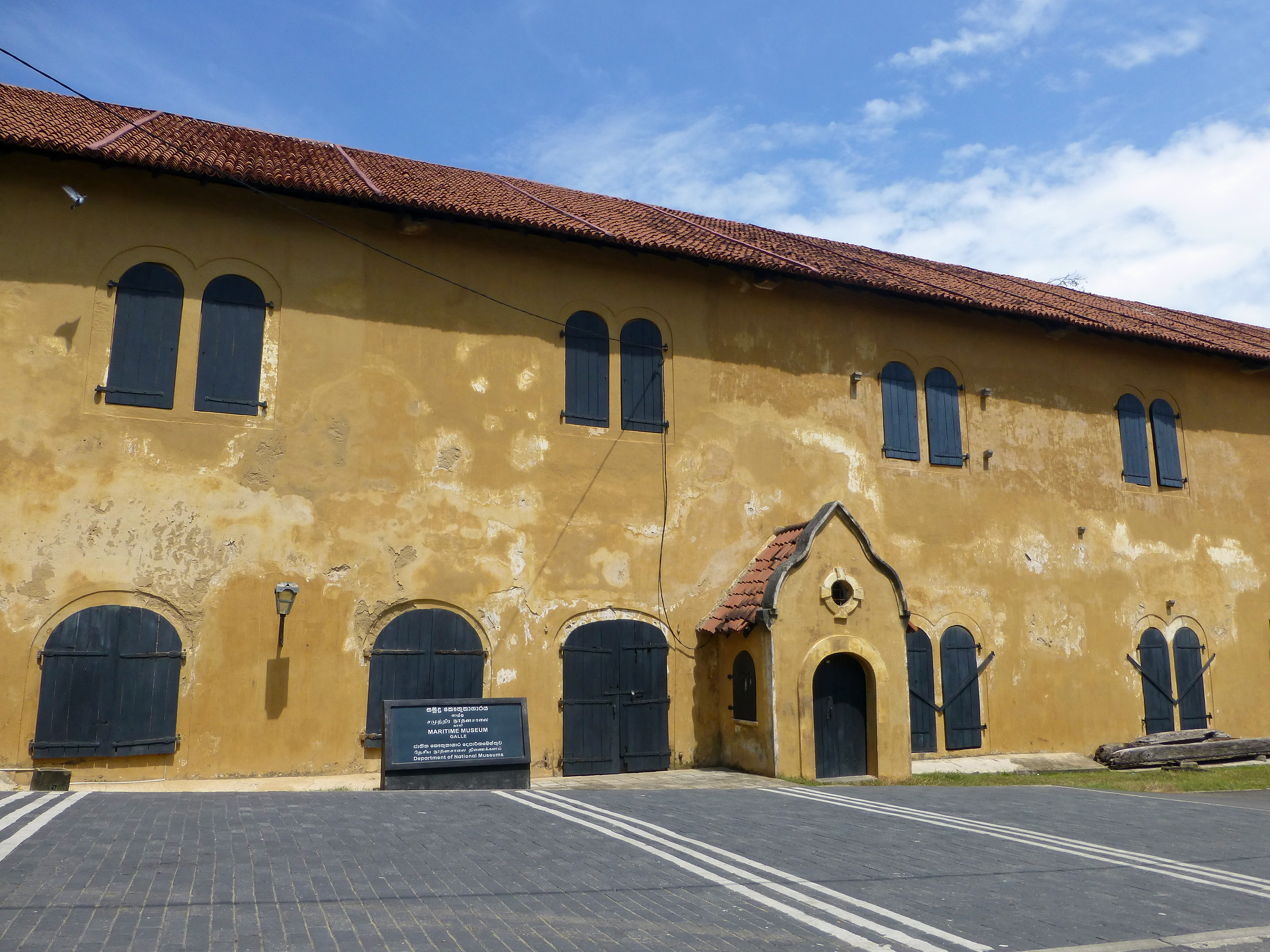
- Established: 9 May 1992; 34 years ago
- Location: Queens Street, Galle Fort, Galle, Sri Lanka
- Coordinates: 6.02796°N 80.21813°E
- Website: National Maritime Museum website

The National Maritime Museum or National Maritime Archaeology Museum in Galle, Sri Lanka is situated within Galle Fort. It was first opened to the public on 9 May 1992 and is located in a 1671 Dutch Warehouse above the Old Gate of Galle Fort. Whilst the building housing the museum survived the impact of the 26 December 2004 tsunami, the adjoining UNESCO Maritime Archaeology Unit was completely destroyed and all the exhibitions were flood damaged and the majority of maritime archeological artifacts were lost. Under Sri Lanka – Netherlands Cultural Co-operation Program, the Royal Government of Netherlands provided financial assistance for reconstruction of the Maritime Museum. After 3 years period of reconstruction, the Maritime Museum was re-opened to the public.

== 1992-2004 ==
The Dutch Warehouse building constructed during the latter part of the seventeenth century has, unlike in most other Dutch fortifications, a part of the building embodied into the thickness of the rampart. It is a two storey long building, and the original entry to the fort, bisects the ground floor.

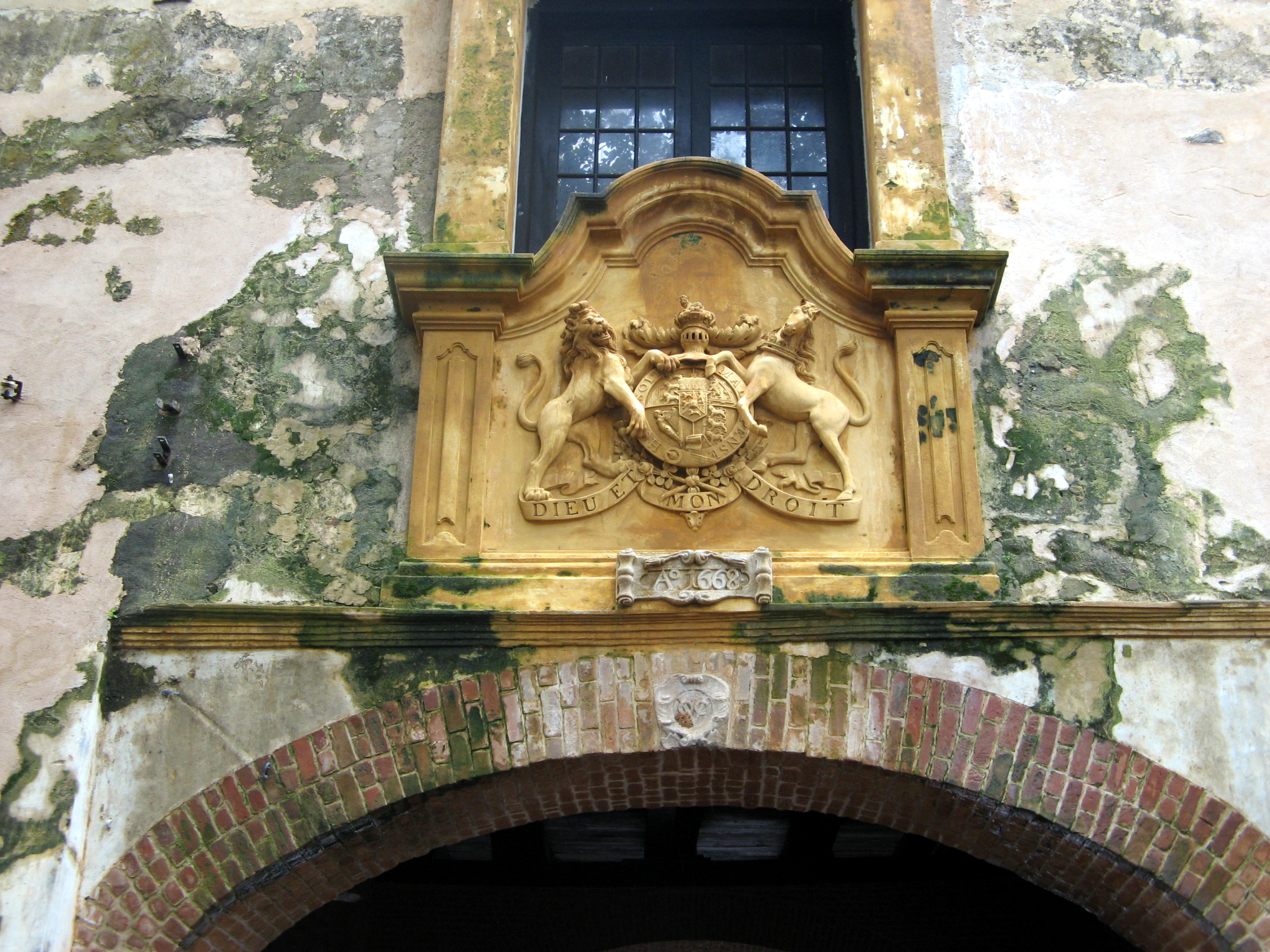
British Coat of Arms

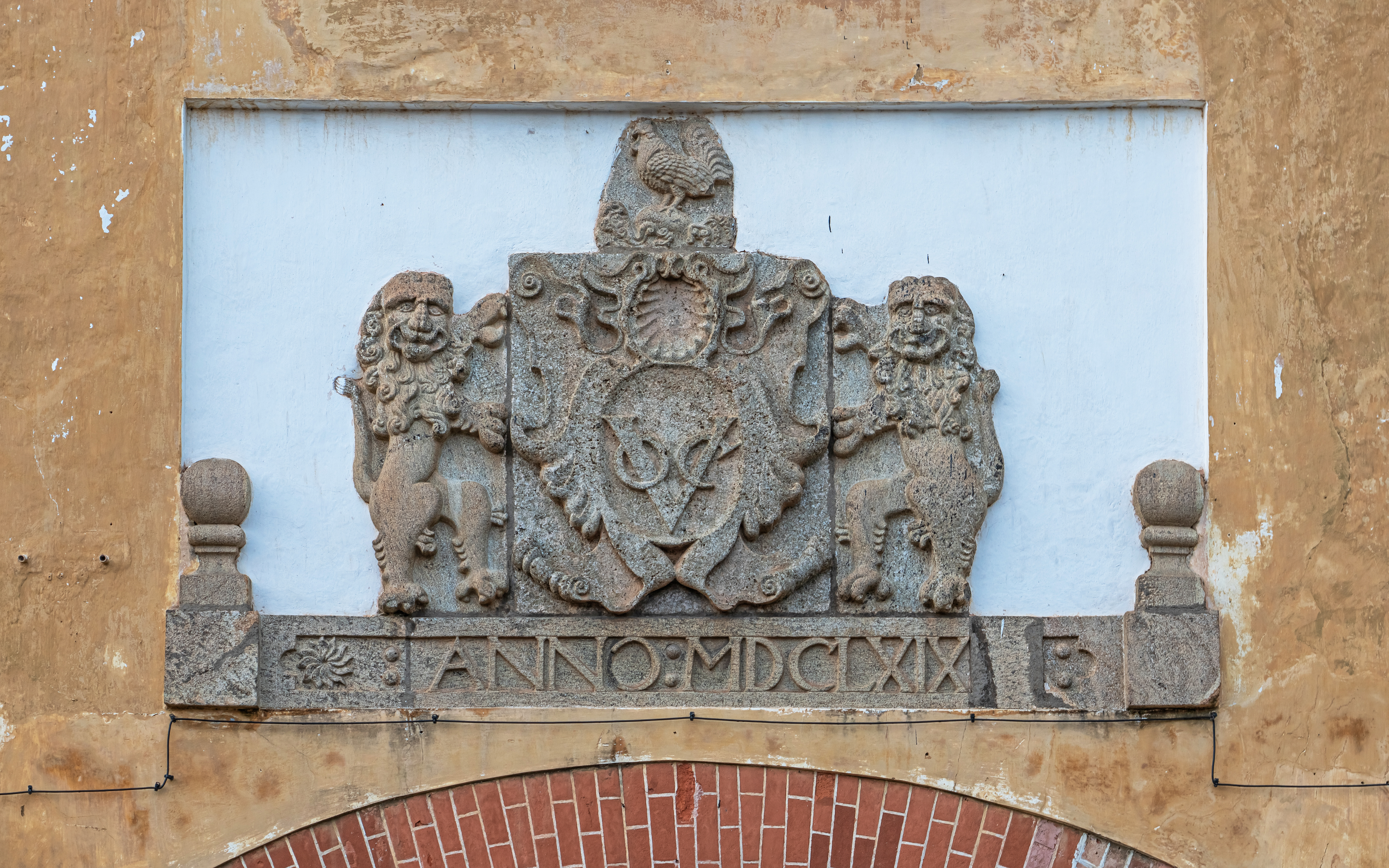
VOC insignia

Above the Old Gate the British Coat of Arms is seen inscribed at the entrance, the inner part of the gate has an inscription, with the date, 1669, the letters VOC, (an abbreviation of Verenigde Oostindindische Compagnie, the Dutch East India Company), and the insignia of a cock flanked by two lions. When the new gateway (the main or northern gate) was built by the British in 1873, piercing the main rampart between the Sun and Moon Bastions, the importance of the old gate was reduced, although it continued to be used as the main entrance to the harbour and port of Galle. During its history spanning well over three centuries, the functions of the Warehouse were many and varied. In post-independent Sri Lanka it was used as an administrative office complex until these offices were shifted to the new secretariat building outside Galle Fort. The building was subsequently reduced to a derelict building due to long years of negligence, lack of maintenance and natural decay.

Portion of the building was then used to house the National Maritime Museum which was opened to the public on 9 May 1992. The National Maritime Museum originally specialised in the fauna and flora of the sea. Artifacts consisted of underwater artifacts and scaled-down models of whales and fish. The museum displayed a variety of exhibits connected with sea-faring, maritime trade, fishing and sea-life, including relics retrieved from the 20-odd maritime archaeological sites around Galle.

Other exhibits included life-size dioramas of the traditional methods of fishing and the "walk into the sea" diorama, showing the natural coral beds, sea grass beds and deep sea fish. One of the final exhibits of the museum was a display of the causes of sea pollution, coast erosion, and the methods used to combat these problems.

== 2004 Tsunami ==
The museum suffered significant damage from the 2004 Asian tsunami, with only an estimated 20% of the 3,600 objects salvaged from shipwrecks within the waters of Galle port remaining. The tsunami caused the demolition of the UNESCO Archaeological Marine Unit, a joint Sri Lankan/Dutch Project, which was located on one of the old jetties just outside the northern gate of Galle Fort. The water entered the Town from the northern gate and flooded the premises of the former Maritime Museum, (up to a height of 2.2 metres), which was closed for renovations at the time of the tsunami.

The Dutch warehouse building at the fort, built in 1717, was renovated and was planned to house the museum at the end of 2008.

== 2010 Reopening ==
On 4 March 2010, it was reopened as the country's first National Maritime Archaeology Museum. The original 3,700 square metres (40,000 sq ft) Dutch warehouse building was fully renovated under a special grant of Rs. 177 million from the Kingdom of the Netherlands. The new museum has dual access, with the upper level entry linked with the present main gate, while the lower level access has reinstated the position of building as the prominent gateway. This has also made the building accessible for both pedestrian and vehicular traffic.

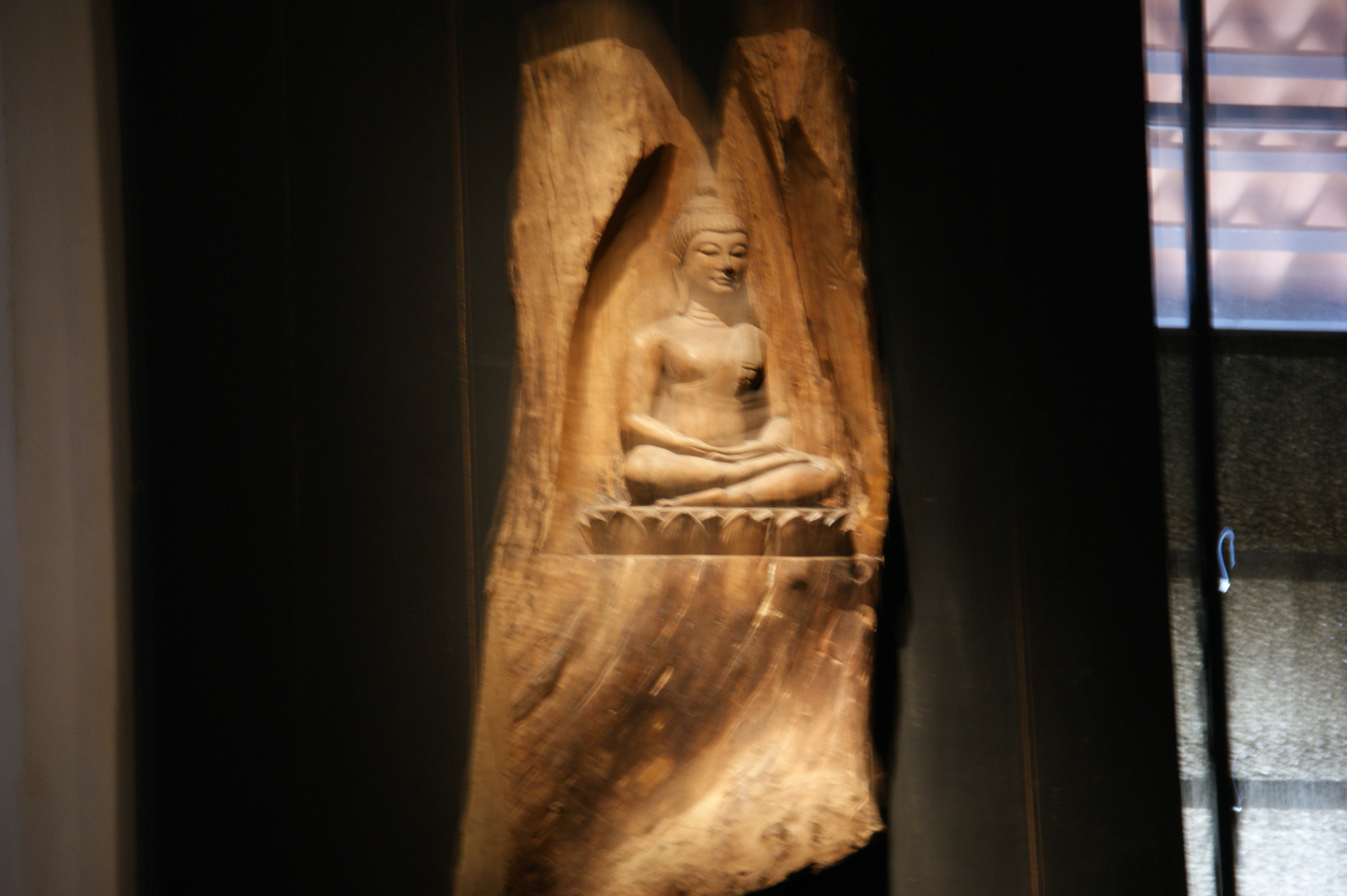
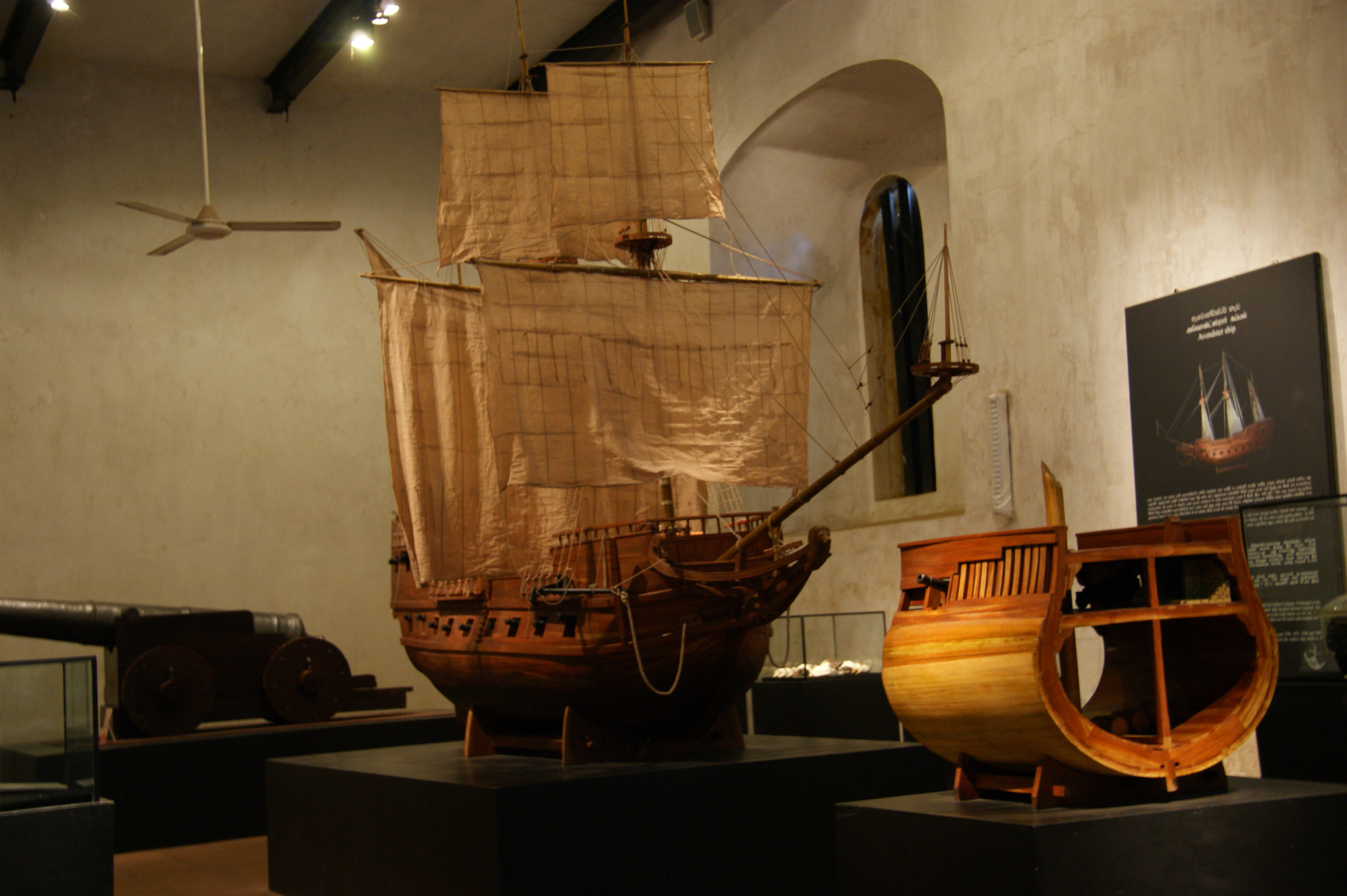
Some exhibits of the museum

Exhibits of marine artifacts found in underwater explorations are showcased in the Museum. There are maps, naval craft, ropes, earthenware, beer mugs, smoking pipes, barrels, vast numbers of articles including artillery guns and sailor shoes. Ship wrecks in the sea off the Southern coast is where these artifacts were recovered from, some of which are nearly 800 years old.

== See also ==
- Colombo Dutch Museum
- Colombo Port Maritime Museum
- National Museum of Galle
