= Mullaitivu Fort =

Mullaitivu fort
- Part of Mullaitivu
- Mullaitivu, Sri Lanka
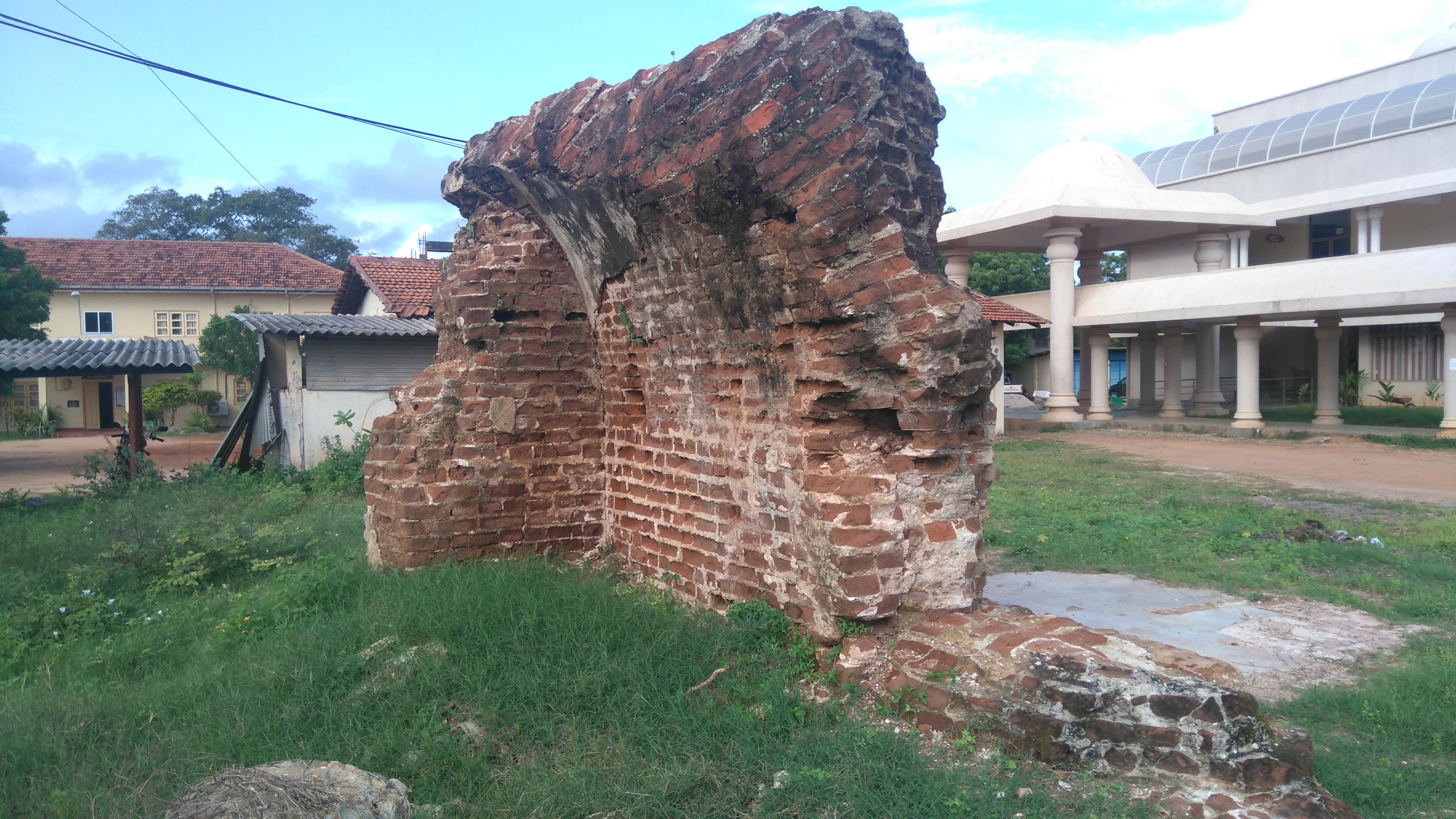
- Remains of Mullaitivu Fort

Site information
- Type: Defense fort
- Open to the public: yes

Location
- Location within Northern Province
- Coordinates: 9.283°N 80.8°E

Site history
- Built: 1715
- Built by: Dutch
- Battles/wars: Several

Mullaitivu fort (Tamil: முல்லைத்தீவுக் கோட்டை, romanized: Mullaittīvuk Kōṭṭai; Sinhala: මූලදූව බලකොටුව Mūladūwa Balakotuwa) was built by the Dutch in Mullaitivu, Sri Lanka. The original fort, a small wooden structure with palisades and earth, was erected in 1715. In 1721 the Dutch constructed a quadrangular fort on the site. The fort was initially erected to control the unauthorised commerce between the Chetties and the Kingdom of Kandy, it subsequently formed part of a strategic defence of Dutch territory against the Vannimai.

The fort was rebuilt by British during their occupation of the country in 1795. On 25 August 1803 the fort was captured and destroyed by forces led by Pandara Vanniyan. The commander of the fort, Captain von Driberg, and his troops garrisoned at the fort managed to escape by boats to Jaffna. Pandara Vanniyan and his forces were subsequently defeated by Captain von Driberg and the British troops at Kachchilamadu on 31 October 1803.Now it is located into Mullaitivu Kacheri.
