= Haldummulla =

Haldummulla හල්දුම්මුල්ල
- town
- Location within Sri Lanka
- Coordinates: 6°45′55″N 80°53′21″E
- Country: Sri Lanka
- Province: Uva Province
- District: Badulla District
- Elevation: 1,200 m (3,900 ft)
- Time zone: UTC+5:30 (Sri Lanka Standard Time Zone)

Haldummulla (Sinhala: හල්දුම්මුල්ල) is a town in the Badulla District, Uva Province, Sri Lanka.

The town suffered significant damage from a landslide in 2014.

Religion in Haldummulla DS Division (2012)
1. Buddhist (52.5%)
2. Hindu (43.8%)
3. Muslim (1.23%)
4. Roman Catholic (1.11%)
5. Other Christian (1.37%)
6. Other (0.06%)

== Attractions ==
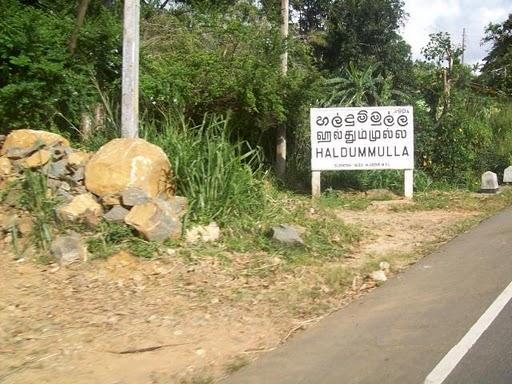

- Bambarakanda Falls
- Ohiya and Horton Plains via Kalupahana and Udaweriya Estate

== Archeological sites ==
=== Prehistoric burial ground ===
In 2010, a group of researchers found some evidence of a Prehistoric burial ground.

=== Prehistoric settlement ===
In 2011 archaeologists found evidence for an ancient settlement, the oldest and first ancient human dwelling to be found in the central hills in Sri Lanka.

=== Soragune Devalaya ===
The Soragune Devalaya is a Buddhist temple dedicated to Kataragama deviyo. It was constructed by a provincial ruler of the area, in 1582, who was seeking the blessing/protection of Kataragama, while he was away from the province. The temple was destroyed by the Dutch but was subsequently reconstructed. The temple was declared a protected archaeological site in July 2007.

=== Portuguese Fort ===
In the early 17th century the Portuguese established a stone fort at Haldummulla, which was used as a frontier post/staging area for Portuguese forces. It is also known as the Katugodalla fort. Only the foundations of the fort are still visible. The fort was declared a protected archaeological site in November 2002.

== See also ==
- Hunugalagala Limestone Cave
- Towns in Uva
