= Colombo Port Maritime Museum =

Maritime museum in Sri Lanka

Sri Lanka Ports Authority Maritime Museum
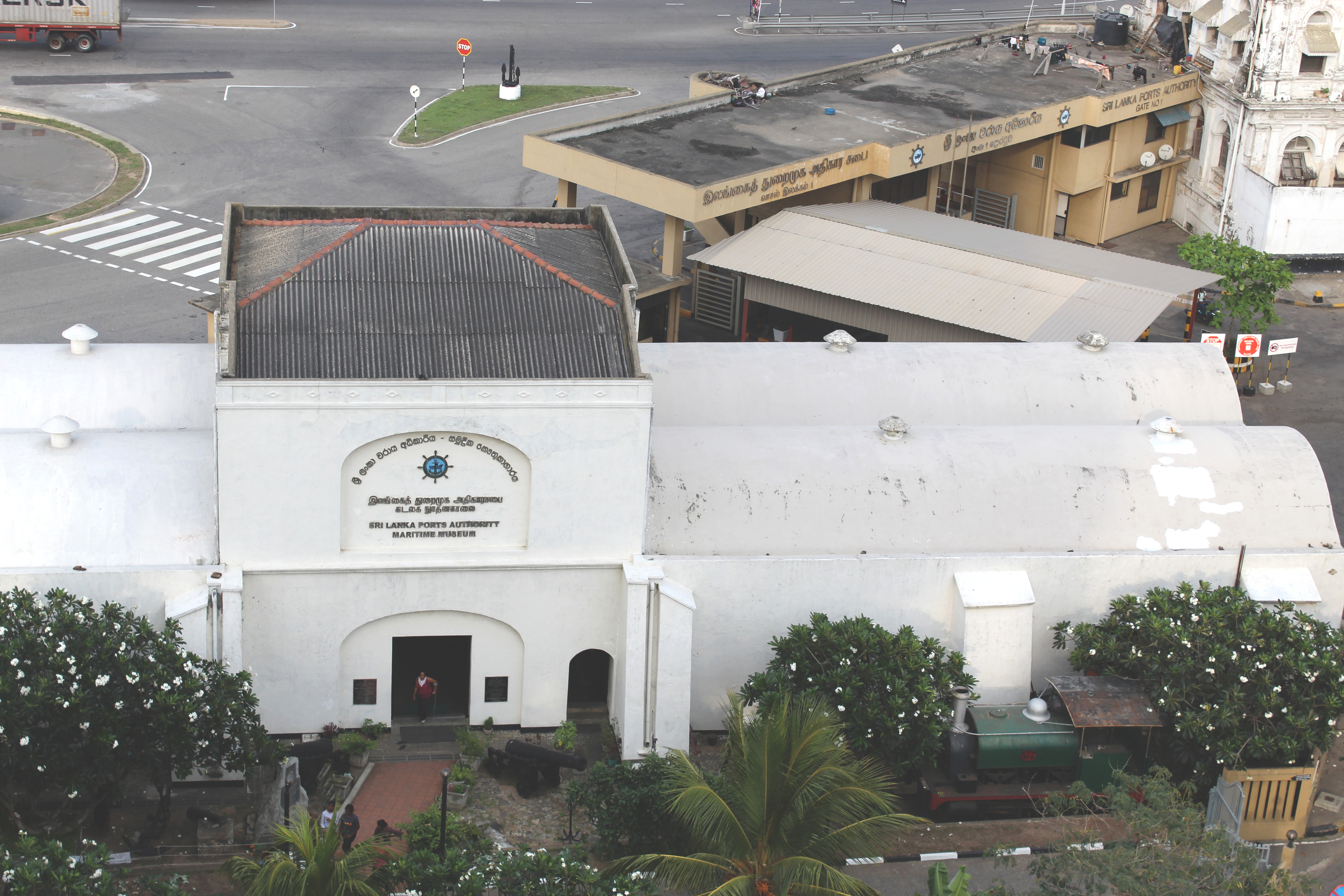
- Entrance of Sri Lanka Ports Authority Maritime Museum
- Established: August 2003
- Coordinates: 6.93858°N 79.84253°E
- Type: Maritime history
- Founder: Sri Lanka Ports Authority

The Sri Lanka Ports Authority Maritime Museum (වරාය අධිකාරය මූදුබඩ කෞතුකාගාරය ), commonly known as the Colombo Maritime Museum, is located at 19 Chaithya Road, Colombo, adjacent to the Colombo Port. The museum is operated and maintained by the Sri Lanka Ports Authority.

The museum is housed in a former Dutch prison, built in 1676, which is the only surviving Dutch period building within the Colombo Port area. The building has been refurbished and renovated to accommodate the artifacts at cost of Rs 25 million, as a result of the concept first presented by the Minister of Ports Development, Rehabilitation & Reconstruction, M. H. M. Ashraff. It was officially opened in August 2003, by the Minister of Shipping, Ports Development, Eastern Development and Muslim Religious Affairs, Rauff Hakeem.

Various items of historical significance relating to the ports of the country, it's maritime industry and the ocean around Sri Lanka are on display. Sculptures of King Vijeya and other significant characters are also on display along with model exhibits of ships.

There are also art works, and models symbolizing the systematic development of the Colombo Port and equipment used in Port operation during various times.

== See also ==
- National Maritime Museum, Galle
