= Queen's House (disambiguation) =

Queen's House is a former royal residence built between 1616 and 1635 in Greenwich, England.

Queen's House may also refer to:

== Buildings ==
- Buckingham Palace, London, England, known as Queen's House in the time of Queen Charlotte
- Queen's House, Colombo, Sri Lanka, now called President's House
- Queen's House, Jaffna, Sri Lanka
- Queen's House, at Hameau de la Reine, Versailles, France

== Other uses ==
- Queen's House Football Club, a 19th-century rugby club in Greenwich

== See also ==
- King's House (disambiguation)
- Queen's Castle, Seneca County, New York.
- List of royal palaces
- Category:Royal residences
