= Wolvendaal Church =

Doric church in Colombo, Sri Lanka

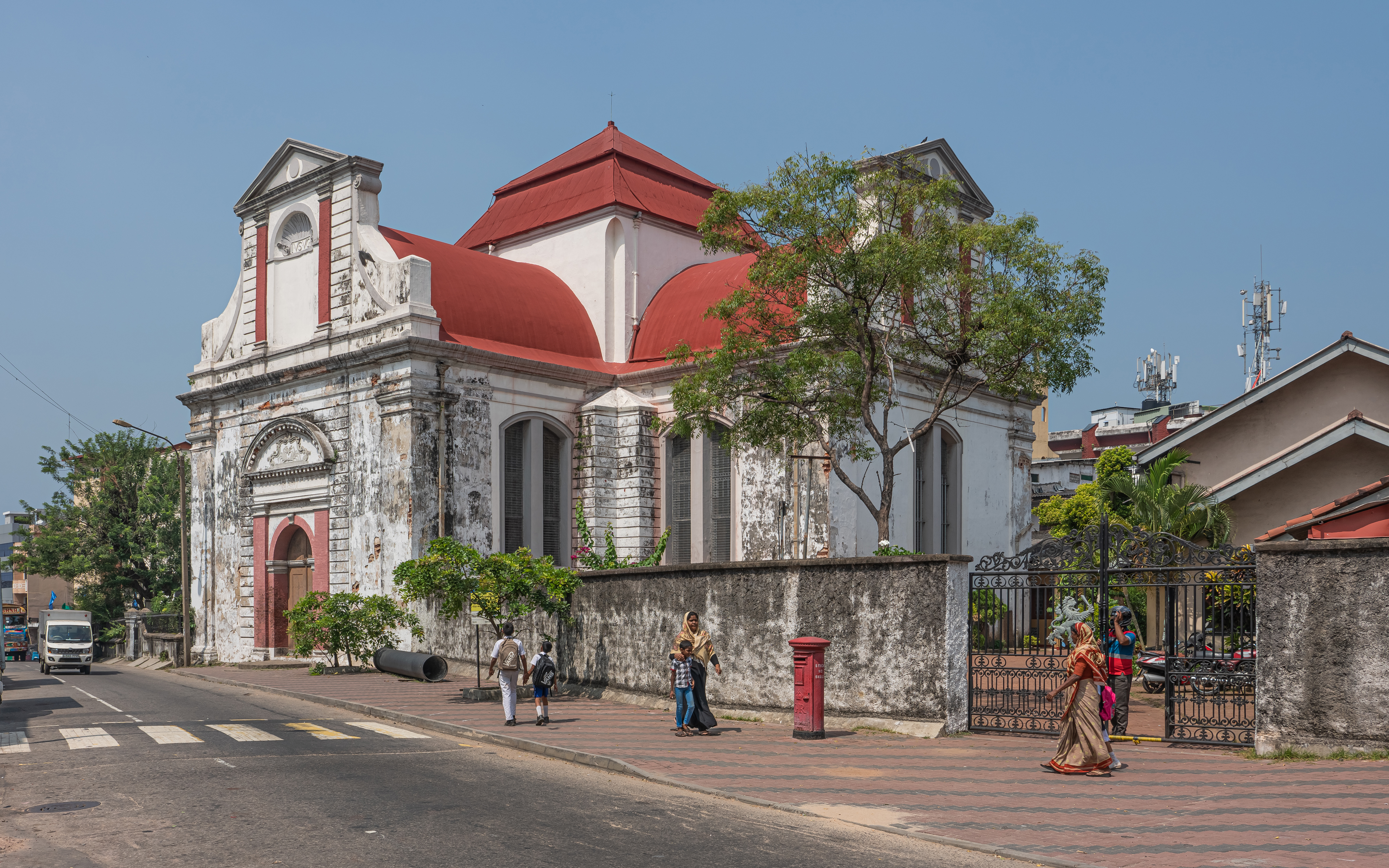

- Location within Central Colombo

Religion
- Affiliation: Christian Reformed Church in Sri Lanka
- Year consecrated: 6 March 1757
- Status: Active

Location
- Location: Colombo, Sri Lanka
- Coordinates: 6.9421°N 79.8590°E

Architecture
- Type: Church
- Style: Doric
- Groundbreaking: 1749
- Completed: 1757

Website
- www.wolvendaal.org

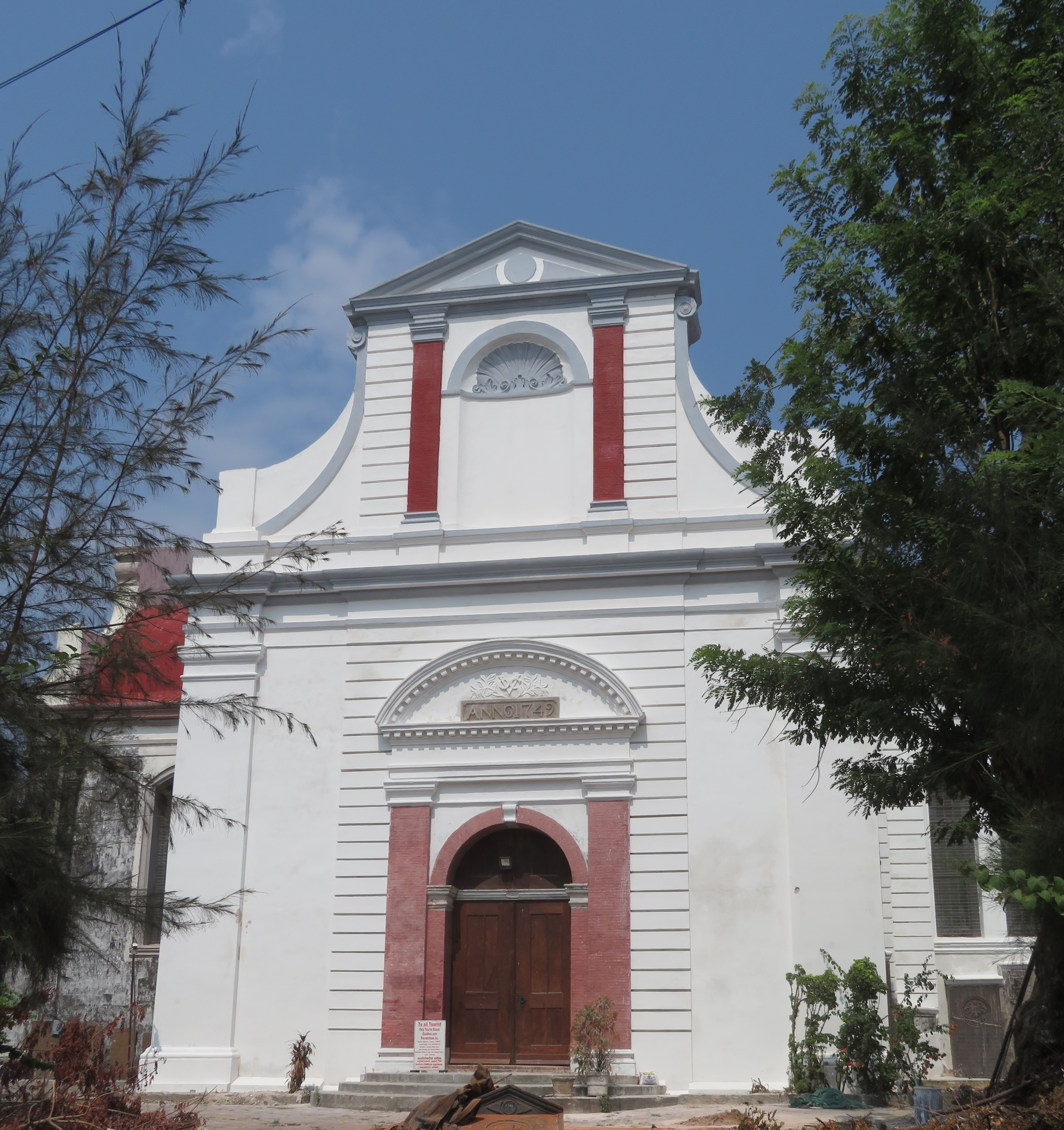
Exterior 2024

Wolvendaal Church (Wolvendaalse Kerk) is located in Pettah, a neighbourhood of Colombo. It is one of the most important Dutch colonial-era buildings in Sri Lanka and is one of the oldest Protestant churches still in use in the country.

== History ==
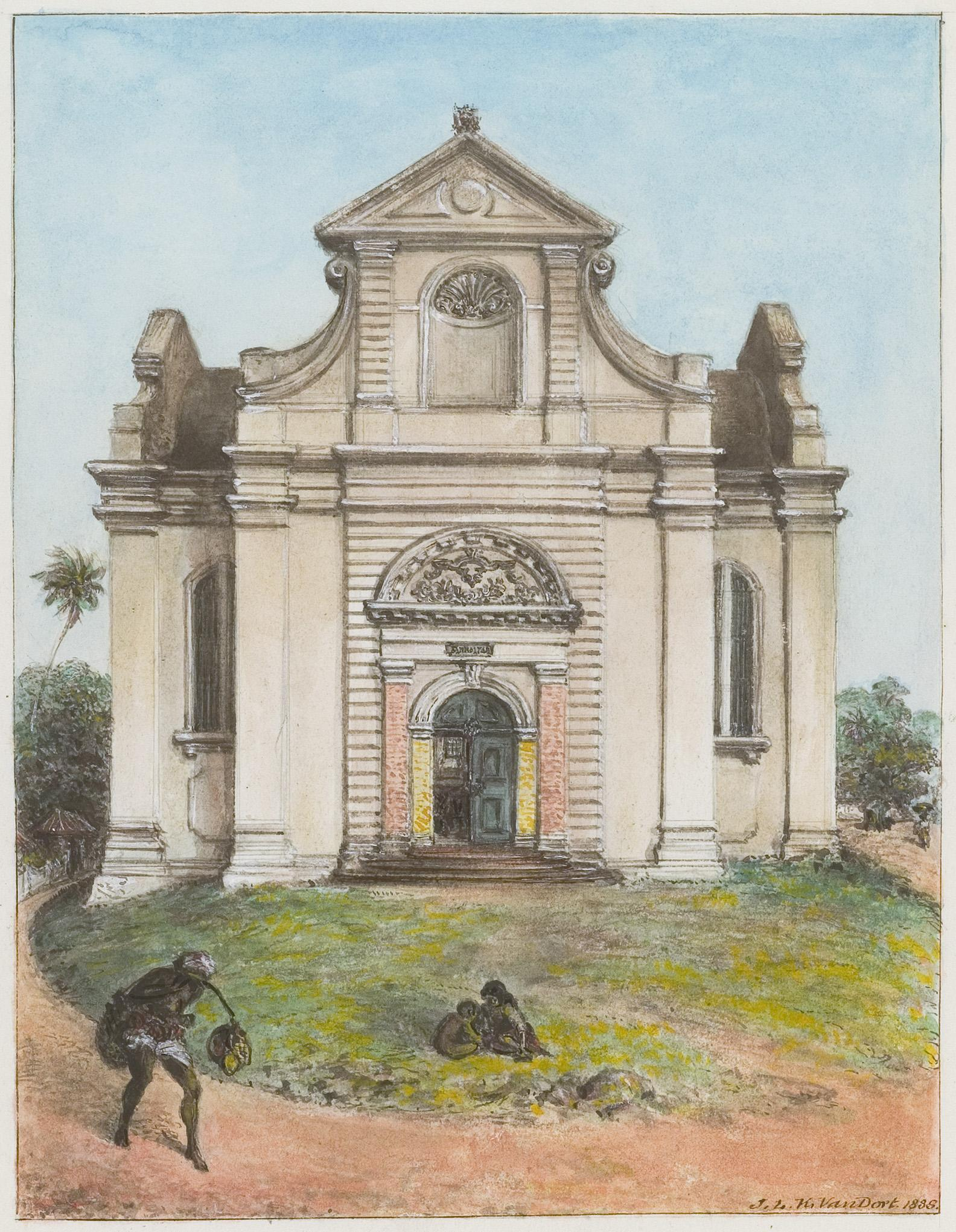
Watercolour painting of the Dutch Reformed Church (Wolvendaal), Colombo, by J. L. K. van Dort (1888)

In 1736 the governor of Ceylon, Gustaaf Willem van Imhoff, sought approval from the Dutch East India Company (Vereenigde Oost-Indische Compagnie or VOC) to demolish the existing church (Kasteel Kerk) within the Colombo Fort and construct a new one on the same site. However, the VOC refused this request, and it was not until the arrival of Governor Julius Valentyn Stein van Gollenesse in 1743 that the impasse was overcome. He decided that the new church would be erected in the area beyond the city walls, which at the time was swamp and marshland. The Europeans mistook the packs of roaming jackals for wolves, and the area became known as Wolvendaal (Wolf's Dale or Wolf's Valley). The site that was selected was on a hill which commanded views across the town and over the harbour and was in proximity to the town's entrance. The site was also occupied by a small church, which had existed from the earliest period of Dutch occupation, when the Wolvendaal neighbourhood was a quiet suburban parish.

The foundations of the church were laid in 1749 and it took eight years to build. It was completed on 6 March 1757, when it was dedicated for public worship by Rev. Matthias Wirmelskircher, rector of the Colombo Seminary. At the dedication there were two governors present, Joan Gideon Loten and his successor Jan Schreuder, together with members of the Council, reverend ministers (Predikants), prominent Burghers and their families.

== Architecture ==
The church was constructed in the Doric style of the period, in the form of a Greek cross (i.e. legs of equal length), with walls nearly 1.5 m (five feet) thick, constructed of unusually large kabok (clay ironstone) with coral and lime plaster. The high roof in the middle of the building resembles a dome and was originally arched with brick and roofed in blue Bangor slate roof tiles surmounted with a brazen lion. This lion had a crown on its head, bearing a sword in one hand and seven arrows in the other, representing the seven united provinces of the Dutch Republic. In 1856, a bolt of lightning destroyed the lion and seriously damaged the dome. The roof was later replaced with an iron covering. The church is capable of seating 1,000 persons.

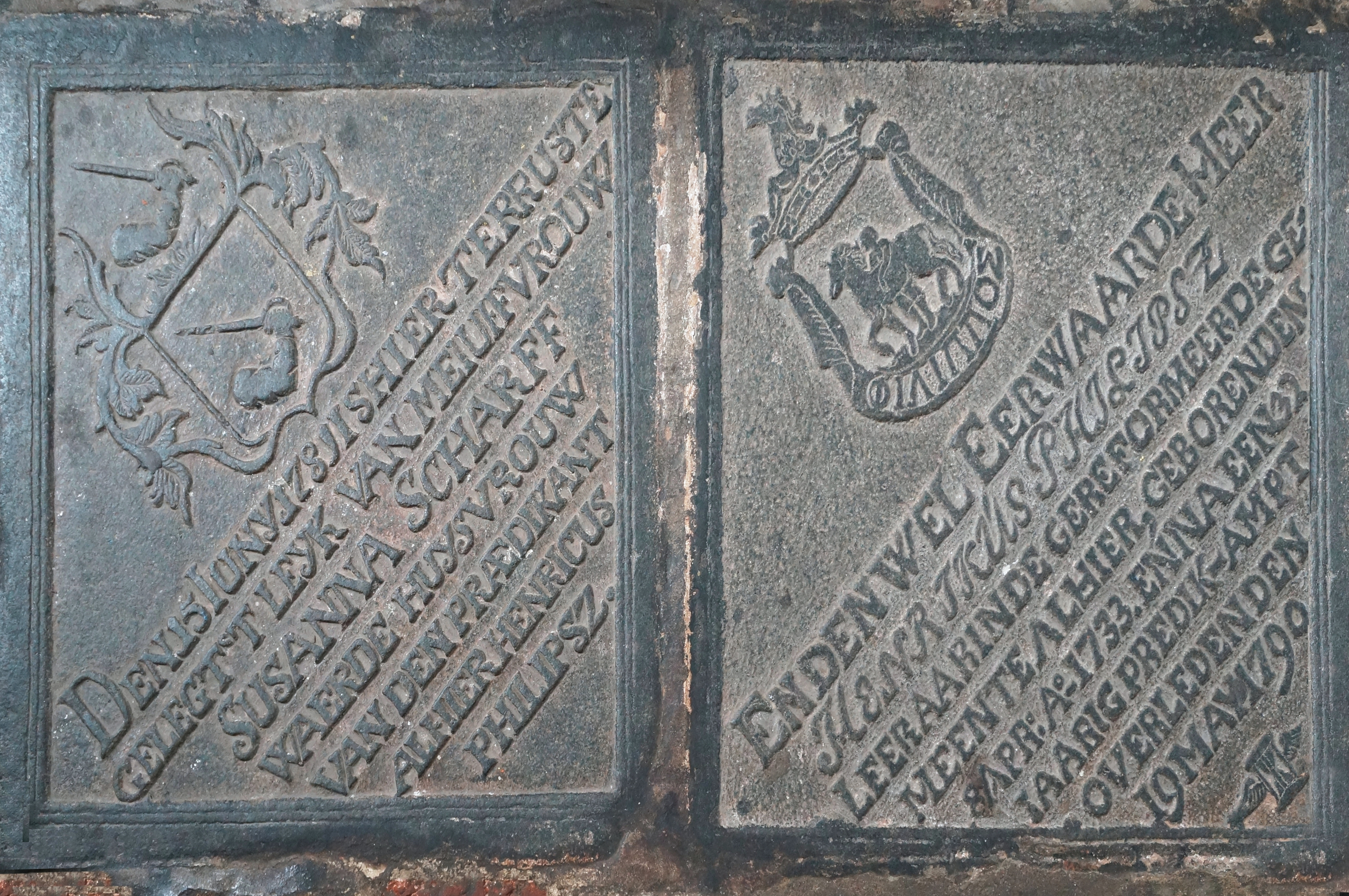
Tombstones of reverend Henricus Philipszoon and his wife Susanna Scharff

Inside the church there is a solidly constructed State Pew (to accommodate the Dutch governor) with numerous ebony and calamander church chairs (kerkstoels), dating back to the 17th and 18th centuries. The baptismal font, on an ornately carved tripod stand, dates back to 1667. The pulpit is typical for a Dutch Reformed church, where the minister stands higher than the congregation on a richly ornamented wooden structure. On the walls of the church are many mural tablets while there are many more built into the external walls. The floor is paved with granite flagstones (purportedly brought from Holland) interdispersed with engraved tombstones, of those who lie buried within the church or whose remains were relocated from the Kasteel Kerk. Many famous names of 300-year Sri Lankan history, Dutch, Burgher, Singhalese, Tamil and English, can be found among the gravestones within and outside the church. There are five Dutch governors buried at the church, including the last governor, Johan Gerard van Angelbeek, who died in Colombo in 1799, three years after the British occupation.

From the time of its dedication through to the end of Dutch rule, Wolvendaal was the principal place of worship, although Kasteel Kerk remained the main religious seat for the European and local officials of the VOC, until it was demolished in 1813.

The organ is the oldest organ in Sri Lanka. The seats for the governor and his officials, who sat higher than the sitting congregation, are still well-preserved with sight worthy wood carvings.

== Current use ==
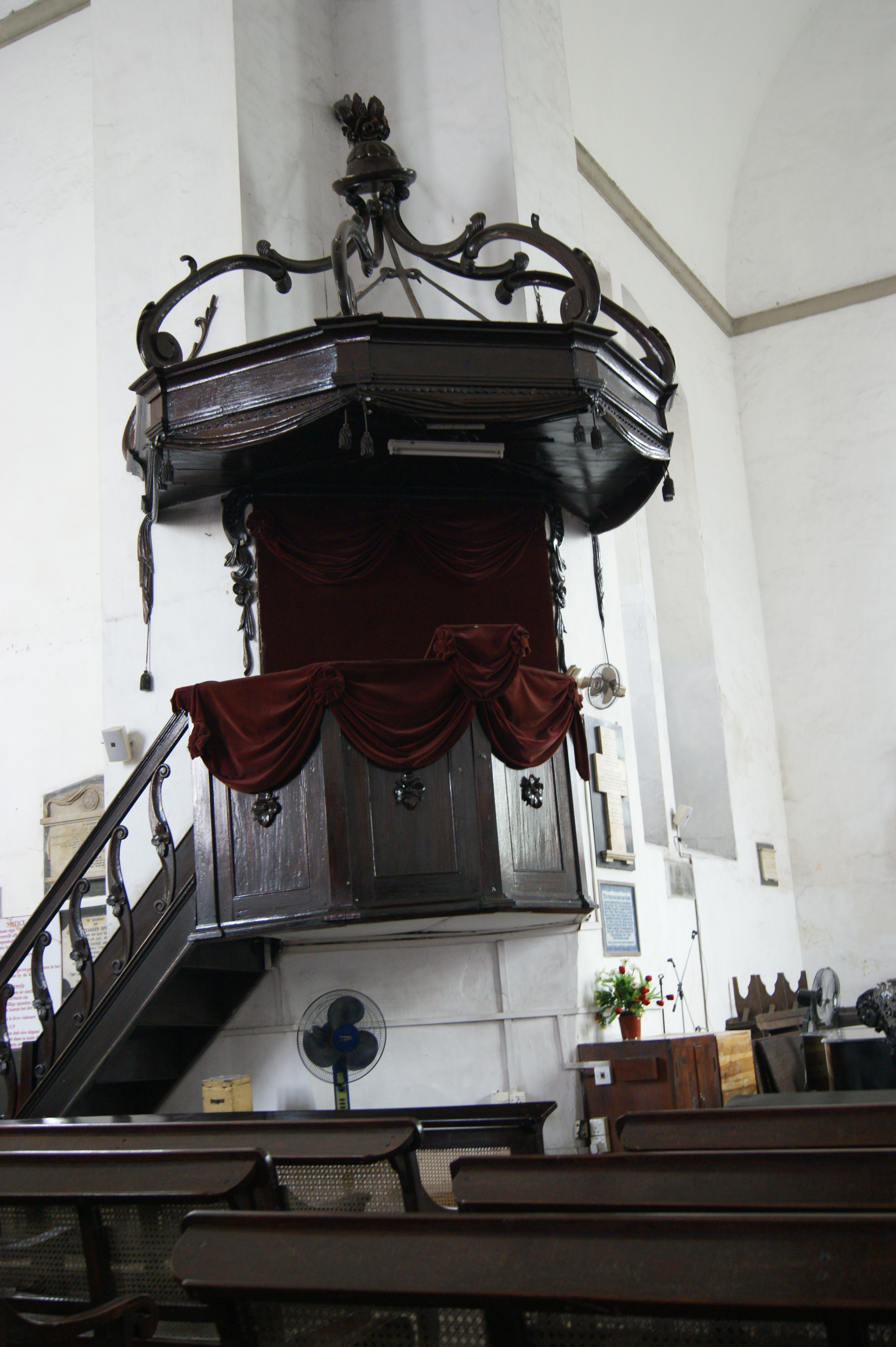
The typically Dutch design-pulpit in the church.

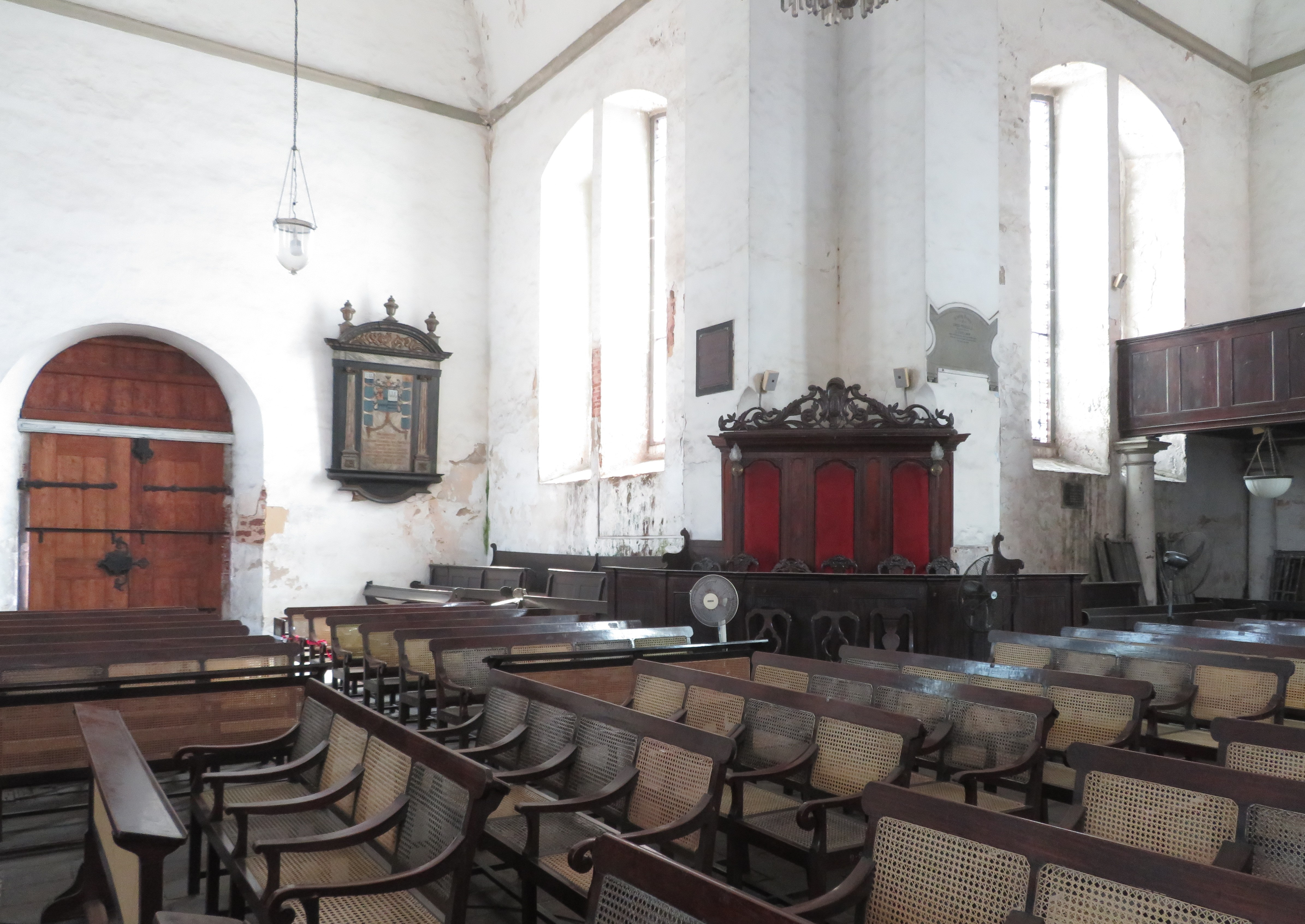
Governor's Seat

The Dutch Reformed Church is currently known as the Christian Reformed Church of Sri Lanka. The church has several locations throughout the Colombo area. Wolvendaal Church is the only Dutch church on the island that has been continually in use, with in 2018 services in Tamil, Sinhalese and English every Sunday. A similar Dutch Reformed Church building is the Groote Kerk in Galle.

In January 2005 the Dutch Reformed Church (DRC) established the Wolvendaal Foundation to preserve the church's architecture. Its ultimate aim is to further cordial relations between the various races and religions on the island.

== Other Dutch Reformed Church buildings in Sri Lanka ==
- Groote Kerk, Galle
- Dutch Reformed Church, Kalpitiya
- Dutch Reformed Church, Matara
- Kruys Kerk, Jaffna
