= Christian Reformed Church in Sri Lanka =

Protestant church in Sri Lanka

Christian Reformed Church of Sri Lanka
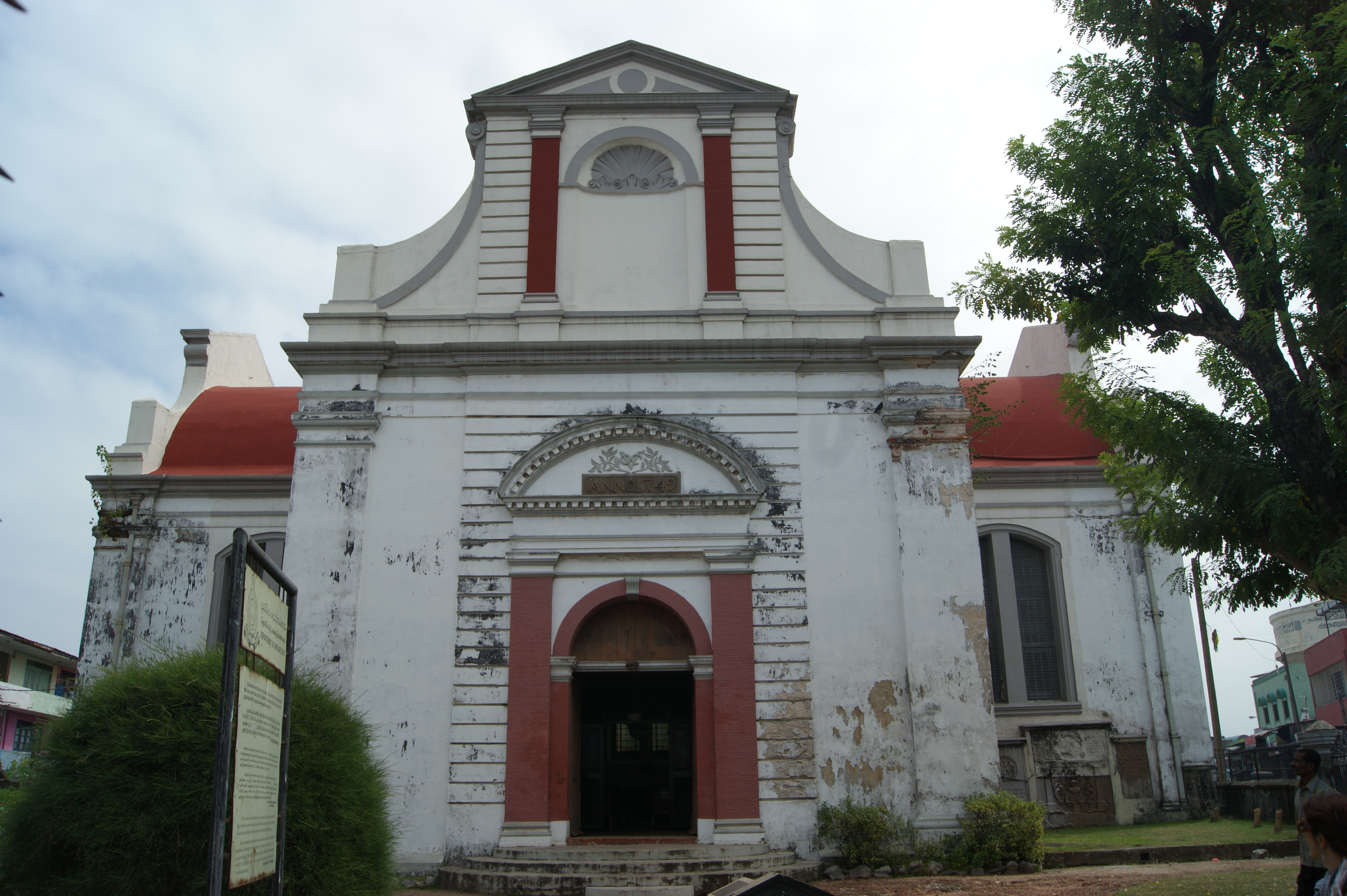
- Wolvendaal Church
- Classification: Protestant
- Orientation: Reformed, Calvinist
- Polity: Presbyterian
- Associations: World Communion of Reformed Churches, World Reformed Fellowship, National Christian Council in Sri Lanka, National Evangelical Christian Alliance in Sri Lanka
- Region: Sri Lanka
- Origin: 1642; Sri Lanka
- Branched from: Dutch Reformed Church
- Separations: Lanka Reformed Church
- Congregations: 31
- Members: 5,000

The Christian Reformed Church of Sri Lanka (formerly known as the Dutch Reformed Church of Sri Lanka) is the oldest Protestant church on the island.

== History ==
=== Beginnings and development ===
On 6 October 1642, the first Protestant church service was held in Galle, following the capture of the fort at Galle by Willem Jacobszoon Coster in 1640. Protestantism was introduced as a missionary religion in Sri Lanka in 1658 by Dutch missionaries after the Dutch defeated the Portuguese on the island. When the Dutch took over there were already three religions present, Buddhism, Hinduism and Catholicism. All Roman Catholic churches, schools, and monasteries were transferred to the Dutch Reformed Church. The DRC church membership grew rapidly, and in the 18th century there were over 53,000 members in Colombo and 200,000 in Jaffna. The Reformed Calvinist faith was propagated by its schools. During a period the Reformed Church was the state religion. The Dutch period started in 1656 and lasted until the late 1700s. In 1796 the British occupied the Maritime Province of Ceylon, and Ceylon remained a British Crown Colony for the next 150 years. When the island became a British colony, many Dutch ministers left, and the church system collapsed. In the 19th and 20th centuries DRC church membership consisted of the Burghers, a Dutch word for citizens. They were not necessarily of Dutch origin, but were persons who held to Calvinist faith. But in the 19th century membership begin to broaden, with separate Tamil and Singhala congregations being formed.

=== Recent history ===
In 1992 the church celebrated its 350th anniversary. It is the oldest Protestant denomination in the island of Sri Lanka, and the Wolvendaal (which means the 'Valley of Wolves') Church is the oldest Protestant church building. The latter church celebrated its 250th anniversary in 2007. Over the past years attempts have been made to increase church membership through evangelism. In 2008 the Dutch Reformed Church changed its name to the Christian Reformed Church in Sri Lanka.

There has been a movement for the amalgamation of traditional Protestant Churches (including the Church of Ceylon, Methodist Church, Lanka Baptist Sangamaya, Salvation Army, Presbyterian Church of Sri Lanka and the Christian Reformed Church in Sri Lanka (formerly the Dutch Reformed Church) as well as the Jaffna Diocese of the Church of South India into one body, namely the Church of Sri Lanka.

== Current status ==
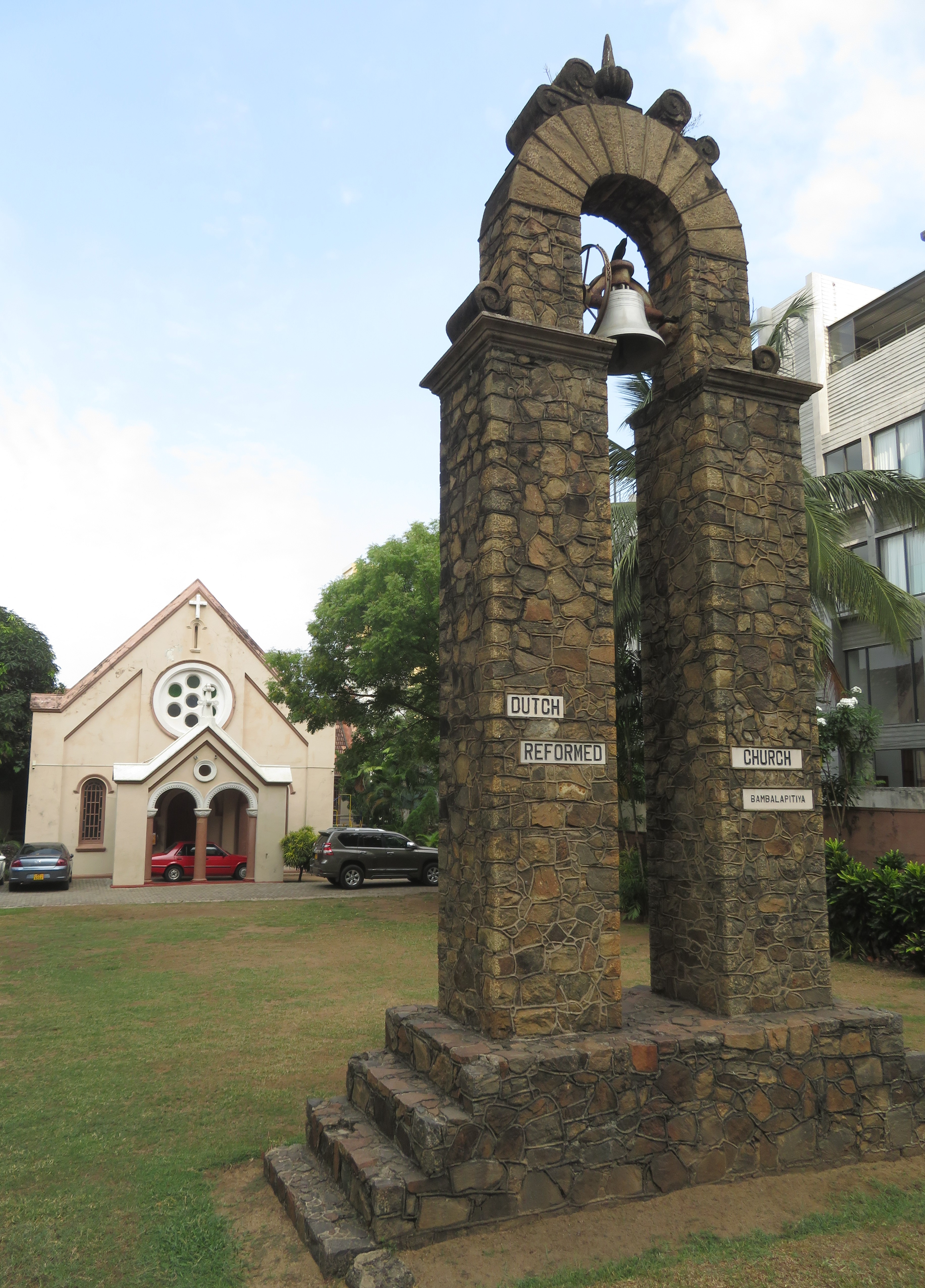
Christian Reformed Church, Galle Road, Colombo

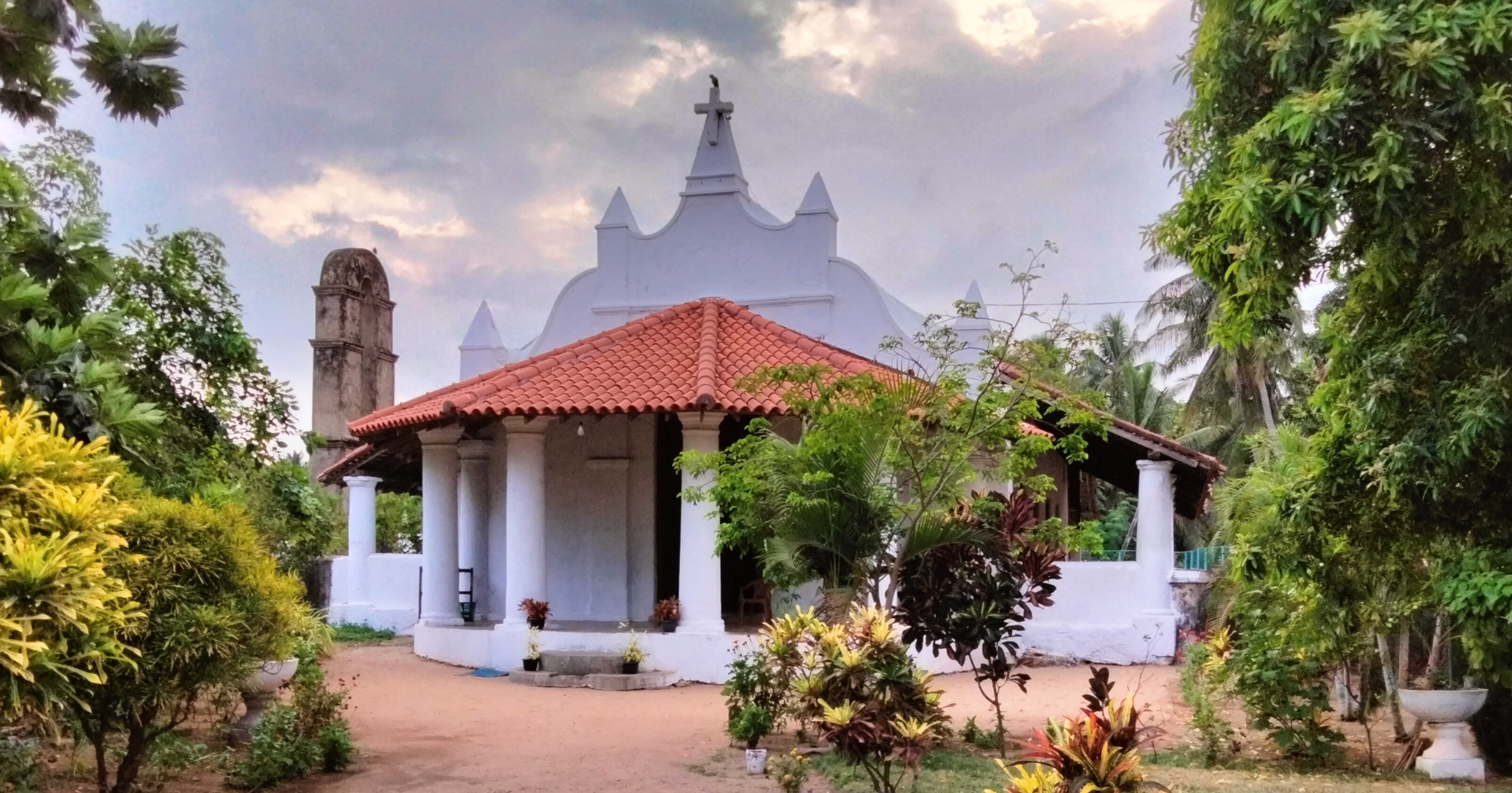
Christian Reformed Church in Kalpitiya

The Christian Reformed Church of Sri Lanka currently has 31 churches and over 5,000 adherents. The church office is located at Galle Road, Colombo. The Christian Reformed Church of Sri Lanka owns several historical church buildings, e.g. in Kalpitiya, Matara and Galle.

== Doctrine and practice ==
=== Creeds ===
- Apostles Creed
- Athanasian Creed
- Nicene Creed

=== Confessions ===
- Belgic Confession
- Canons of Dort
- Heidelberg Catechism

== Relationships ==
- National Christian Council in Sri Lanka
- National Christian Evangelical Alliance in Sri Lanka

The church has sister church relations with the Christian Reformed Church in North America, Dutch Reformed Church of South Africa and since 2008 the fraternal relation was restored with the Reformed Churches in the Netherlands (Liberated)

- World Communion of Reformed Churches - a new ecumenical body of Presbyterian and Reformed churches represent over 80 million Reformed Christians worldwide
- World Reformed Fellowship - promotes unity between conservative Reformed churches

== See also ==
- Wolvendaal Church, Colombo
- Dutch Reformed Church, Kalpitiya
- Dutch Reformed Church, Matara
- Groote Kerk, Galle
- Kayman's Gate
