= Jaffna Fort =

Fort

Coordinates: 9°39′43.648″N 80°0′29.89″E

- Part of Jaffna
- Jaffna, Sri Lanka
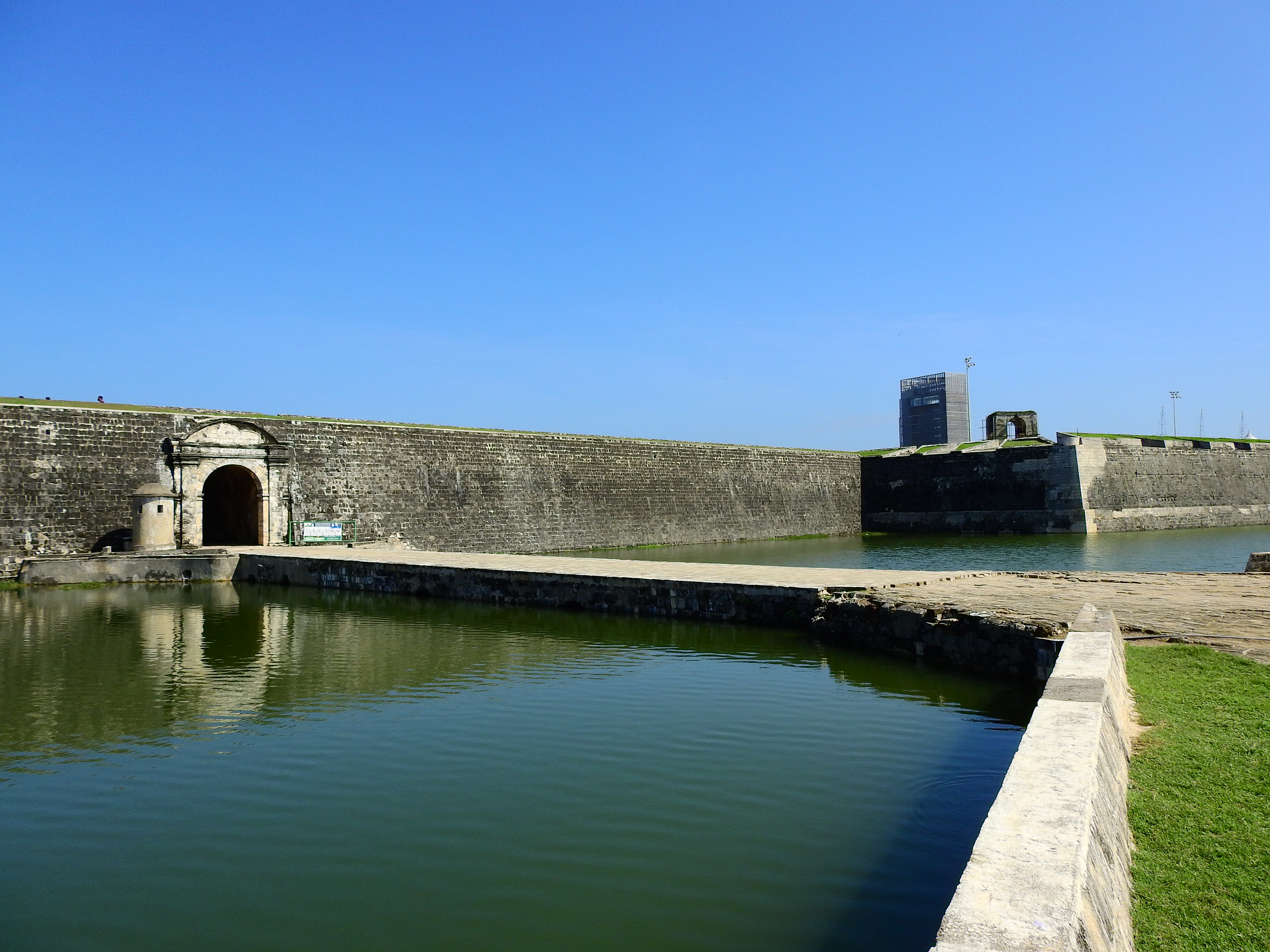
- Entrance of Jaffna Fort that was originally built by the Portuguese and renovated by the Dutch in 1680

Site information
- Type: Defense fort
- Controlled by: Government of Sri Lanka
- Open to the public: Yes
- Condition: Renovated

Location
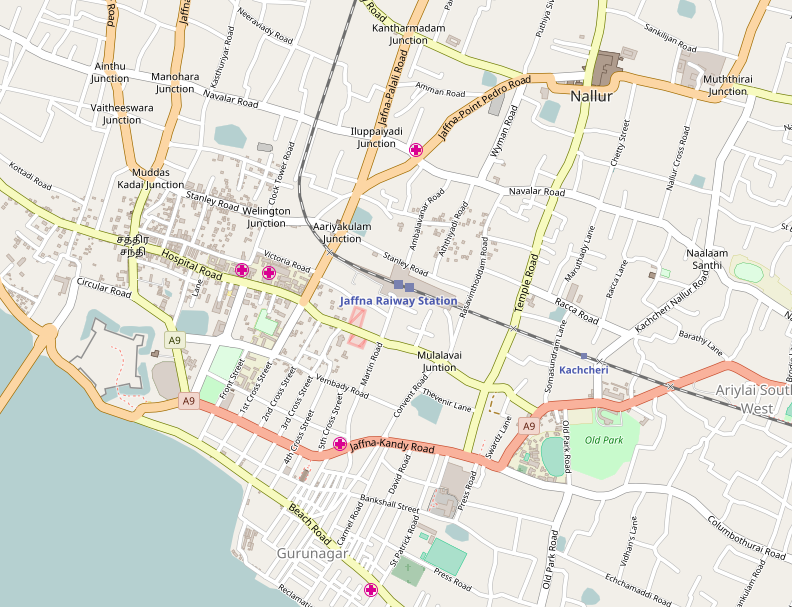
- Location in central Jaffna

Site history
- Built: 1618 - 1625
- Built by: Portuguese
- In use: 1625 –
- Materials: Granite Stones
- Battles/wars: Many

Garrison information
- Occupants: Administration of Sri Lanka

Jaffna Fort (Tamil: யாழ்ப்பாணக் கோட்டை, romanized: Yāḻppāṇak Kōṭṭai; Sinhala: යාපනය බලකොටුව Yapanaya Balakotuwa) is a fort built by the Portuguese at Jaffna, Sri Lanka, in 1618 under Phillippe de Oliveira following the Portuguese invasion of Jaffna. The fort is located near the coastal village of Gurunagar. Owing to numerous miracles attributed to the statue of the Virgin Mary in the church nearby, the fort was named as Fortress of Our Lady of Miracles of Jafanapatão (Fortaleza de Nossa Senhora dos Milagres de Jafanapatão). It was captured by the Dutch under Rijcklof van Goens in 1658, who expanded the structure. In 1795, it was taken over by the British, and remained under the control of a British garrison until 1948. As the only large military fort in the country, because of the presence of only government and military buildings within its ramparts, it was garrisoned by a detachment of the Ceylon Army.

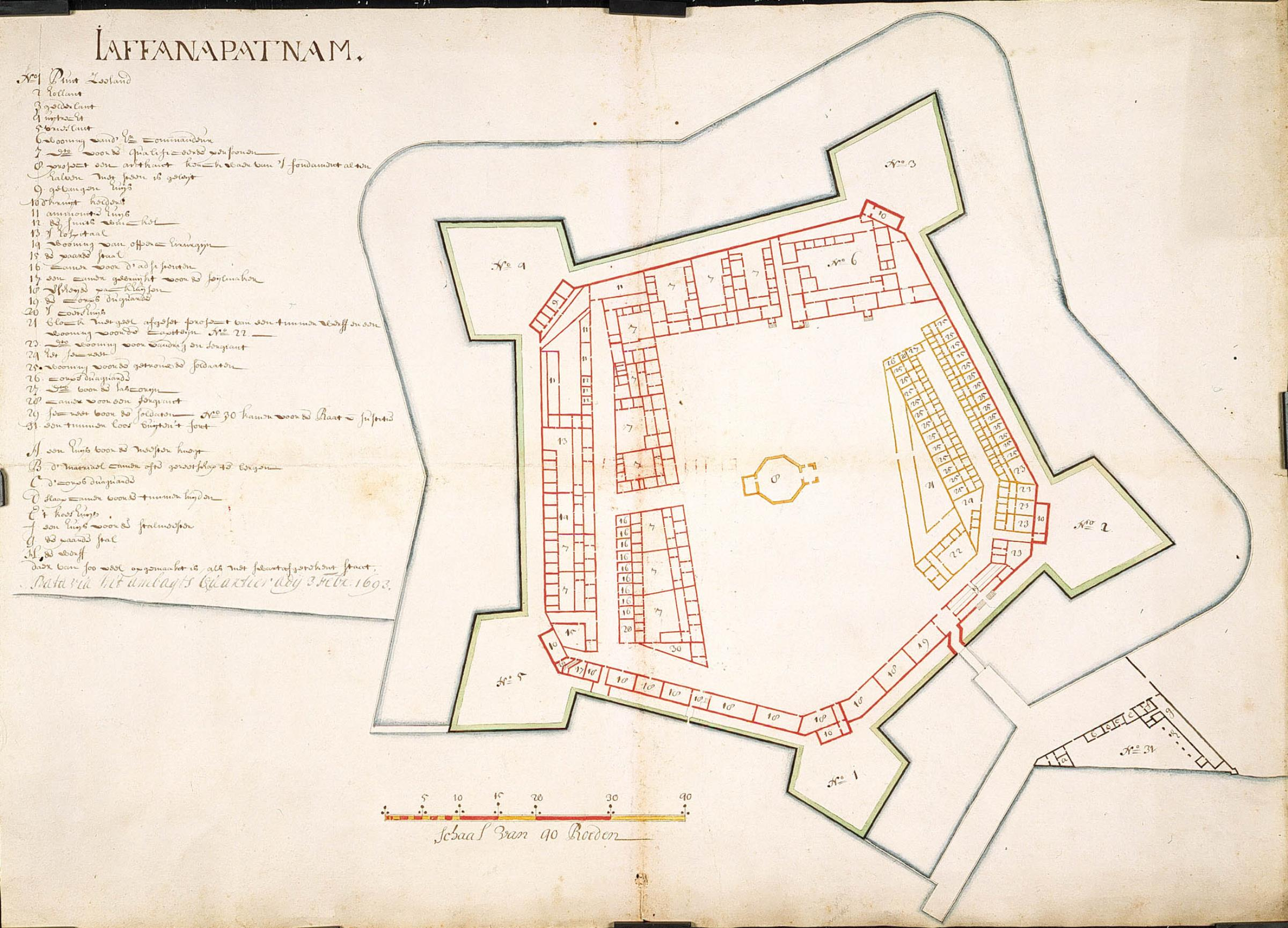
Map of the fort from 1693

With the onset of the Sri Lankan Civil War, it came under siege on several occasions and was the scene of pitched battles. From 1985 to 1995 it was under the control of the Liberation Tigers of Tamil Eelam (LTTE); during this time the LTTE destroyed several key features of the fort to stop the Army from gaining control due to the site being used to stage attacks, but it was recaptured by the Sri Lanka Army in 1995 after a 50-day siege during Operation Riviresa. It was also vandalised by locals to rebuild houses damaged from the war. Today it remains garrisoned by a detachment of the Sri Lanka Army with limited access to visitors and is being renovated with Dutch funding.

Buildings inside the fort include the governor's residence (King's House), Queen's House, Kruys Church, the Garrison Parade Ground, Police quarters and several buildings from the Portuguese era.
