= Kruys Church =

Church in Sri Lanka

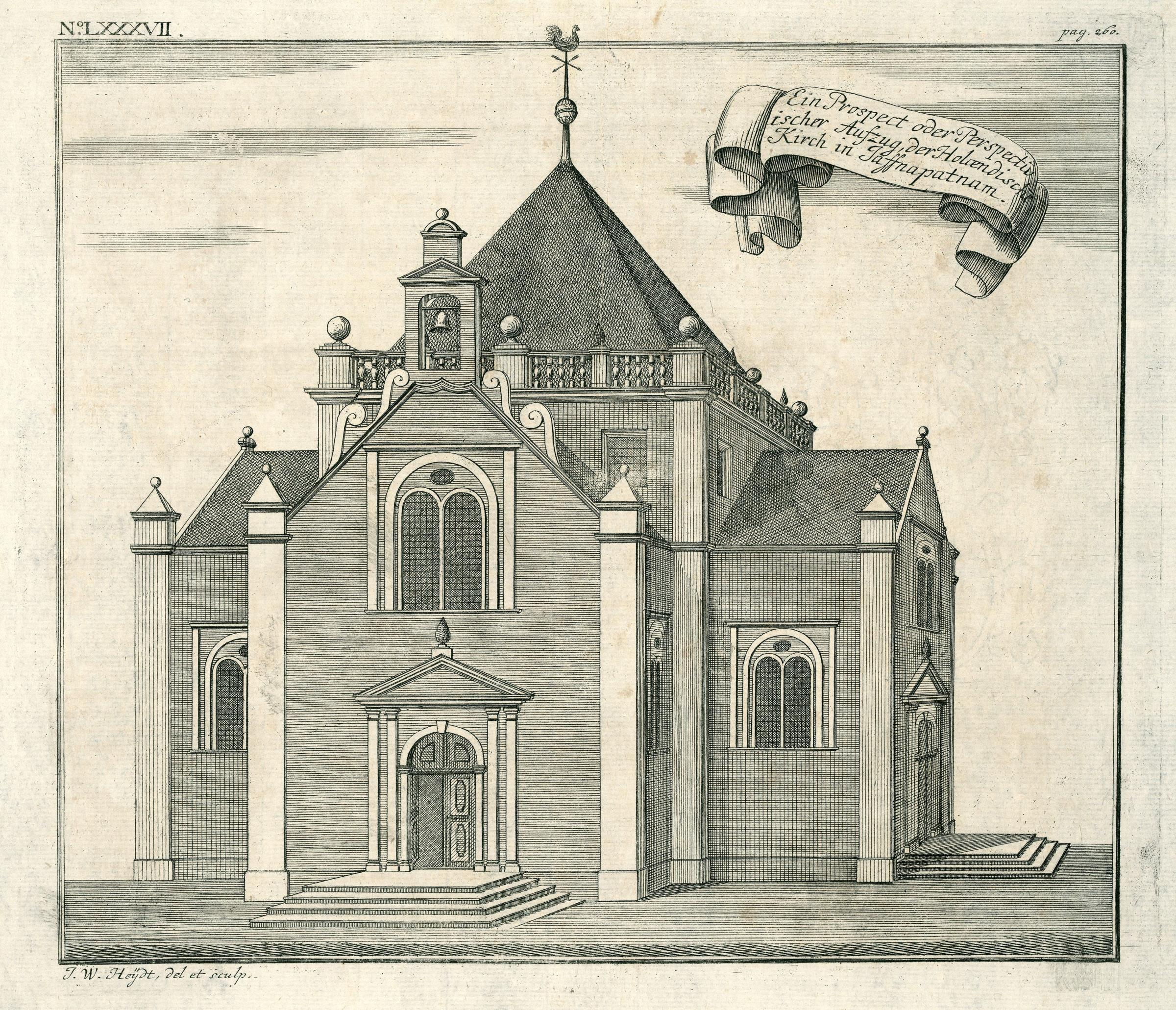

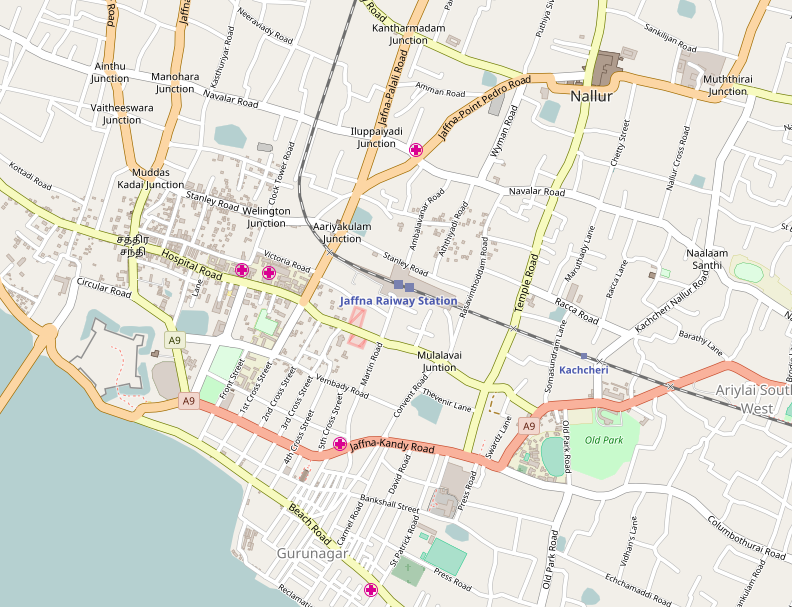
- Location in central Jaffna

Religion
- Affiliation: Dutch Reformed Church
- Year consecrated: 1755
- Status: demolished

Location
- Location: Jaffna fort
- Coordinates: 9.662257°N 80.009171°E

Architecture
- Type: Church
- Style: Doric
- Completed: 1706

Website
- www.wolvendaal.org

Kruys Church or Kruys Kerk is located within the Jaffna fort in Jaffna, Sri Lanka and is situated near the entrance to the fort. The church was built by the Dutch in 1706 and was one of the oldest Protestant churches in the country.

== History ==
Kruys Kerk (Cross Church) constructed in the form of a Greek cross, in the south-eastern section of Jaffna fort. The church was erected in 1706, nearly half a century prior to the construction of the Wolvendaal Church in Colombo and the Groote Kerk in Galle, during the administration of Adam van der Duyn, the Commandeur of Jaffnapatnam. The architect and builder was Martinus Leusekam, who is described as a Baas Landmeter (Chief Surveyor) and the resident Predikant was Philippus de Vries.

In September 1795 Jaffna fell to British forces. The church was then used as place of worship by the British garrison. The church gradually lost its congregation and in 1872 when the British began using their own church in the centre of Jaffna (1.5 km (0.93 mi) away), it was abandoned.

When the Liberation Tigers of Tamil Eelam occupied the fort during the Sri Lankan Civil War the church, along with a number of other key buildings, were demolished in an attempt to stop the Sri Lankan Army gaining control of the site. Currently only the remains of the walls remain. Fortunately a number of the historic tombstones were rescued and are currently housed at the church in Batticaloa for safekeeping.

== Architecture ==
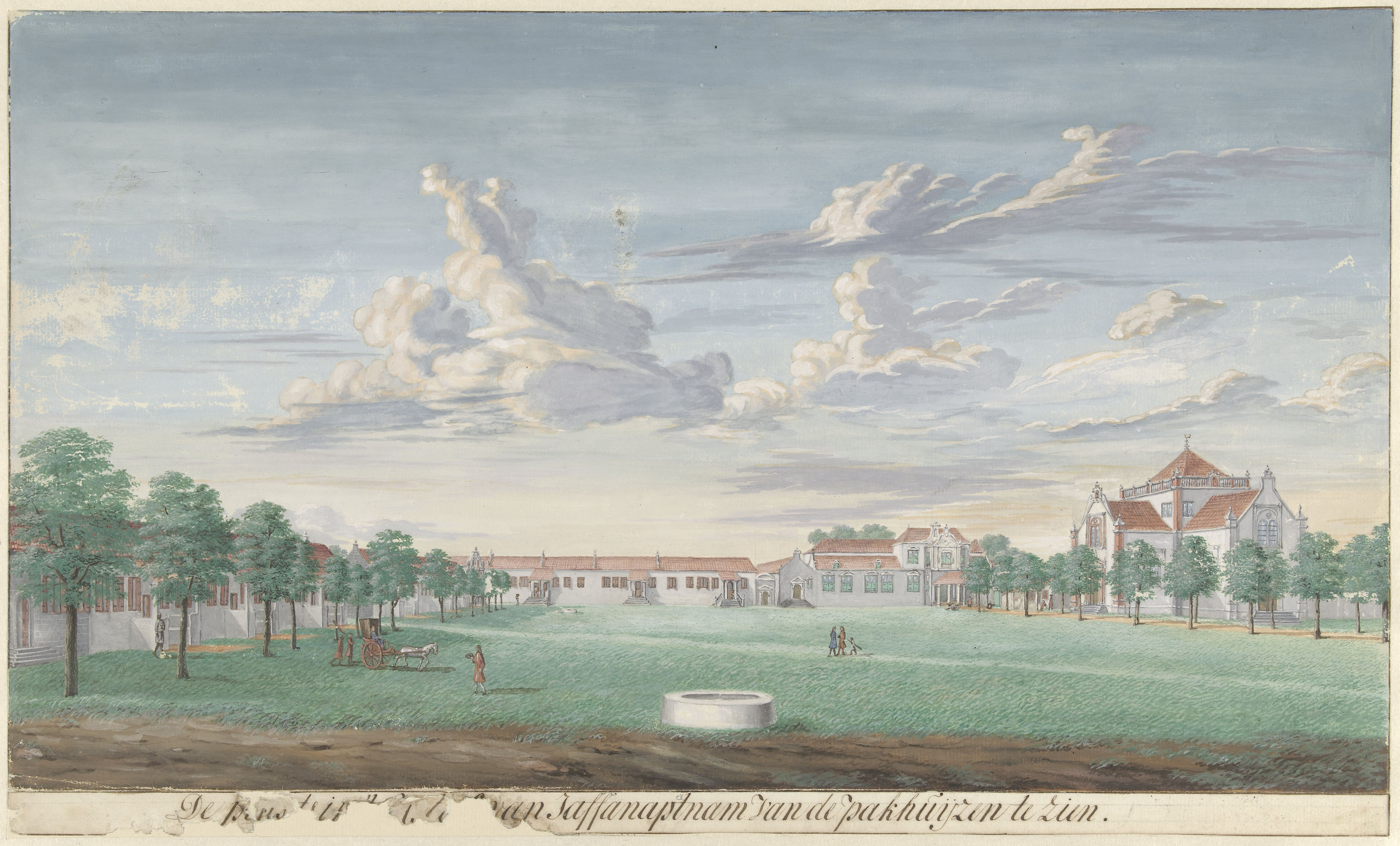
The Kruys Church within Jaffna fort.

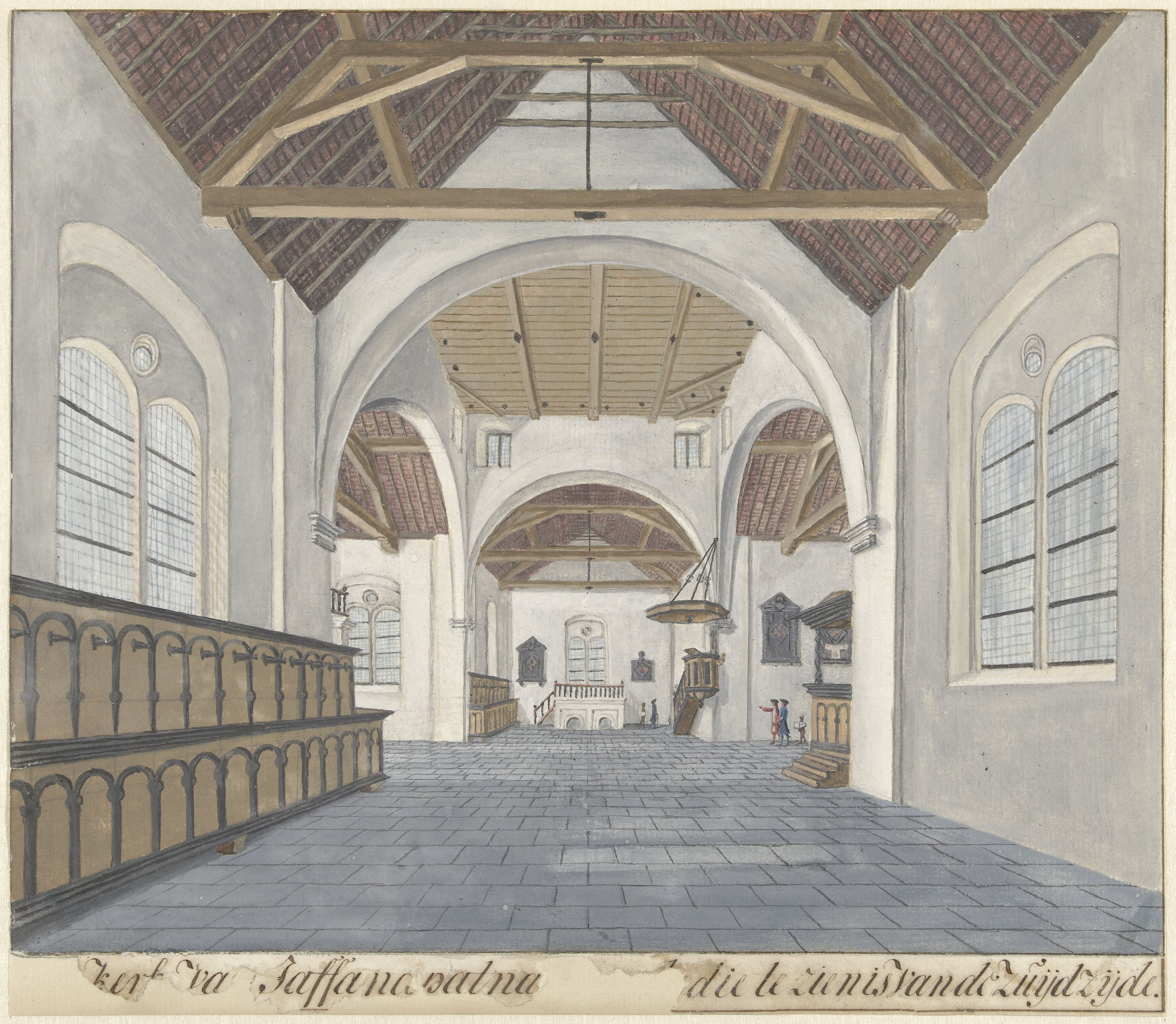
Drawing of the interior of the church.

The church was in the form of a Greek Cross, with arms of equal length and a wide central area. The walls were four to five feet thick, built out of rubble and coral stone, with a covering of cement. The pillars, arches and pediments of the doorways were built with imported Dutch bricks. The floor was paved with stones 2 sq ft (0.19 m^{2}) in area, with a number of tombstones, dating from 1660, suggesting that they contained re-interred ashes or remains. The ends of the church's naves were gabled. The windows contained multiple panes and were heavily mullioned.

The church could accommodate up to 600 worshippers.
