= Kalpitiya Fort =

Fort in Sri Lanka

- Part of Puttalam
- Kalpitiya, Sri Lanka
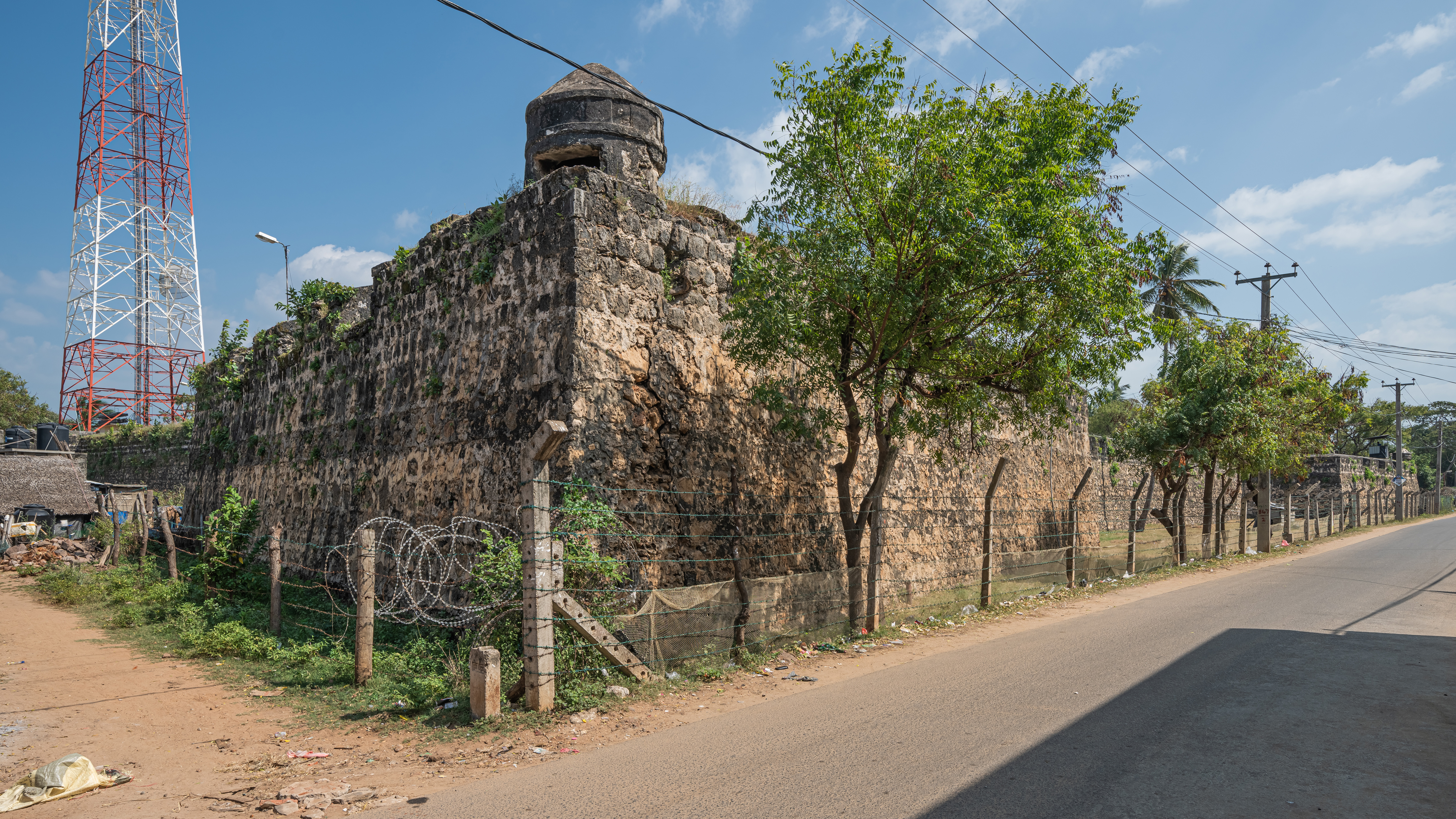
- Kalpitiya fort (West side)

Site information
- Type: Defence fort
- Controlled by: Government of Sri Lanka
- Open to the public: yes
- Condition: good

Location
- Sri Lanka
- Location within Sri Lanka
- Coordinates: 8°14′8″N 79°45′58″E
- Height: 4 m (13 ft)

Site history
- Built: 1667-1676
- Built by: Dutch
- Materials: limestone and coral

Kalpitiya Fort (Sinhala: කල්පිටිය බලකොටුව Kalpitiya Balakotuwa; Tamil: கற்பிட்டிக் கோட்டை, romanized: Kaṟpiṭṭik Kōṭṭai) was built by the Dutch between 1667 and 1676. Kalpitiya was important as it commands the entrance to the adjacent bay, Puttalam Lagoon. The surrounding Puttalam area was one of the major cinnamon cultivation areas in Sri Lanka. The Dutch even constructed a canal from Puttalam via Negombo to Colombo to transport cinnamon from the area.

== History ==
Kalpitiya was known by the ancient Tamils as Kav Putti and was a popular hub for Arab merchants. In 1544 the Portuguese invaded the area, naming the area Kardiv Island. The King of Portugal bestowing the territory to the Jesuits, who built a chapel here, established a small garrison to defend it. In an effort to free the port from the Portuguese the King of Kandy, King Rasjasinha II, sought assistance from the Dutch, who in 1659 conquered the area but did not return it to the King. Instead, they commenced construction of a fort in 1667, which was completed in 1676. Kalpitiya was strategically important for the Dutch East India Company (VOC), as it enabled them to control the external trade of the Kingdom of Kandy, by controlling the large Muslim trading community in the area.

The fort is nearly square in shape, with walls about 4 m (13 ft) high, constructed out of coral and limestone from the surrounding area. It has a single entrance, which fronts the lagoon, which has a pediment, with a belfry above and looks like the entrance to a church.

The yellow bricks that comprise the entrance arch were reportedly brought especially from Holland. The story is that the King of Kandy had granted permission only to build a church here and that the Dutch had built the arch to mislead the King into believing that this was simply a fortified church.

Kalpitiya Fort has four bastions on each corner, each with its own guard post, with two smaller bastions facing the lagoon. Inside, the buildings are located around the periphery creating an empty space in the middle of the fort. The walls of a chapel, barracks, dining hall, commander's residence and prison are still evident, though the roofs have been replaced. There were two tunnels leading away from the fort — one led to the sea and the other to the Dutch Reformed Church approximately 400 m (1,300 ft) outside the fort. These tunnels are blocked and are inaccessible.

In 1795 the fort was surrendered to the British. The British continued with their military occupation of the Kalpitiya Fort till 1859.

Kalpitiya fort was neglected for many years until it was turned into a Sri Lankan Navy base for training and operational activity during the escalation of the Sri Lankan Civil War. The ramparts are in good condition today.

== See also ==
- Forts of Sri Lanka
