= Dutch Reformed Church, Kalpitiya =

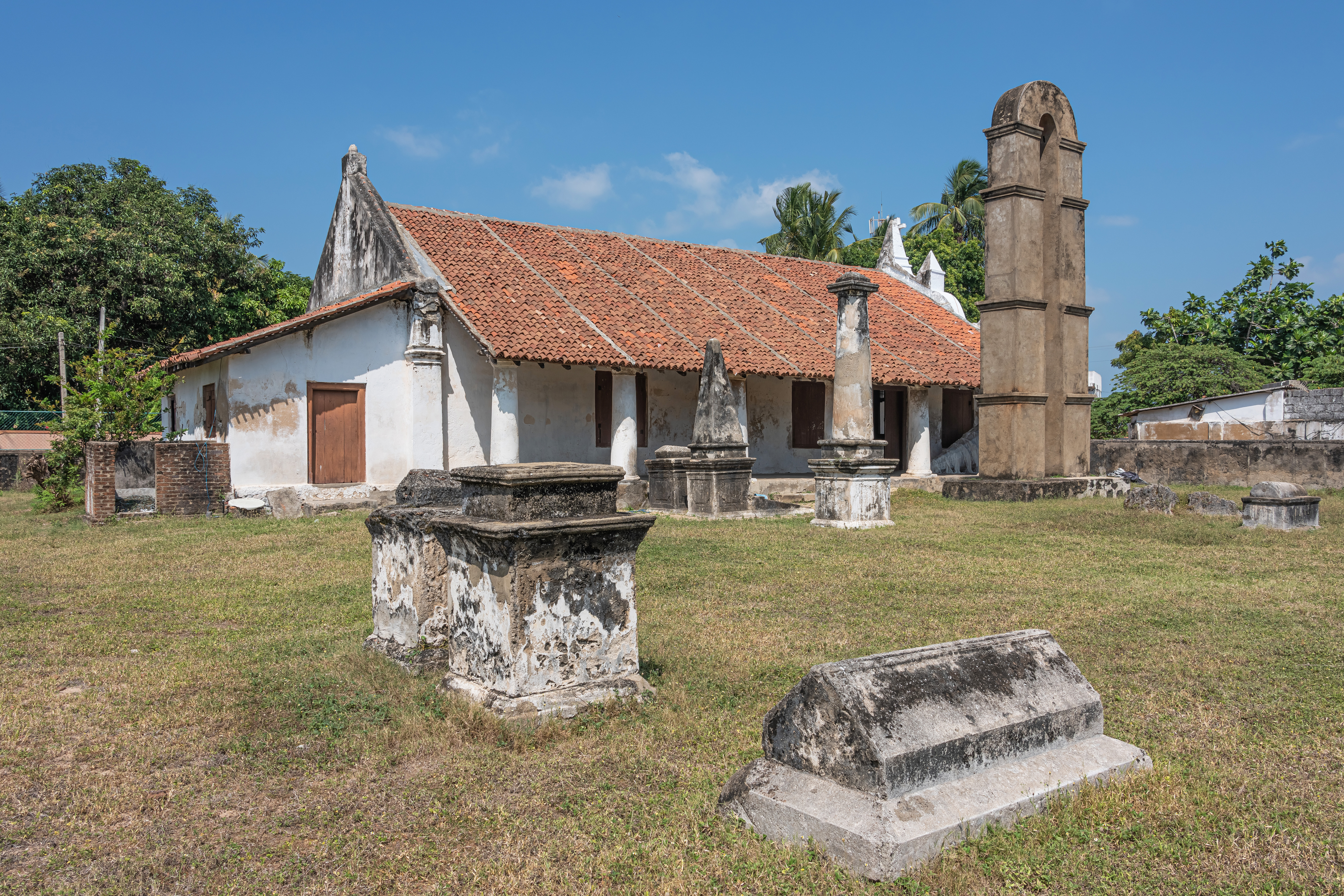

Religion
- Affiliation: Protestant / Christian Reformed Church
- Year consecrated: 1706

Location
- Location: Kalpitiya, Sri Lanka
- Interactive map of Dutch Reformed Church, Kalpitiya

Architecture
- Type: Church
- Style: Doric

Website
- www.wolvendaal.org

The Dutch Reformed Church (also known as St Peter's Kerk) is located between the Dutch fort and the village of Kalpitiya. The church was built by the Dutch in 1706 and is a smaller version of the church in the Matara fort. It is one of the oldest Protestant churches in the country.

== History ==
Kalpitiya was originally known by the ancient Tamils as Kav Putti, and was a popular hub for Arab merchants. In the early 16th century the Portuguese invaded the area, naming the area Kardiv Island. The King of Portugal bestowing the territory to the Jesuits, who built a chapel here, establishing a small garrison to defend it. In an effort to free the port from the Portuguese the King of Kandy, King Rasjasinha II, sought assistance from the Dutch, who in 1659 conquered the area but did not return it to the King, instead they commenced construction of a fort in 1667, which was completed in 1676. Kalpitiya was strategically important for the Dutch East India Company (VOC), as it enabled them to control the external trade of the Kingdom of Kandy, by controlling the large Muslim trading community in the area.

The Dutch called the town Calpentyn or Calpetty, occupying the fort there until the end of the 18th century. They also built a small church, with a similar character to the church in Matara. When the British invaded Ceylon, the Dutch soldiers and officials were recalled to Colombo, as a result the British found the fort empty except for a Dutch administrative officer, who promptly surrendered the fort to them. In the beginning of the 1800s when most of the Dutch left the island services at the church stopped. The church was subsequently used by Anglican missionaries.

The building was renovated around 1840, when a semi-circular porch with brick and plaster pillars with Corinthian capitals was added, together with three spires on its front gable. The roof of the church has since collapsed. The belfry is original and is similar to the ones found in Galle and Colombo. Around the turn of the century the bell from the belfry, along with all the furniture from the church, was removed to an Anglican church in Puttalam. The original Dutch tombstones can still be found on the church's floor.

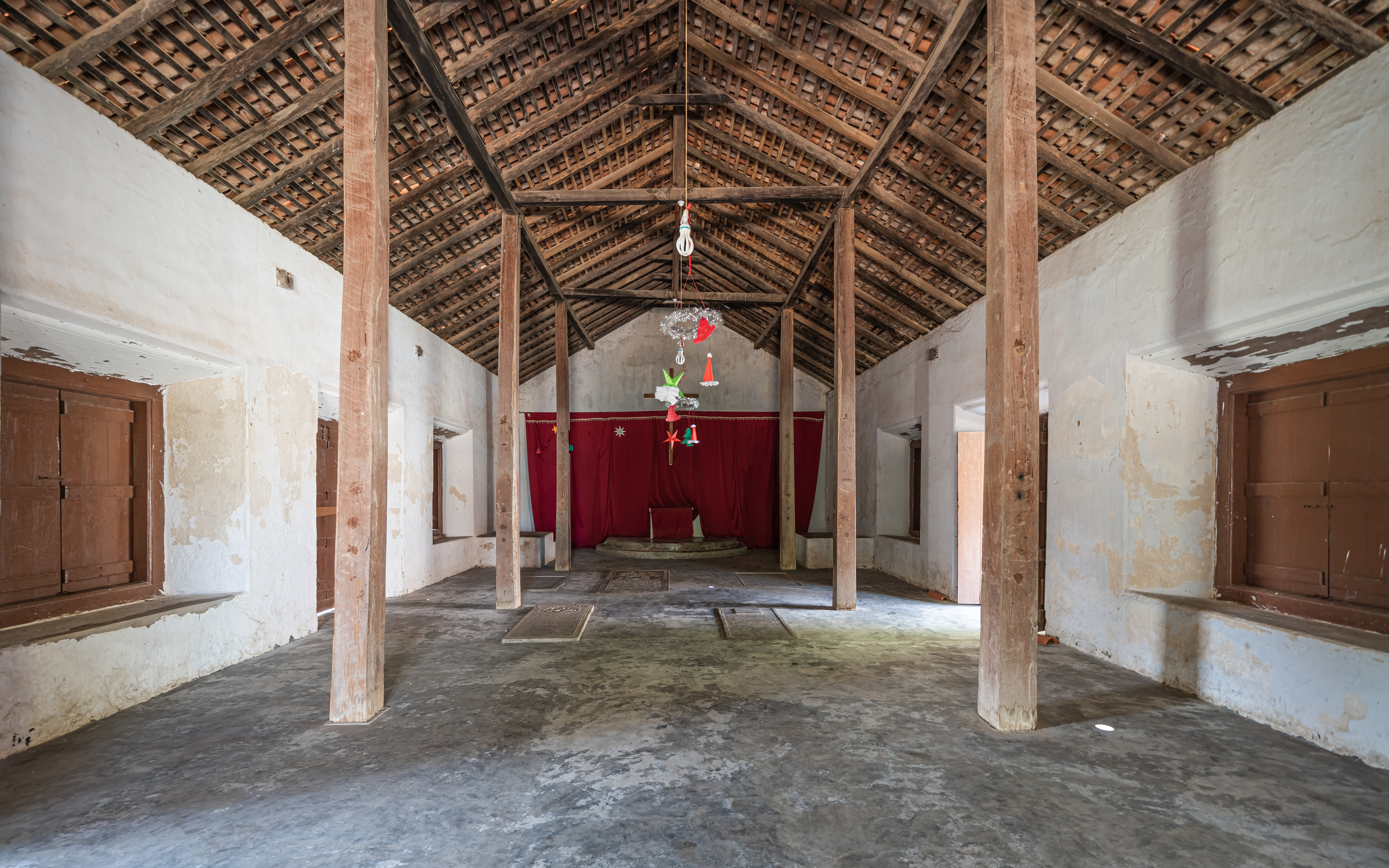
Interior of the church

For a long time the church fell under the management of the Archaeological Department of Sri Lanka. In December 2010 formal ownership of the church was returned to the Dutch Reformed Church (DRC). Renovation of the building is proposed to be undertaken as part of the religious and cultural development of Kalpitiya.
