= Lanka Reformed Church =

Sri Lankan church

The Lanka Reformed Church was formed in 1996, and separated from the Christian Reformed Church in Sri Lanka, formerly the Dutch Reformed Church in Sri Lanka. It has ecclesiastical contacts with the Reformed Churches in the Netherlands (Liberated) and the Evangelical Presbyterian Church in Australia. Lanka Reformed Church is composed of a single congregation.
