= Kalpitiya =

- Town
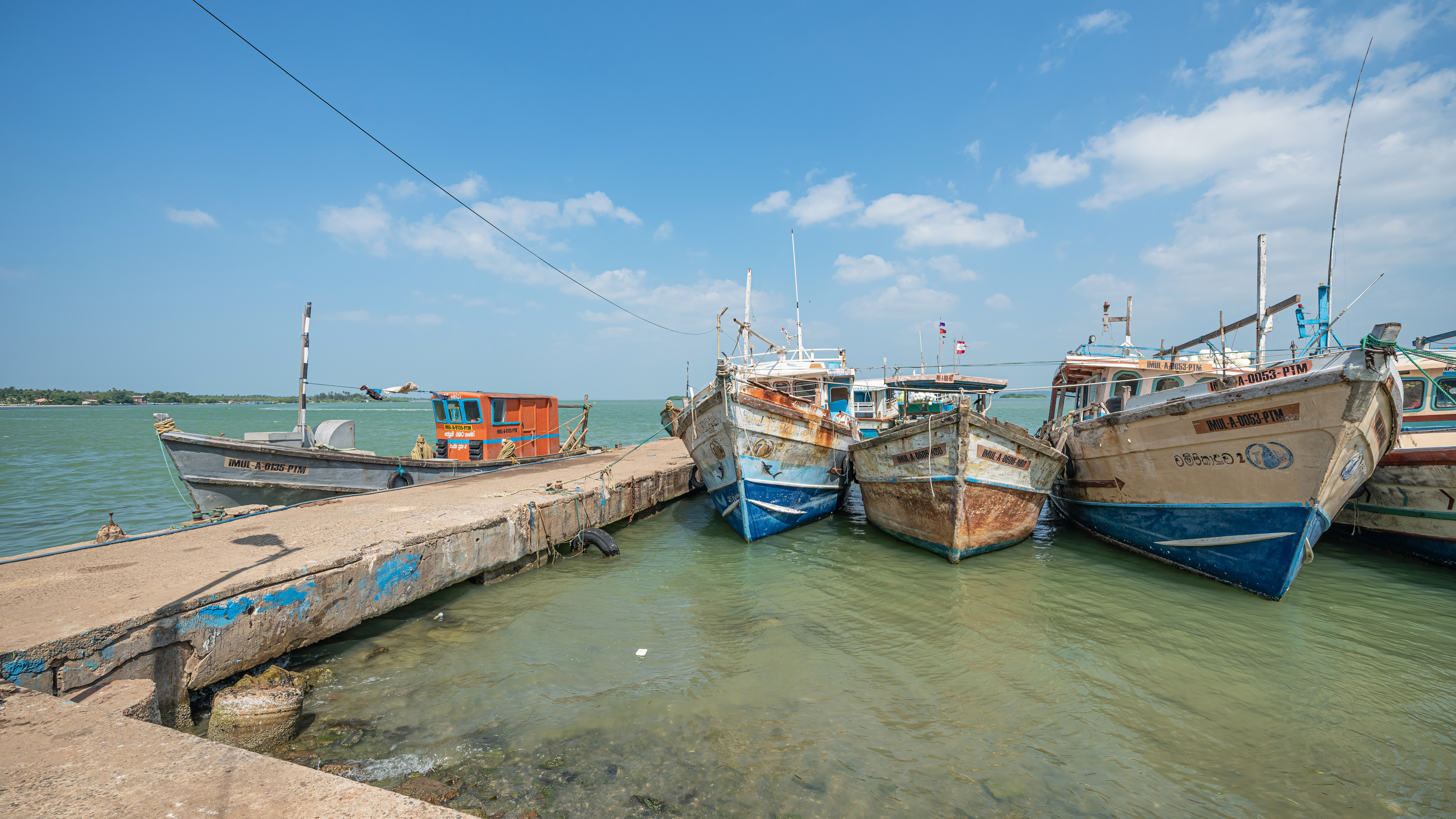
- Fishery harbour in Kalpitiya

- Location within Sri Lanka
- Coordinates: 08°10′0″N 79°43′0″E
- Country: Sri Lanka
- Province: North Western
- District: Puttalam District
- Division: Kalpitiya Division

Government
  - Type: Kalpitiya Pradeshiya Sabah
  - Chairman: A. M. Infas
  - Vice Chairman: K. S. Vijitha Fernando

Area
  - Total: 167.0 km^{2} (64.5 sq mi)

Population (2012)
  - Total: 86,405
  - Metro density: 517.4/km^{2} (1,340/sq mi)
- Time zone: UTC+05:30 (Sri Lanka Standard Time Zone)

Kalpitiya (Sinhala: කල්පිටිය, romanized: Kalpiṭiya, Tamil: கற்பிட்டி, romanized: Kaṟpiṭṭi) is a coastal town located in western region of Puttalam District. The Kalpitiya peninsula consists of a total fourteen islands. It is developing as a tourist destination.

== Etymology ==
Scholars identify the Sinhalese name "Kalapiti-Kuli which is mentioned in Sigiri graffiti as modern Kalpitiya" According to another theory, Kalpitiya is derived from the Tamil name Kalputti, stemming from the words kal meaning stone and putti meaning elevation. The place was in ancient times also known as Arasadi, meaning in Tamil "place of Arasa tree". The place was in colonial era known as Calpentyn.

== History ==
Records going far back reveal that the peninsula was associated with maritime trade and smuggling escapades since ancient times. It was first colonised by the Portuguese in early 17th Century. The arrival of the Dutch eventually resulted in the ousting of the Portuguese from here and elsewhere in the island. Historical records show that during the Dutch period of the island's colonial history, the northern end of the peninsula was used as a strategic base for a military garrison and naval outpost to monopolise trade supplies to the mainland. A well preserved Dutch-era fort (incorporating an earlier Portuguese-era church) occupied by the Sri Lanka Navy, and a Dutch church remain today. Nearby at Talawila to the south, a vibrant annual festival keeps alive its Portuguese heritage, at the ancient St Anne's church festival, when thousands of Catholic devotees descend upon the tiny village to celebrate St Anne's Day on July 26.

== Climate ==
Kalpitiya is located at the boarder of dry zone. Thanks to that it is still nicely green but has much less rain that the south of Sri Lanka. Usually the only rainy month is November, but it rarely rains whole the day. The best beach season is from December to April, which is also the best time for any marine activities like scuba diving, snorkelling or dolphin watching because the ocean is calm and waves are smallest. From May to September there is more wind which is mostly appreciated by kitesurfers and it also cools down the area.

== Demographics ==
Kalpitiya is a multi-ethnic and multi-cultural town, majority of Kalpitiya residents are Muslims, while Sinhalese are second largest in the town. Other small groups; Sri Lankan Tamils, Indian Tamils, Burgher and Malay also living in the town.

=== Ethnicity ===
Ethnicity in Kalpitiya DS Division
| Population | Percent |
| Muslims | 53.67% |
| Sinhalese | 31.29% |
| Sri Lankan Tamils | 12.90% |
| Indian Tamils | 0.49% |
| Others | 1.64% |

Source:statistics.gov.lk

Kalpitiya is a multi-religious town. The major religion in Kalpitiya is Islam, while Christianity being the second largest religion in the town. The town is also home to other religious faiths include; Buddhism and Hinduism.

=== Religion ===
Religion in Kalpitiya DS Division
| Population | Percent |
| Islam | 54.60% |
| Christianity | 33.19% |
| Buddhism | 6.42% |
| Hinduism | 4.58% |
| Others | 1.21% |

Source:statistics.gov.lk

== Education ==
- Al Aqsa National School

There are local government schools which offer education for thousands of children. There are also several international schools like IKRA which offer elementary and secondary education in English to local or foreign children.

== Tourism industry ==
It is now developing as a tourist destination. It has a marine sanctuary with a diversity of habitats ranging from bar reefs, flat coastal plains, saltpans, mangroves swamps, salt marshes and vast sand dune beaches. It provides nursing grounds for many species of fish and crustaceans. The coastal waters are also home to spinner, bottlenose and Indo-Pacific humpback dolphins, whales, sea turtles, and the elusive dugong. The Sri Lankan government has now formulated a master plan for the development of tourism industry here.

Alankuda is a stretch of beach in Kalpitiya that is home to a number of beach hotels. The beach is a starting point for off-shore whale and dolphin watching in Kalpitiya and offers various water related activities which are available from November till the end of April. Alankuda is home to megapods (groups of more than one thousand) of dolphins. Hotels and resorts here include Bar Reef Resort, Palagama Beach, Khomba House, Udekki, Dune Towers and Dolphin Beach Resort.

=== Kitesurfing ===
Kalpitiya is known as being the best location for kitesurfing in the country. The summer kitesurfing season is from May to October during the south west monsoon while the winter season is from mid December to mid February during the north east monsoon. Kiteboard Tour Asia held a tour event in Kalpitiya in September 2017.

=== Scuba Diving ===
Indian Ocean around Kalpitiya peninsula is famous for the abundant marine life. There are more than 20 world class dive sites of depths ranging from 12–20 meters accessible by boat from the shore. The dive sites offer both rocky and sandy bottoms which are home to many kinds of sting rays, moray eels, soft and hard coral, napoleon wrasse, shrimps, nudibranch, barracuda, and fish schools.

=== Islands of Kalpitiya ===
| No | Name of Island | Area |
|---|---|---|
| 1 | Battalangunduwa | 145.53 ha |
| 2 | Palliyawatta | 60.89 ha |
| 3 | Vellai I | 1.55 ha |
| 4 | Vellai II | 10.80 ha |
| 5 | Vellai III | 13.70 ha |
| 6 | Uchchamunai | 449.30 ha |
| 7 | Ippantivu | 76.88 ha |
| 8 | Periya Arichchalai | 45.60 ha |
| 9 | Sinna Arichchalai | 16.82 |
| 10 | Eramutivu | 101.52 ha |
| 11 | Sinna Eramutivu | 2.22 ha |
| 12 | Eramutivu West | 4.53 ha |
| 13 | Kakativu | 4.53 ha |
| 14 | Mutwal(Dutch Bay) | 715.14 ha |

== Allegations of land grab ==
The area is one of the 15 sites for the country’s Tourism Development Strategy which was formulated as early as 2003. Acquisition of some 4,000 acres (1,600 ha) of land for the project has begun as early as in 2004 pursuant to a Cabinet decision. Since 2003, around 1,000 acres (400 ha) of lands which amounts to about 25 per cent of the Kalpitiya islands' total land area have been grabbed in various ways and means from at least 2500 families. Already 16 resorts or hotels and access roads are proposed for construction in the area.

Post-tsunami (2005 onwards), those in the tourism business acquired damaged coastal areas at low prices around the country. Again in 2009, in the post-war period, investors in the tourism industry scrambled to ‘acquire’ potential business sites to capitalise on the reconstruction phase.

Land seizures have also occurred by scrupulously removing the names of the residents from government documents such as the voters’ registry, abusing legal ownership regulations and stipulations of the government and ignoring provisions in the customary law, using coercive means upon the residents who are unable to produce titles to the land they have been occupying and by taking over Beach Seine points and anchorage points by force.

== Gallery ==
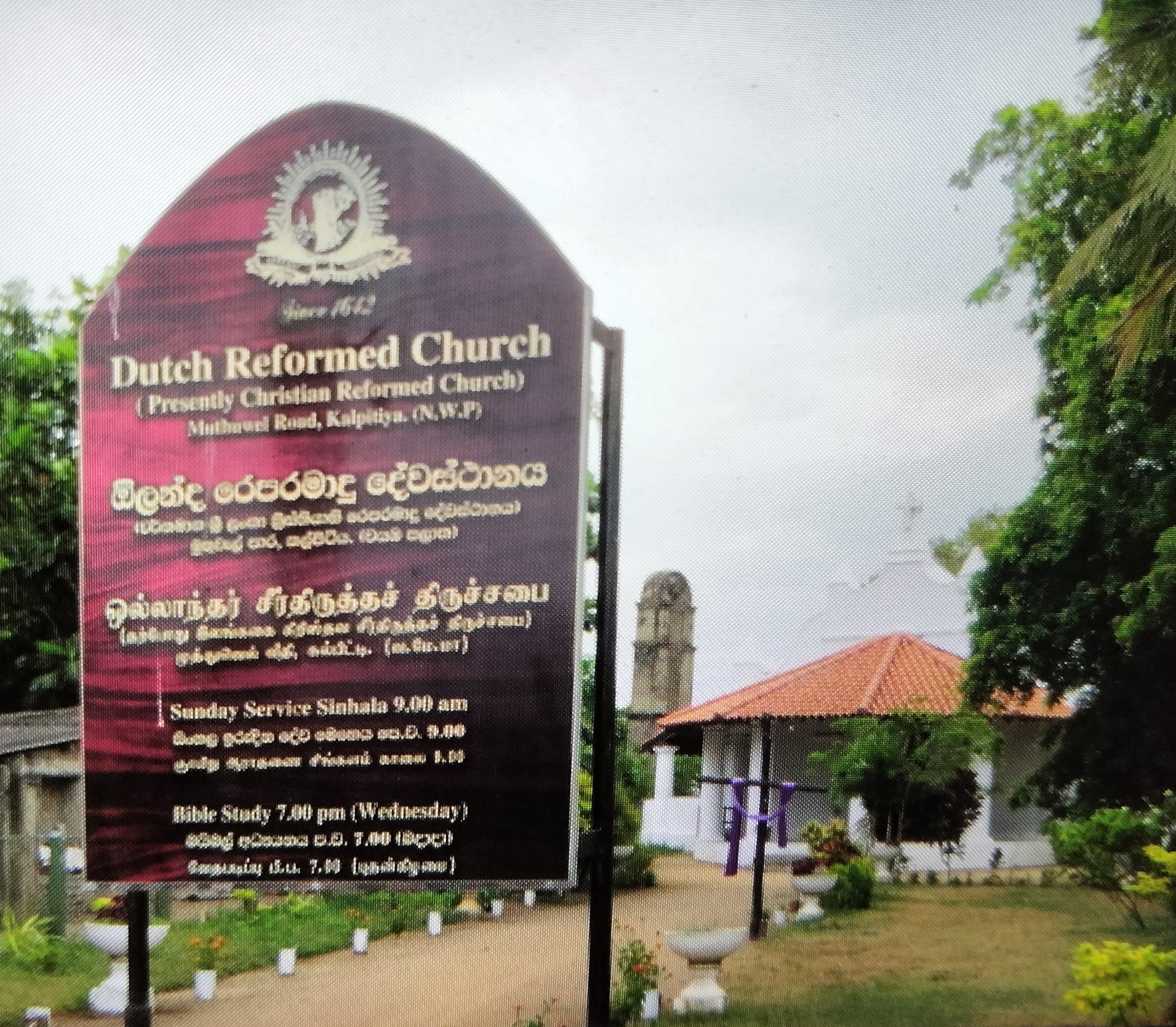
Dutch Reformed Church

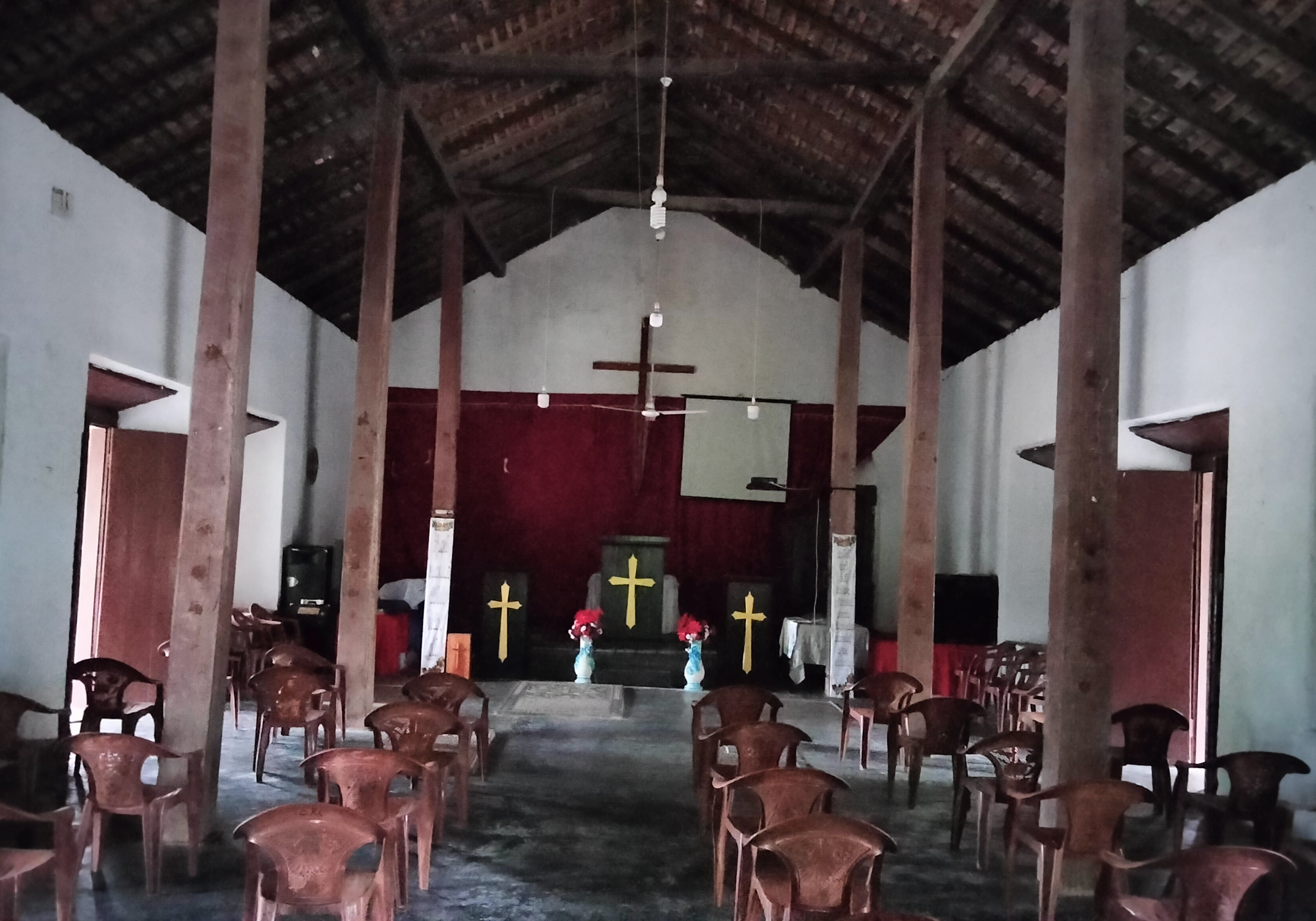
Dutch Reformed Church

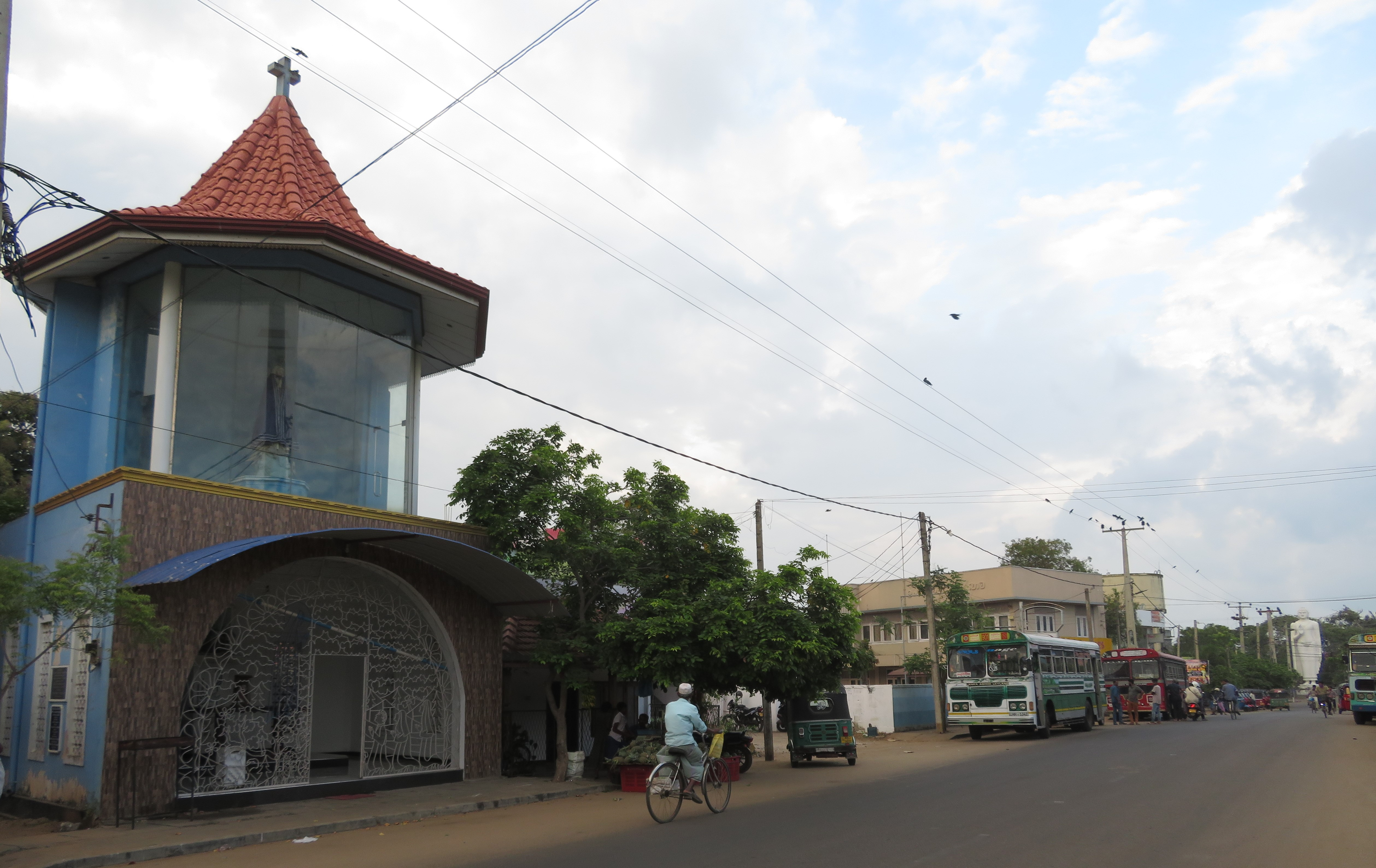
Main street

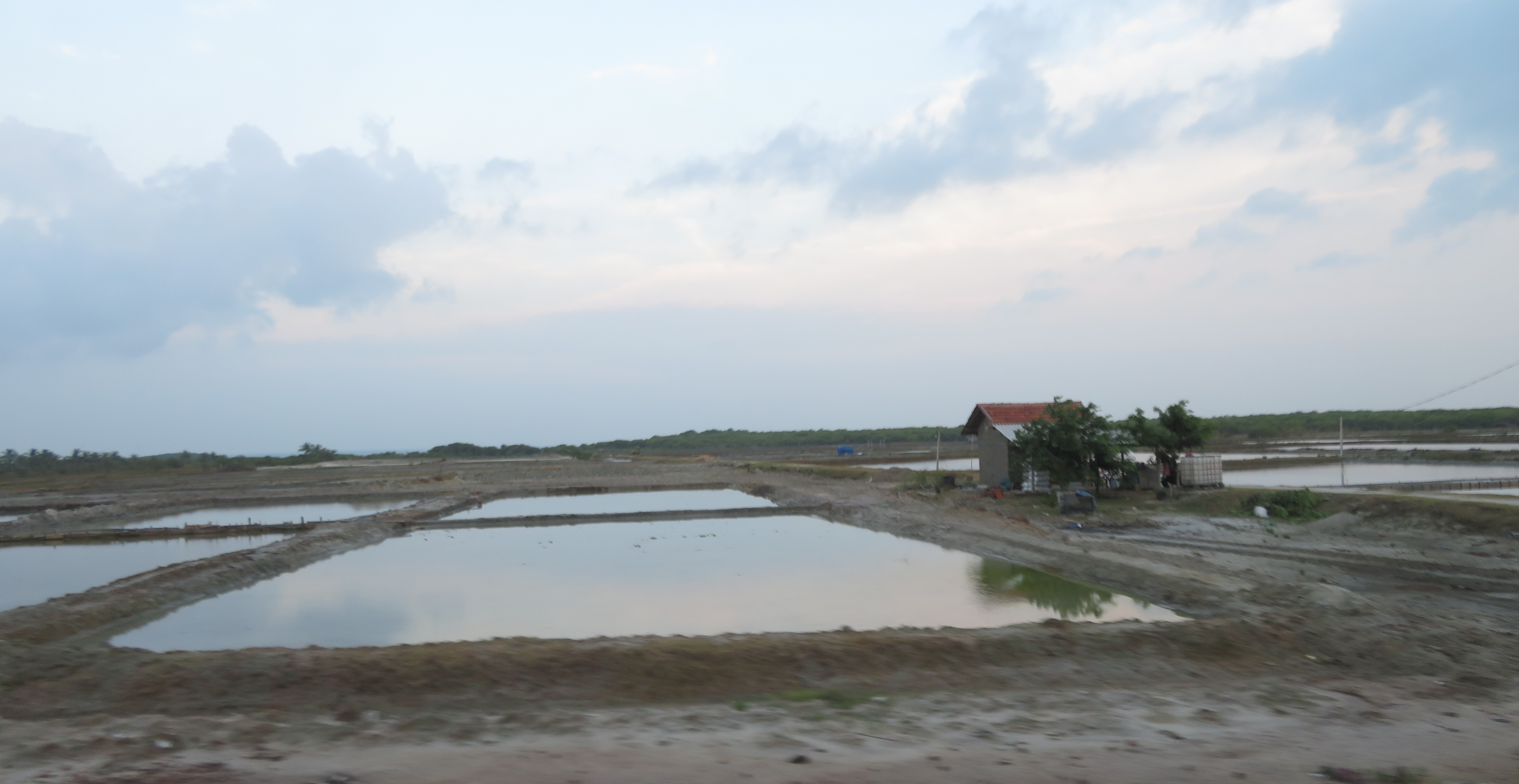
Production of salt through evaporisation of sea water near Kalpitiya
