= King's House =

King's House or Kings House may mean:

- Carcosa Seri Negara, the former official residence for British High Commissioners in Malaya in Kuala Lumpur, Malaysia
- King's House, Brussels, a historic building on the Grand-Place/Grote Markt, housing the Brussels City Museum
- Kings House, Hove, a Grade II listed 19th-century house in Hove, East Sussex, England
- Kings House Hotel, a remote inn and hotel at the eastern end of Glen Coe, in the Scottish Highlands
- King's House, Jamaica, the official residence of the Governor General of Jamaica
- King's House School, an independent day preparatory school in Richmond, England
- King's House, Slaidburn, a youth hostel in Slaidburn, Lancashire, England
- King's House, Winchester, a late 17th-century planned royal palace in the English county of Hampshire
- Königshaus am Schachen, a small castle in Schachen Witterstein, Bavaria, Germany
