= Queen's House, Jaffna =

Queen's House

General information
- Location: Jaffna, Sri Lanka
- Client: Government of Sri Lanka

Queen's House was a former official residence of the President of Sri Lanka in Jaffna. A former Governor's residence during the colonial period, it was used by the Governor General of Ceylon until Sri Lanka became a republic. It was used by Presidents William Gopallawa and J. R. Jayewardene when visiting Jaffna. It was built in the 17th century as the residence of the commander of the colonial garrison of the fort. Situated within the Jaffna fort, it was damaged to a great extent during the course of the Sri Lankan Civil War and is currently under renovation.

== See also ==
- Queen's Cottage
