= Dutch Reformed Church, Matara =

Church building in Sri Lanka

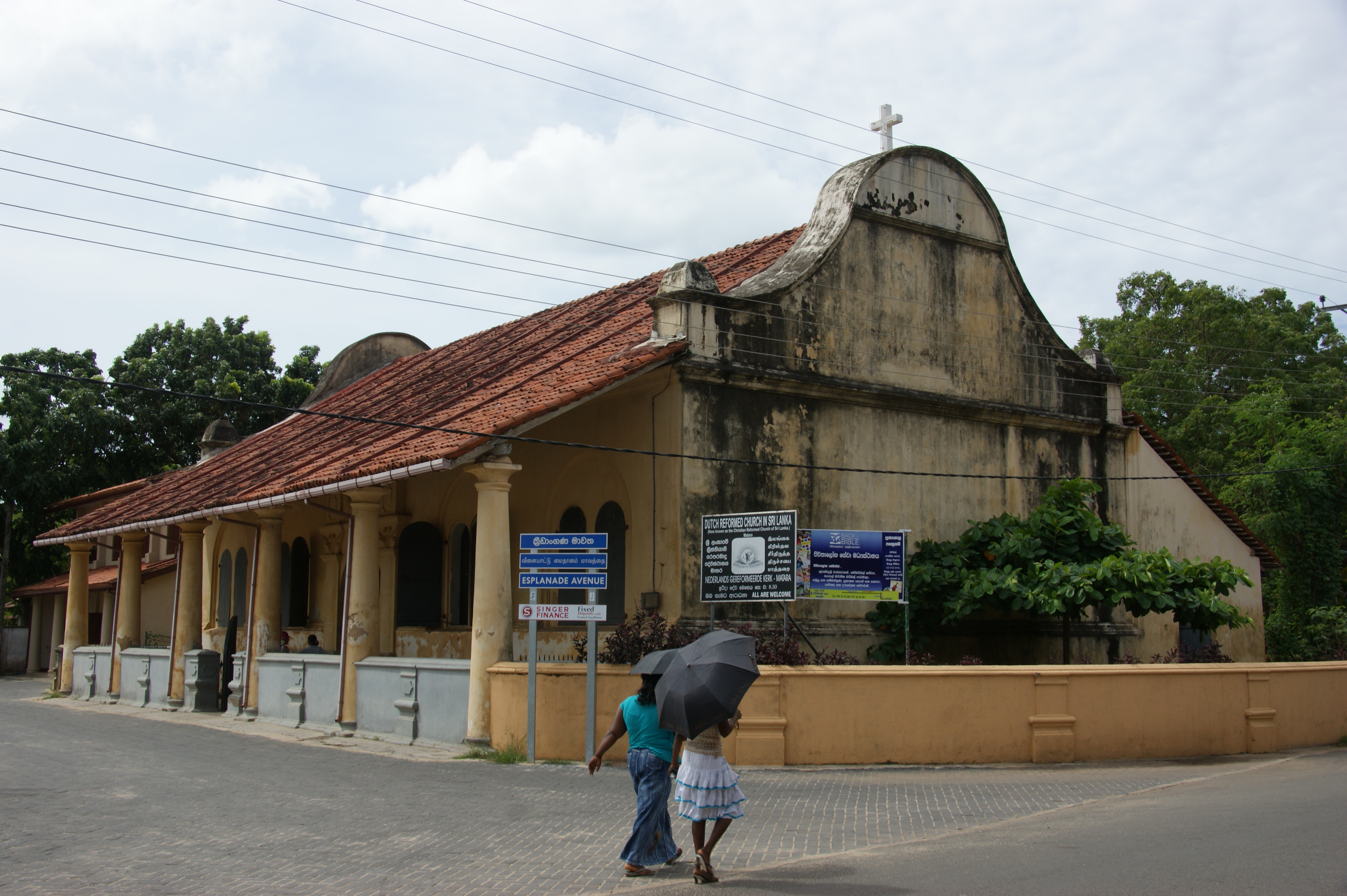
- Church exterior

Religion
- Affiliation: Protestant / Christian Reformed Church
- Year consecrated: 1706
- Status: Active

Location
- Location: Matara, Sri Lanka
- Interactive map of Dutch Reformed Church, Matara
- Coordinates: 5°56′41″N 80°32′48″E

Architecture
- Type: Church
- Style: Doric
- Completed: 1706

Website
- www.wolvendaal.org

The Dutch Reformed Church is located within the Matara fort in Matara and is situated near the entrance to the fort. The church was built by the Dutch in 1706 and is a smaller version of the church in Galle fort. It is one of the oldest Protestant churches still in use in the country.

== History ==
The church was consecrated on 6 October 1706, according to an inscription over the doorway. During subsequent repairs and improvements this date has been obliterated and another date, that of 1767 was etched above the entrance. This date however refers to the reconstruction of the church by the Dutch following the Matara Rebellion. The Dessave (Dutch: opperkoopman) at that time was Daniel Burnat. The church may have existed prior to 1706. There is evidence of greater antiquity in the gravestones, which pave the floor of the church. The oldest of the gravestones is of Barbara Jongeling, the wife of Lambert Lambertijn, the medical officer of the station in 1686. Other gravestones include, Dessaves Frans Willem Falck, father of Governor Iman Willem Falck, and Johannes Fernandinus Crijtsman, in 1737 and 1758, respectively.

The Church was primarily for the Dutch but the first Sinhala sermon was held when a Church service was organised for the housemaids of the Dutch community who brought them to the Church and stayed on the verandah until the service was over.

== Architecture ==
The church's façade and the interior are very simple and plain, in keeping with the church's Calvinist heritage. The building has round headed windows on each side, a pillared verandah on the south side, with the entrance in the middle. It is an elegant but unpretentious building sufficient to hold 200 seats. The door and window panels are made of heavy wood while the walls now show signs of crumbling as the proper mixture to rebuild them could not be found within Sri Lanka.

== Current use ==
The Matara Church, protected by the sturdy walls of the fort, was slightly damaged by the tsunami caused by the 2004 Indian Ocean earthquake. The building did not suffer structural damage but the majority of the antique furniture was destroyed. The Evangelist of the Church, with the assistance of the Dutch Reformed Church (DRC), turned the building into a food distribution centre for the suffering population. Church services were subsequently resumed despite the damage. The church has been restored by the Wolvendaal Foundation in cooperation with the Archaeological Department of Sri Lanka.

In January 2005 the Dutch Reformed Church established the Wolvendaal Foundation. Its ultimate aim is to further cordial relations between the various races and religions on the island.

In October 2006 the Wolvendaal Foundation, with the financial assistance (Rs. 6.5M) from the Dutch Government appointed Poly-Chem Lanka (Pvt) Ltd, Colombo to undertake the restoration of the church. The renovation works were completed within 2 years, the works included restoring the roof, repairing and painting the walls, equalising the floor and re-installing the historic Dutch tombstones into their original position. The antique pulpit and pews were also renovated. The Archaeological Department of Sri Lanka has subsequently made further improvements to the roof.

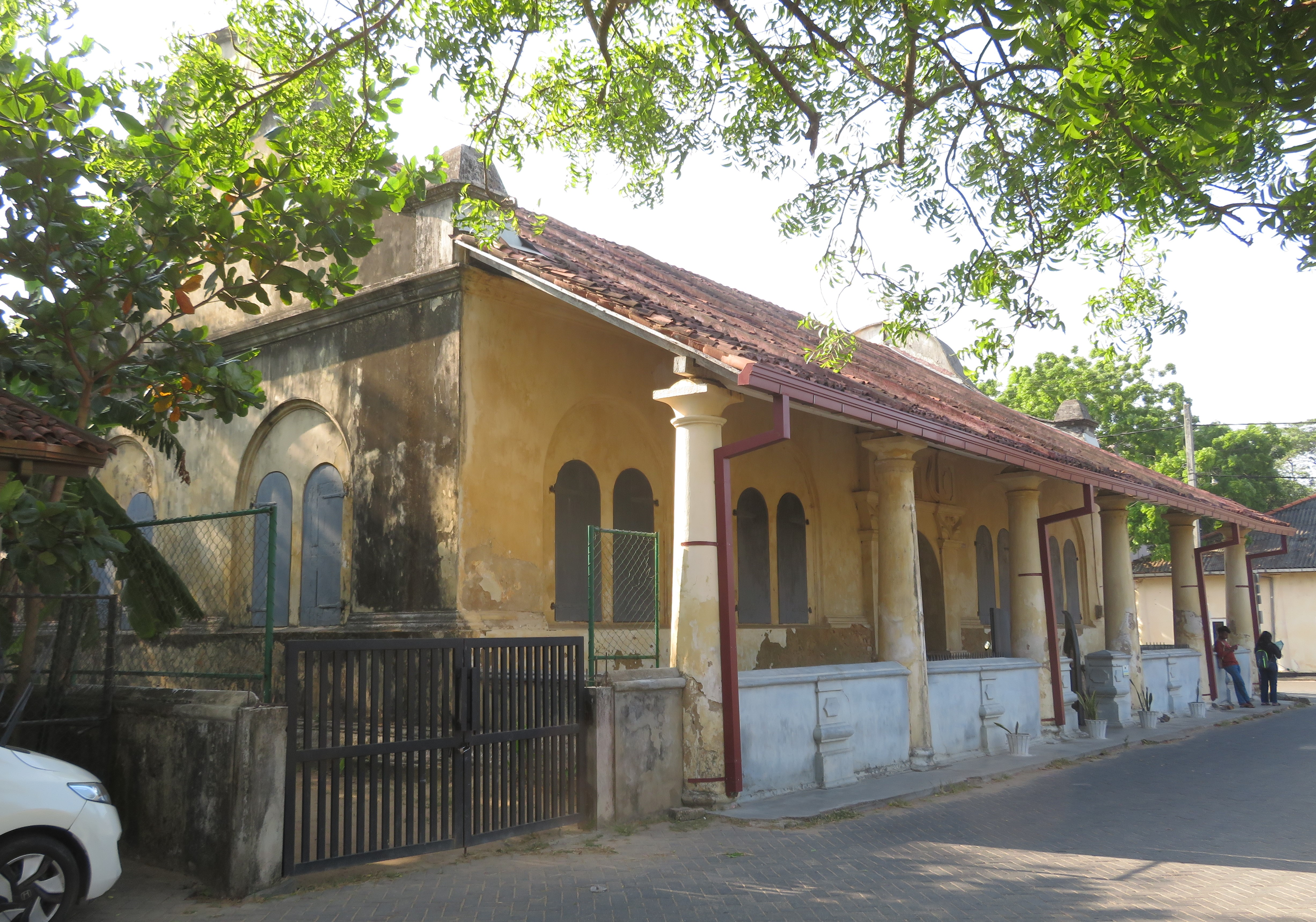
Dutch Reformed Church

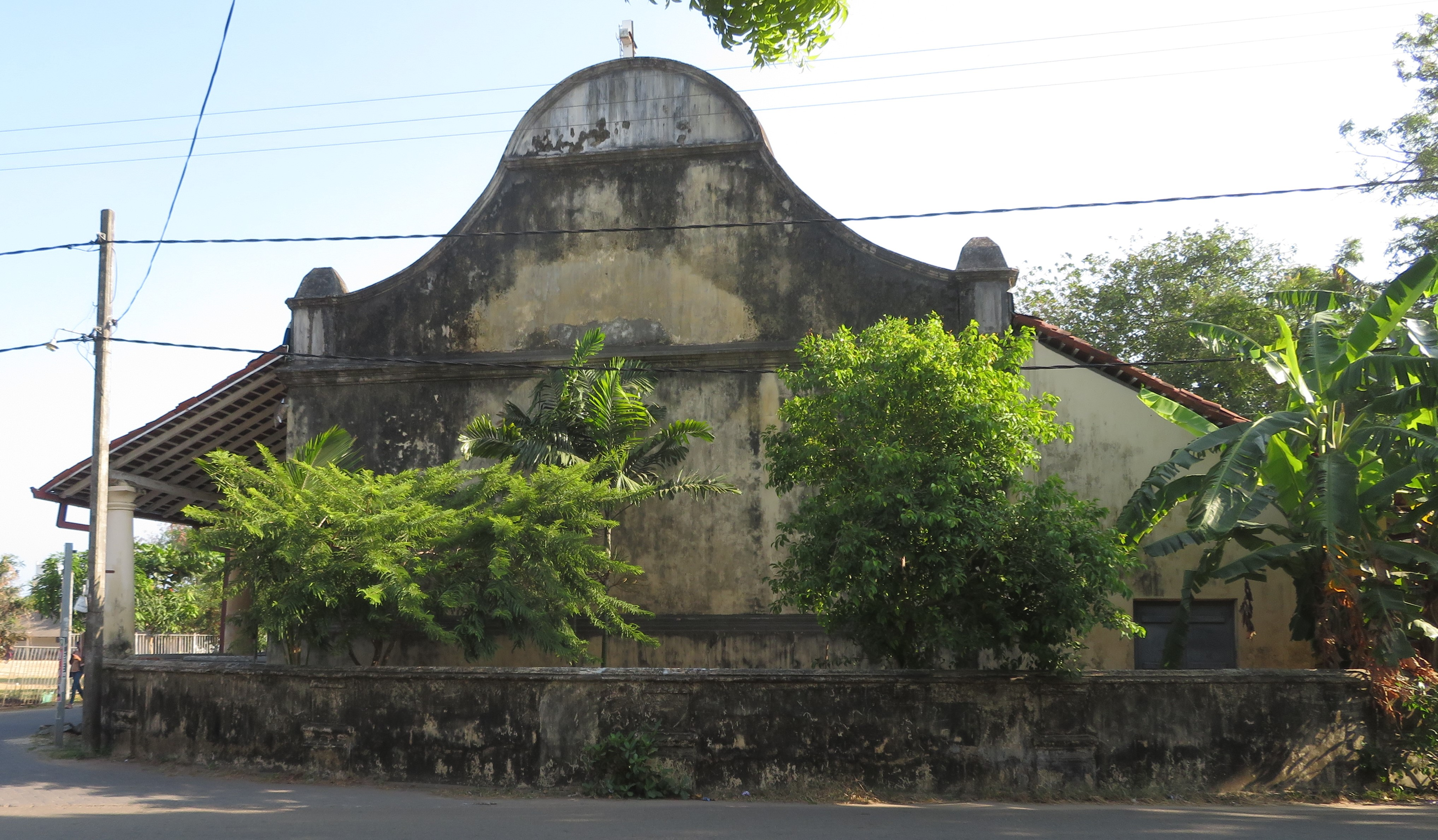
Dutch Reformed Church, northern façade 2024

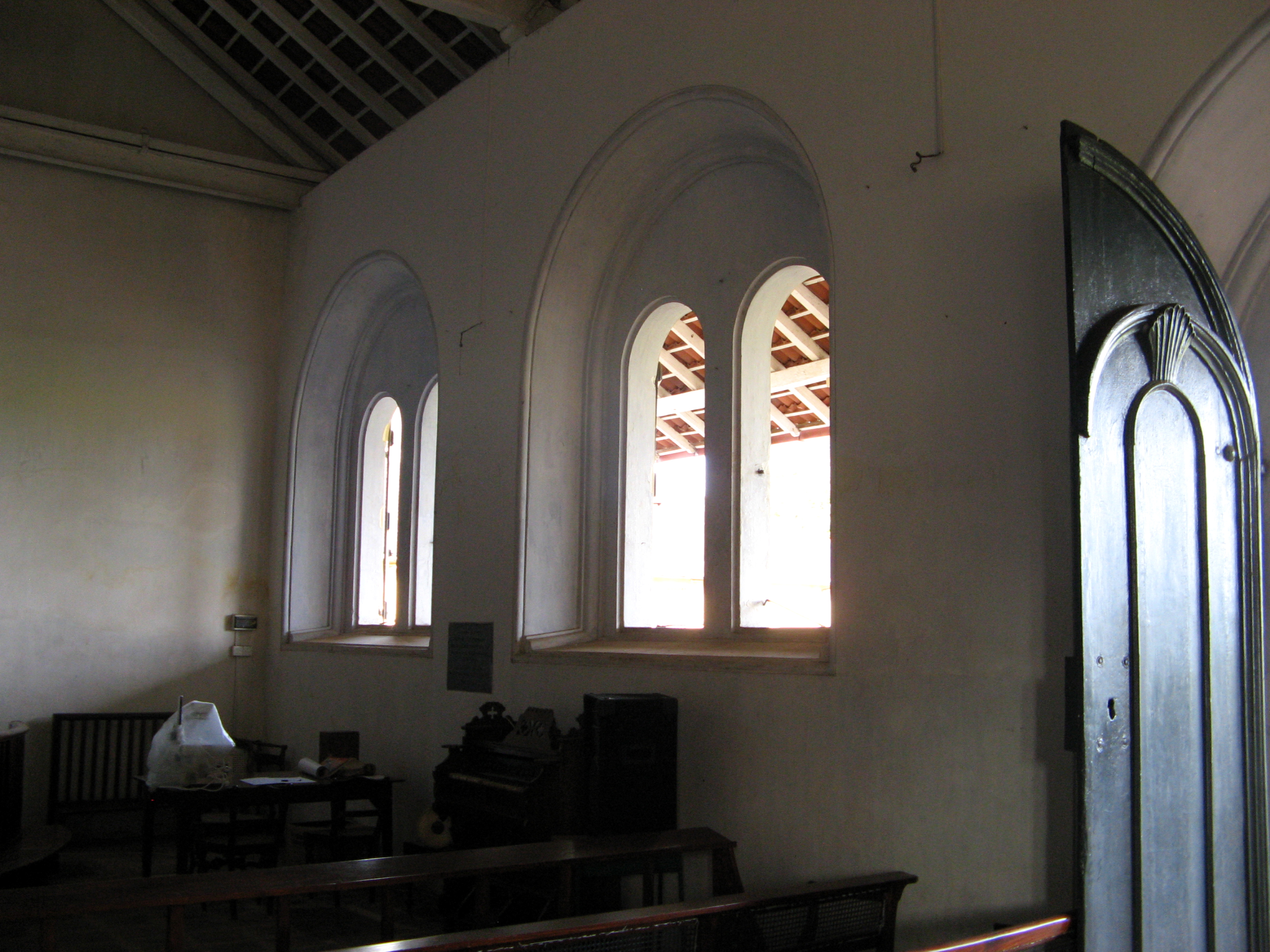
Interior of the church

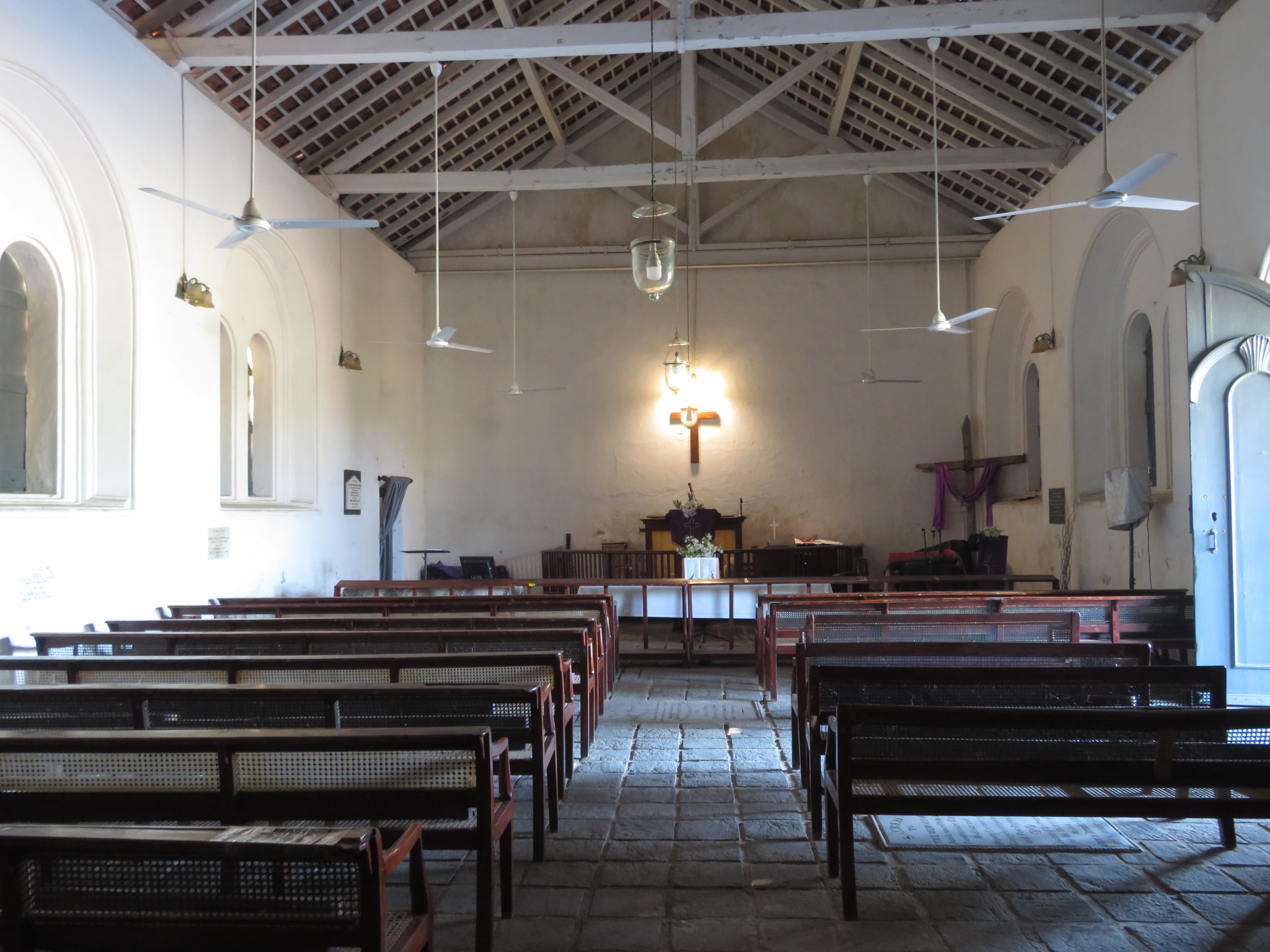
Interior of the Church 2024

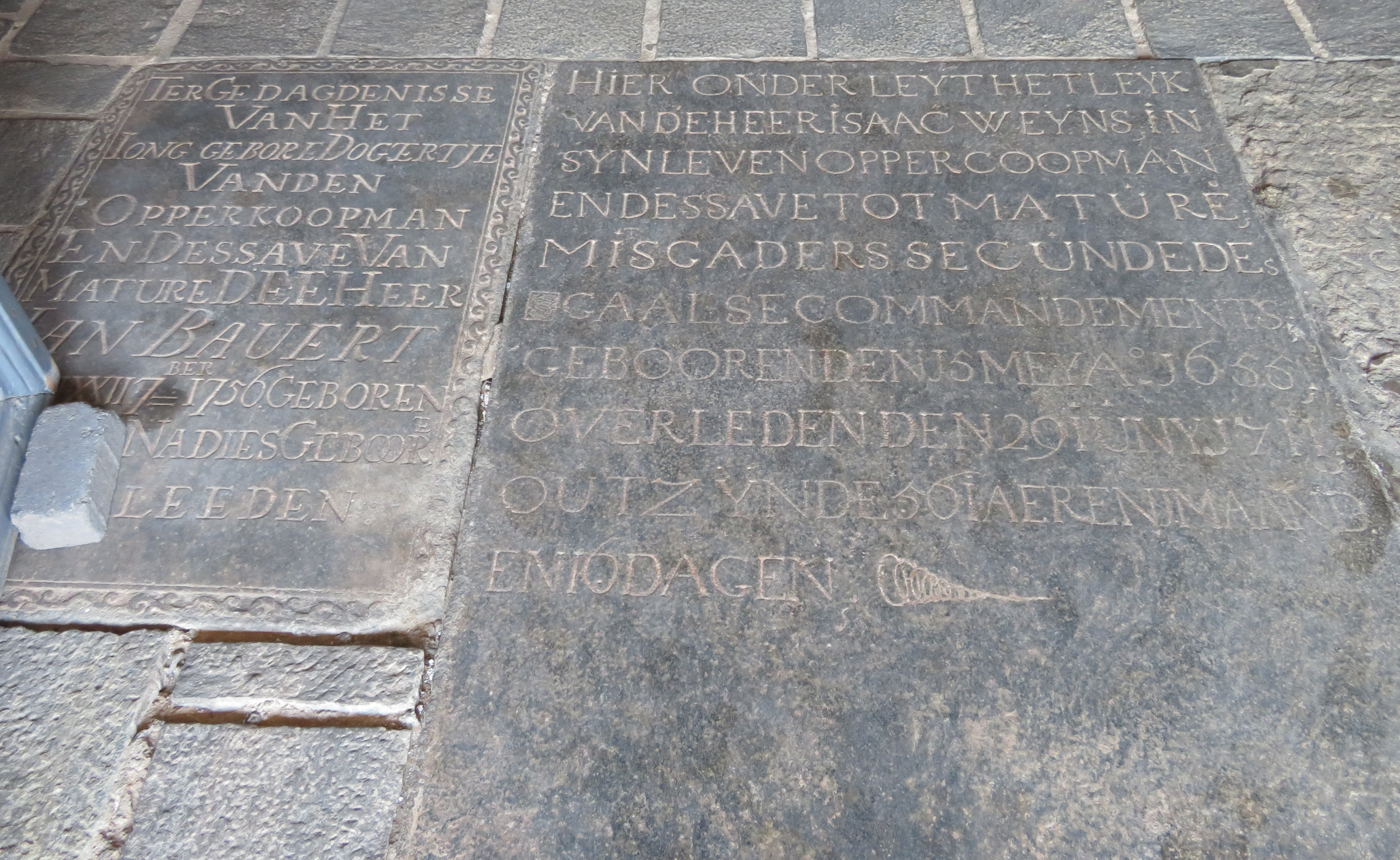
Dutch Tombstones
