= List of Buddhist temples in Sri Lanka =

This is a list of Buddhist temples, monasteries, stupas, and pagodas in Sri Lanka for which there are Wikipedia articles, sorted by location.

== Central Province ==
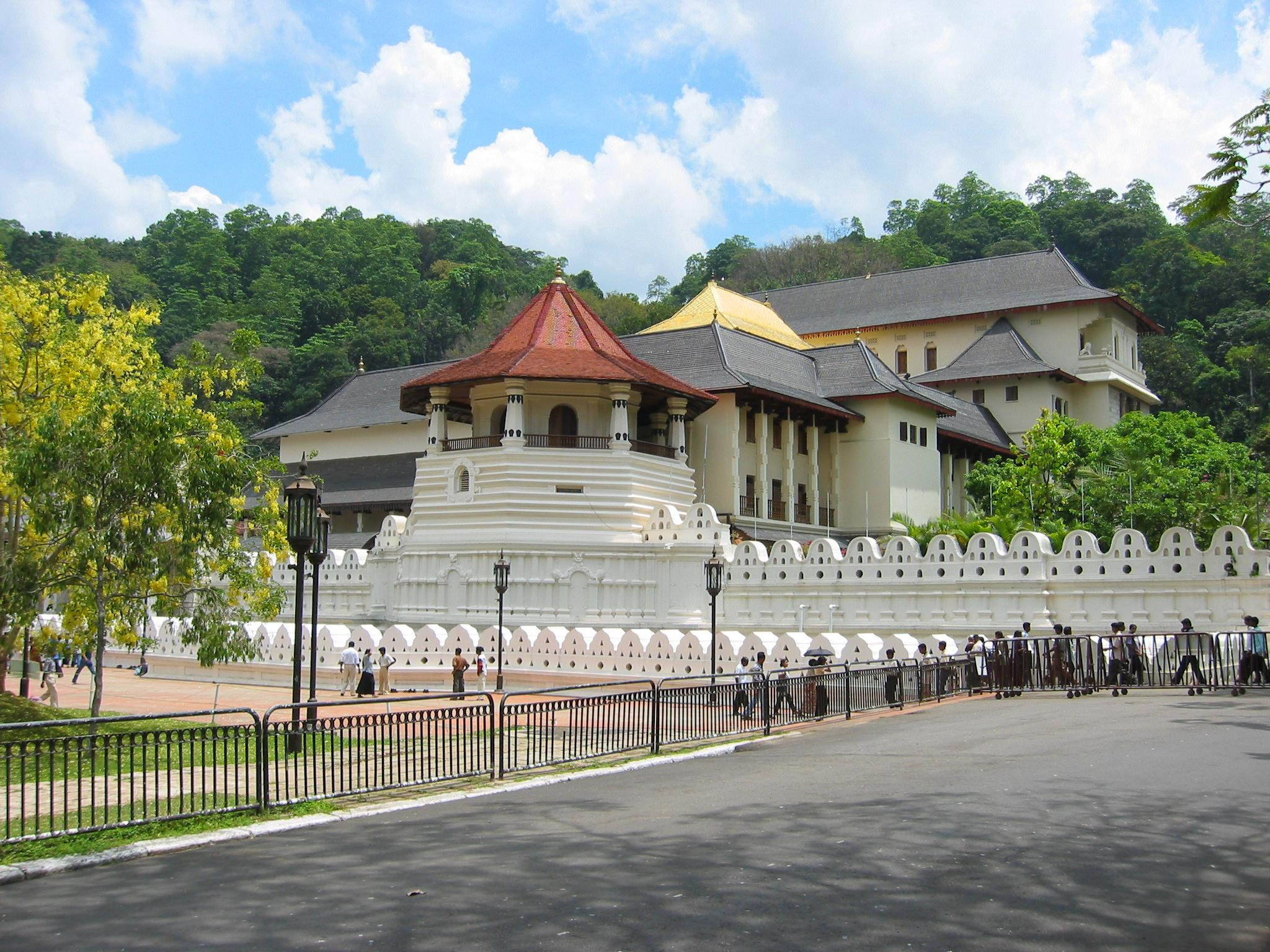
Sri Dalada Maligawa in Kandy

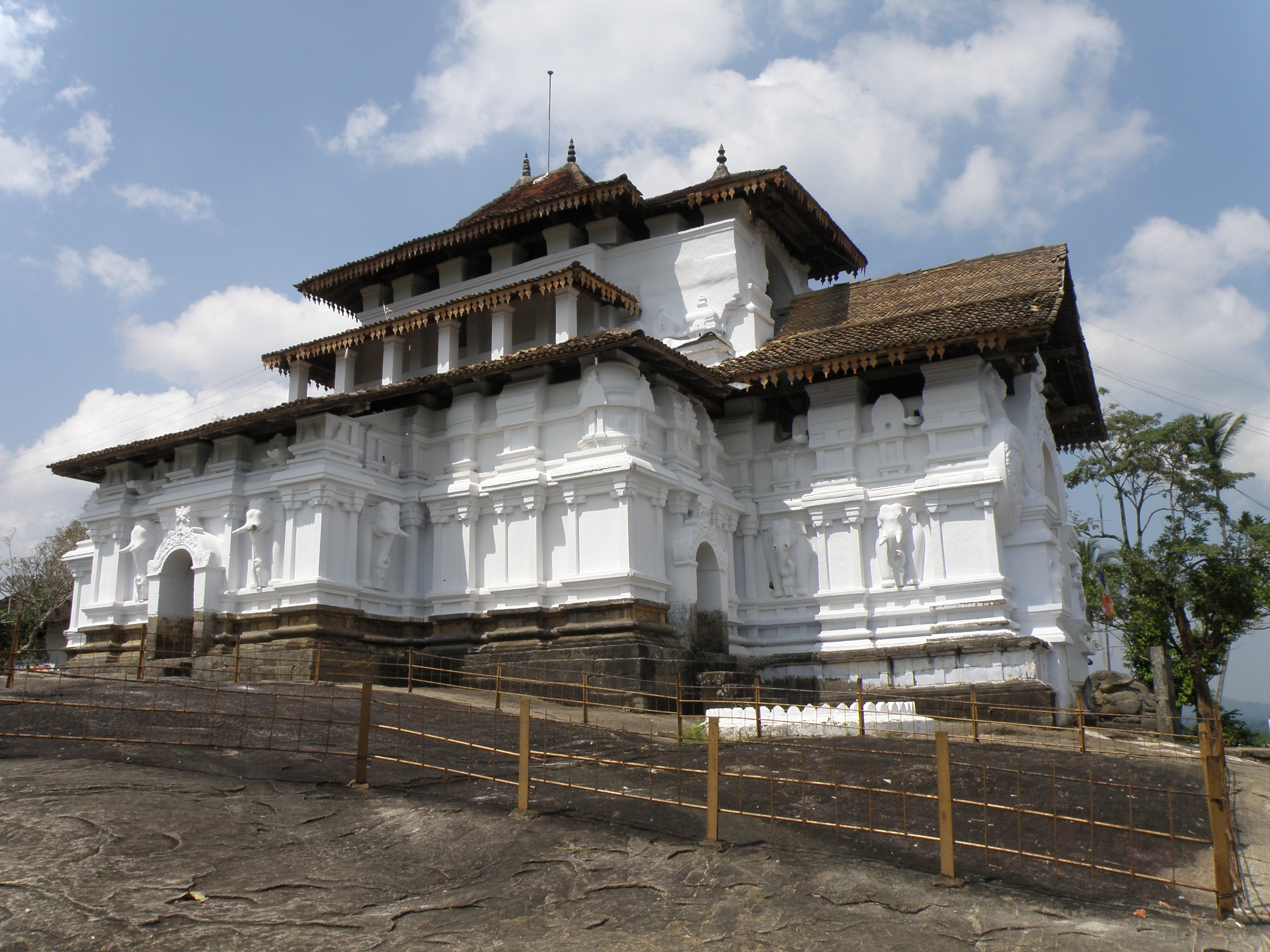
Lankatilaka Vihara in Pilimatalawa

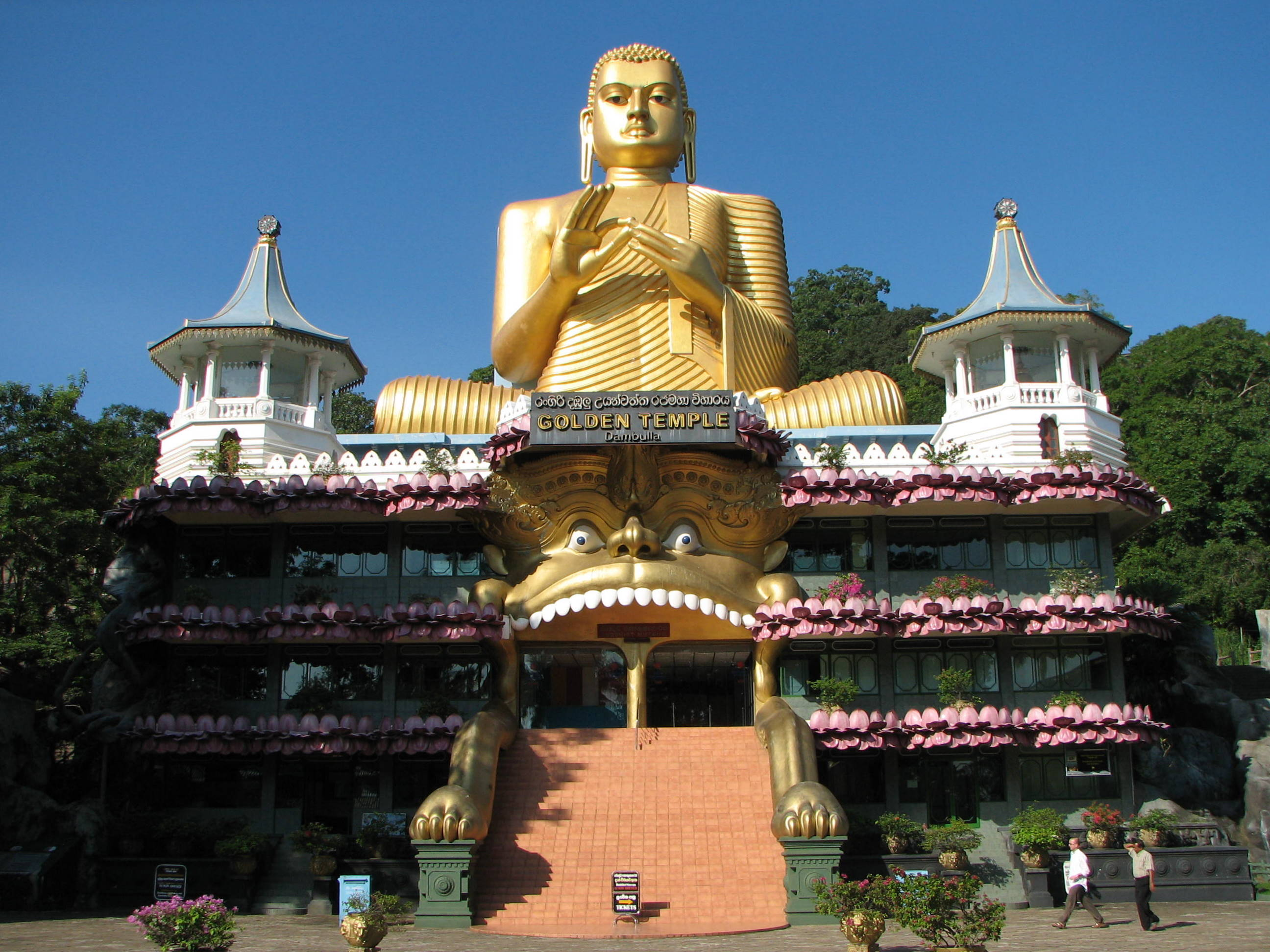
Golden Temple of Dambulla in Dambulla

=== Kandy District ===
- Asgiri Maha Viharaya, Kandy
- Degaldoruwa Raja Maha Vihara, Kundasale
- Devanapatissa Vipassana International Meditation Centre, Kandy
- Divurum Bodhi Viharaya, Kandy
- Gadaladeniya Vihara, Pilimatalawa
- Lankatilaka Vihara, Pilimatalawa
- Malwathu Maha Viharaya, Kandy
- Sri Maha Bodhi Viharaya, Kandy
- Temple of the Tooth [Sri Dalada Maligawa], Kandy

=== Matale District ===
- Aluvihare Rock Temple, Matale
- Dambulla cave temple, Dambulla
- Nalanda Gedige, Naula
- Pidurangala Vihara, Pidurangala

=== Nuwara Eliya District ===
- Kadadora Vihara, Kotmale
- Kotmale Mahaweli Maha Seya, Kotmale
- Pusulpitiya Raja Maha Vihara, Kotmale

== Eastern Province ==
=== Ampara District ===
- Deeghawapi, Ninthavur
- Galmaduwa Raja Maha Vihara, Ampara
- Gonagolla Vihara, Gonagolla
- Lahugala Kiri Vehera, Lahugala
- Lahugala Kota Vehera, Lahugala
- Magul Maha Viharaya, Lahugala
- Muhudu Maha Viharaya, Pottuvil
- Muwangala Raja Maha Vihara, Hingurana
- Neelagiriseya, Lahugala
- Ovagiriya, Polwatta
- Padiyadora Raja Maha Vihara, Padiyathalawa
- Peace Pagoda, Ampara
- Piyangala Aranya Senasanaya, Mahaoya
- Rassagala, Bakkiella
- Samanabedda cave temple, Uhana
- Samangala Aranya Senasanaya, Mahaoya
- Sri Dharmendrarama Raja Maha Vihara, Gonagolla
- Udayagiri Raja Maha Vihara, Uhana
- Uththara Jayamaha Vihara, Hingurana

=== Trincomalee District ===
- Girihandu Seya
- Gokanna Vihara, Trincomalee
- Lankapatuna Samudragiri Viharaya
- Seruvila Mangala Raja Maha Viharaya
- Velgam Vehera

== Northern Province ==
=== Jaffna District ===
- Ancient Kadurugoda Viharaya, Chunnakam
- Nagadeepa Purana Vihara, Nagadeepa

== North Central Province ==
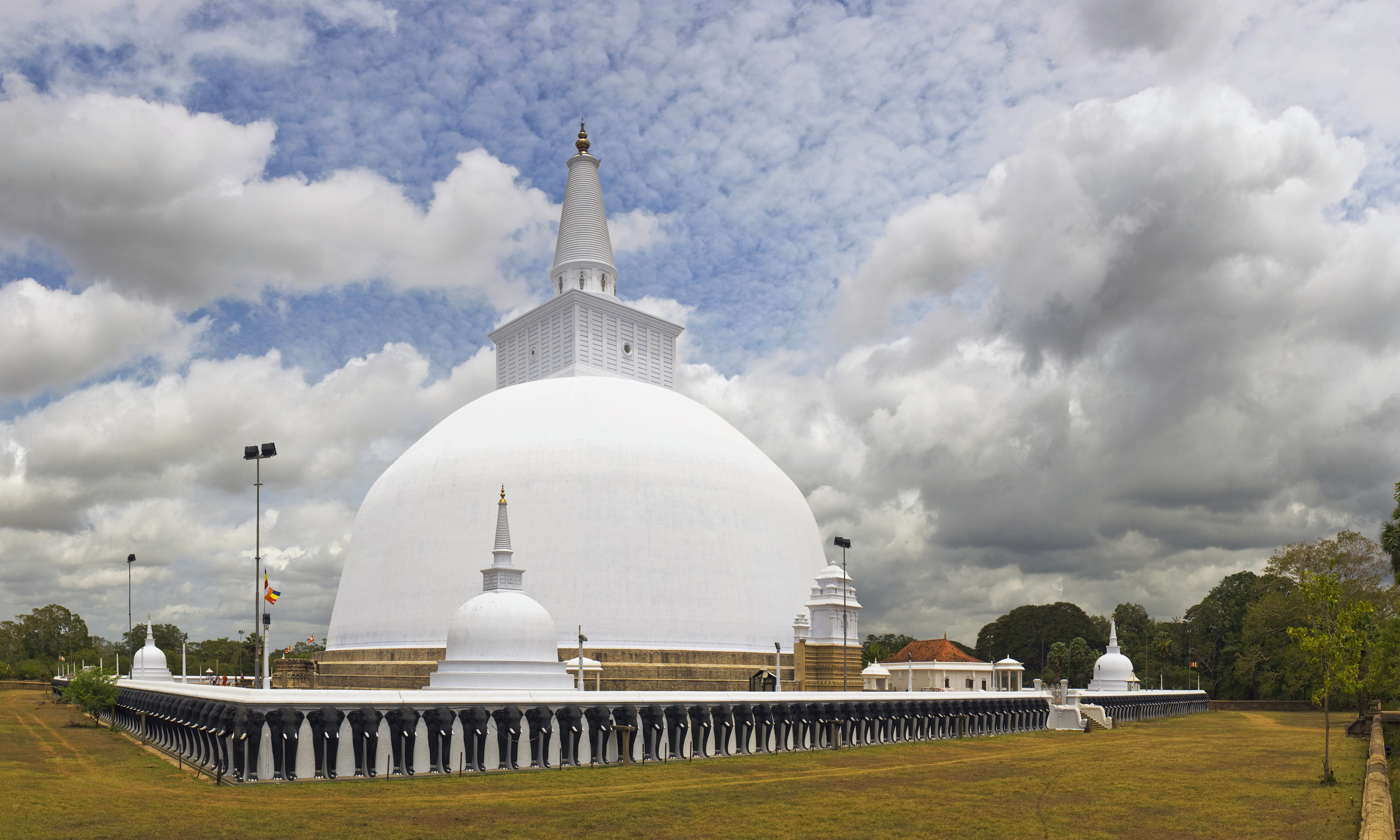
Ruwanwelisaya in Anuradhapura

=== Anuradhapura District ===
- Abhayagiriya
- Anuradhapura Maha Viharaya
- Atamasthana
- Avukana Buddha Statue
- Dakkhina Stupa
- Isurumuniya
- Jetavanarama
- Kiribath Vehera
- Lankarama
- Lovamahapaya
- Mayura Pirivena
- Mihintale Rajamaha Viharaya, Mihintale
- Mirisaveti Stupa
- Naka Vihara
- Ritigala Buddhist Monastery, Ritigala
- Ruwanwelisaya
- Samadhi Statue
- Sandahiru Seya
- Sela Cetiya
- Sri Maha Bodhiya
- Thanthirimale Raja Maha Viharaya, Thanthirimale
- Thuparamaya
- Vessagiri

=== Polonnaruwa District ===
- Dimbulagala Raja Maha Vihara, Dimbulagala
- Gal Vihara, Polonnaruwa
- Hatadage, Polonnaruwa
- Medirigiriya Vatadage, Medirigiriya
- Polonnaruwa Vatadage, Polonnaruwa
- Rankoth Vehera, Polonnaruwa
- Somawathiya Stupa, Polonnaruwa
- Unagalawehera Rajamaha Viharaya, Hingurakgoda

== North Western Province ==
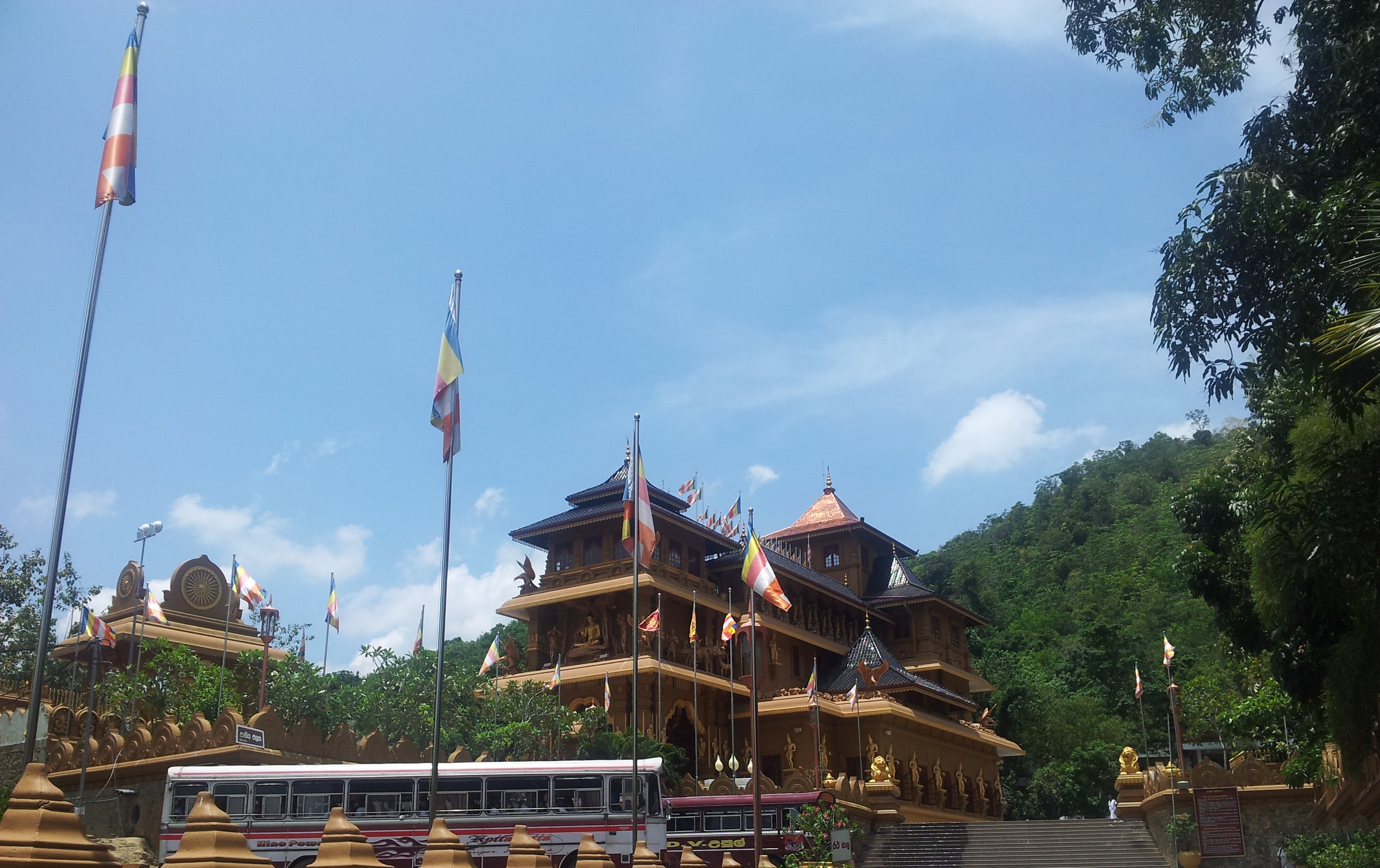
Mahamevnawa Buddhist Monastery in Polgahawela

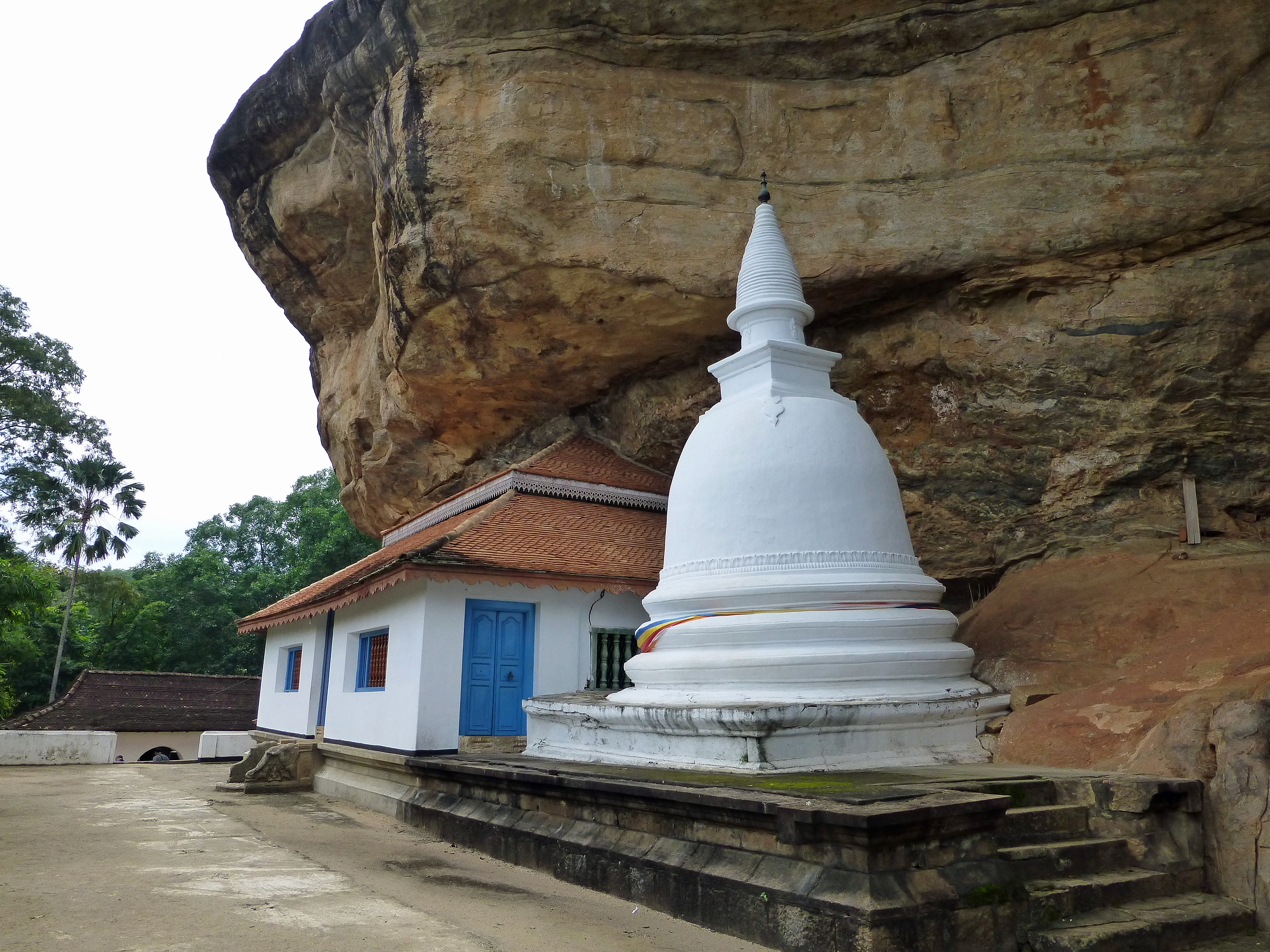
Ridi Viharaya in Rideegama

=== Kurunegala District ===
- Hatthikucchi Viharaya, Mahagalkadawala
- Ibbagala Raja Maha Vihara
- Mahamevnawa Buddhist Monastery, Polgahawela
- Na Uyana Aranya
- Nikasala Aranya Senasanaya
- Panduwasnuwara Raja Maha Vihara, Panduwasnuwara
- Reswehera
- Ridi Viharaya, Rideegama

=== Puttalam District ===
- Malwila Raja Maha Vihara, Vanatavilluwa
- Mulgirigala Raja Maha Vihara, Navagattegama
- Paramakanda Raja Maha Vihara, Anamaduwa
- Senanayake Aramaya, Madampe
- Suvisuddharamaya, Manakkulama

== Sabaragamuwa Province ==
=== Ratnapura District ===
- Abhayathilakarathnaramaya, Kuruwita
- Adam's Peak
- Aramanapola Raja Maha Vihara, Pelmadulla
- Batatotalena Cave Vihara, Kuruwita
- Delgamuwa Raja Maha Vihara, Kuruwita
- Kuragala

=== Kegalle District ===
- Beligammana Raja Maha Vihara, Mawanella
- Dodanthale Raja Maha Vihara, Mawanella

== Southern Province ==
=== Galle District ===
- Island Hermitage
- Kothduwa temple, Maduganga River
- Pilana Raja Maha Vihara
- Sri Pushparama Vihara, Balapitiya
- Sunandarama Vihara

=== Matara District ===
- Matara Bodhiya, Matara

=== Hambantota District ===
- Kasagala Raja Maha Vihara, Angunakolapelassa
- Mulkirigala Raja Maha Vihara, Mulkirigala
- Naigala Raja Maha Vihara, Weeraketiya
- Sithulpawwa Rajamaha Viharaya, Kataragama
- Tissamaharama Raja Maha Vihara, Tissamaharama
- Yatala Vehera, Tissamaharama

== Uva Province ==
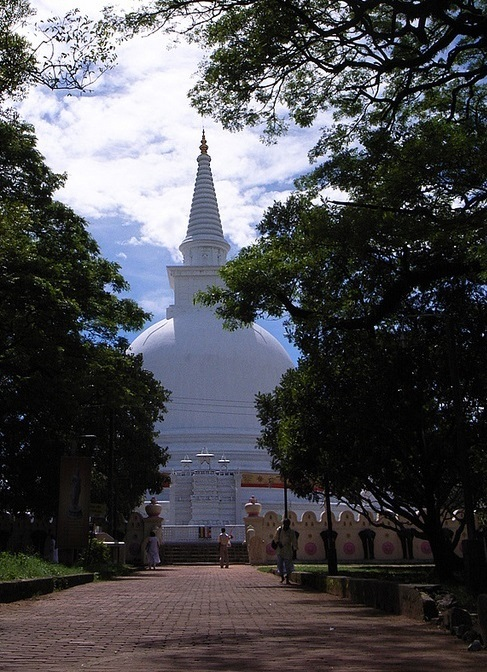
Mahiyangana Dagoba

=== Badulla District ===
- Dhowa rock temple, Bandarawela
- Mahiyangana Raja Maha Vihara, Mahiyangana
- Muthiyangana Raja Maha Vihara, Badulla

=== Monaragala District ===
- Buddama Raja Maha Vihara, Siyambalanduwa
- Buduruwagala Rajamaha Vihara, Wellawaya
- Dematamal Viharaya, Okkampitiya
- Kanabiso Pokuna Raja Maha Vihara, Handapanagala
- Keheliya Raja Maha Vihara, Handapanagala
- Kiri Vehera, Kataragama

== Western Province ==
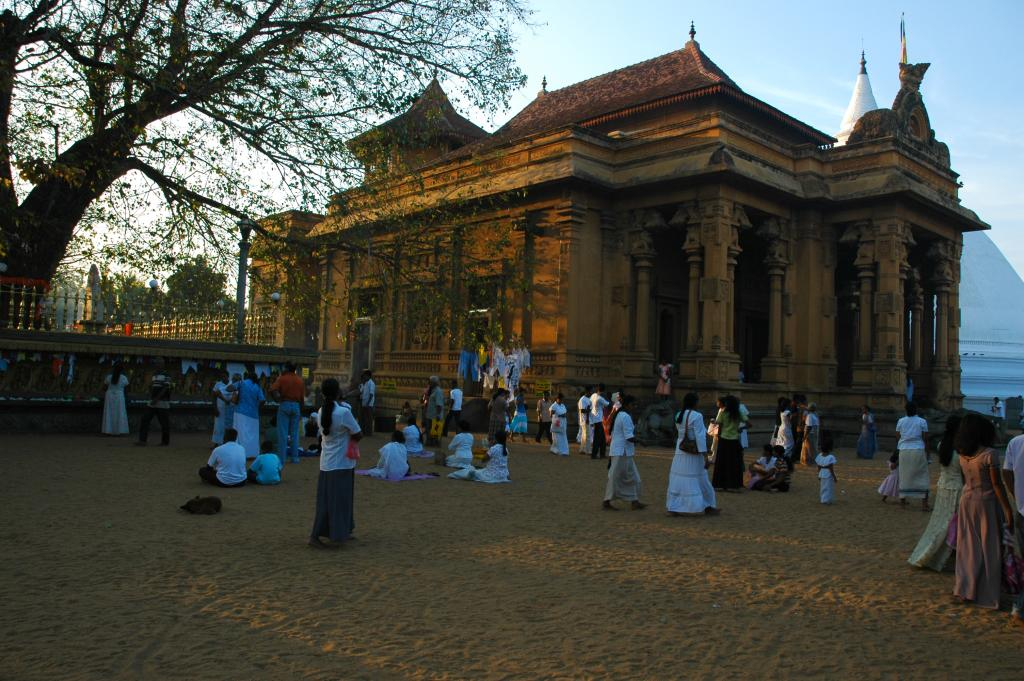
Kelaniya Raja Maha Vihara in Kelaniya

=== Colombo District ===
- Balapokuna Raja Maha Vihara, Pamankada
- Bellanwila Rajamaha Viharaya, Bellanwila
- Buddhist Cultural Centre, Dehiwala
- Gangaramaya Temple, Colombo
- Isipathanaramaya Temple, Havelock Town
- Kotte Raja Maha Vihara, Sri Jayawardenepura Kotte
- Kshetrarama Maha Vihara, Moratuwa
- Sambodhi Chaithya, Colombo Harbour
- Samudrasanna Vihara, Mount-Lavinia
- Seema Malaka, Beira Lake
- Siri Perakumba Pirivena, Sri Jayawardenepura Kotte
- Sri Pushparama Vihara, Ratmalana
- Sri Subodharama Raja Maha Vihara, Dehiwala

=== Gampaha District ===
- Aluthepola Ganekanda Raja Maha Vihara, Minuwangoda
- Asgiriya Raja Maha Vihara, Gampaha
- Kelaniya Raja Maha Vihara
- Koskandawala Raja Maha Vihara
- Maligatenna Raja Maha Vihara
- Nissarana Vanaya
- Panasawanarama Purana Vihara
- Pilikuththuwa Raja Maha Vihara
- Sri Saddharmagupta Piriven Vihara
- Uruwala Valagamba Raja Maha Vihara
- Uththararama Purana Vihara, Udugampola
- Warana Raja Maha Vihara
- Yatawatte Purana Vihara

=== Kalutara District ===
- Asokaramaya Buddhist Temple, Kalutara
- Kalutara Bodhiya, Kalutara
- Kande Vihara, Aluthgama

== See also ==
- Architecture of Sri Lanka
- Buddhism in Sri Lanka
- List of Buddhist temples
