= Udayagiri Raja Maha Vihara =

Buddhist Temple in Ampara District, Sri Lanka

- උදයගිරි රජ මහා විහාරය
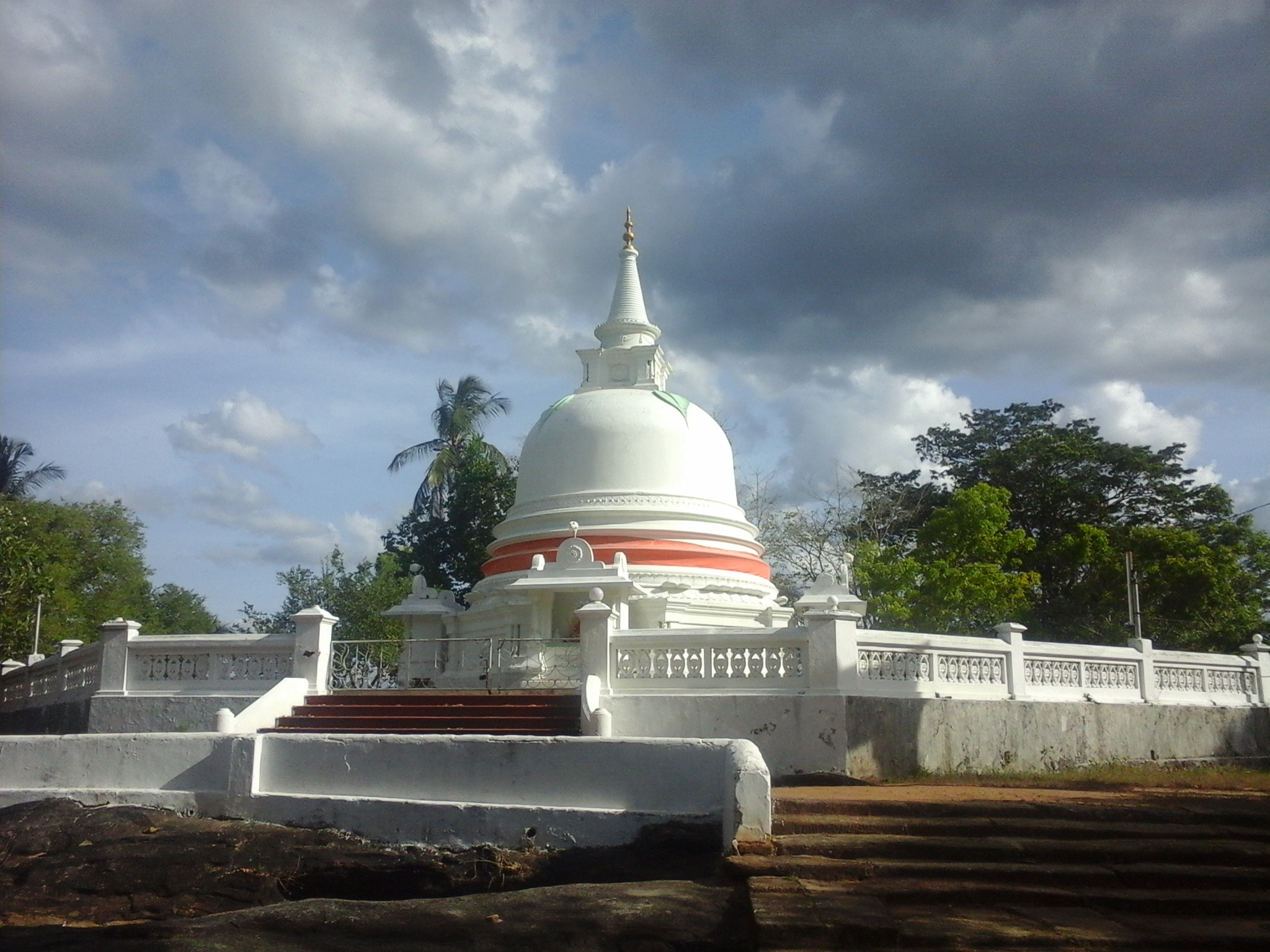
- The Stupa at the Vihara

- Location within Sri Lanka

Religion
- Affiliation: Buddhism
- District: Ampara
- Province: Eastern Province

Location
- Location: Udayagiri, Ampara, Sri Lanka
- Coordinates: 07°22′56.7″N 81°37′57.4″E

Architecture
- Type: Buddhist Temple
- Archaeological Protected Monument of Sri Lanka
- Designated: 26 December 2014

Udayagiri Raja Maha Vihara (Sinhalaː උදයගිරි රජ මහා විහාරය) is an ancient Buddhist Temple situated in Ampara District, Sri Lanka. The temple has been built in the village called Udayagiri, and is located about 1 km (0.62 mi) from Ampara – Mahaoya Road. The temple has been formally recognised by the Government as an archaeological site in Sri Lanka.

== History ==
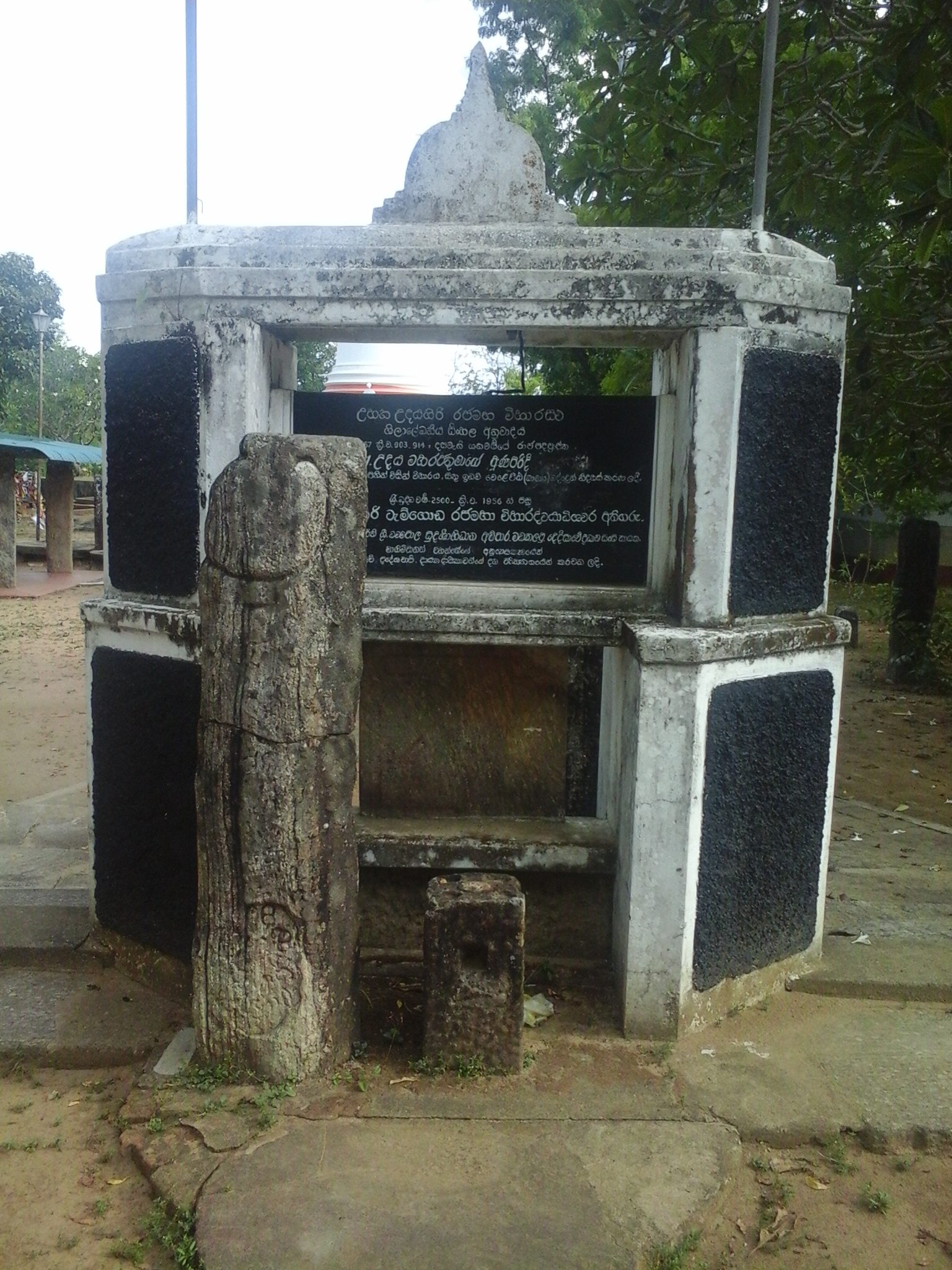
The stone pillar with an inscription belongs to the reign of King Udaya I

It is believed that the history of this temple goes back over 1000 years. But according to the features of archaeological remains in the Vihara premises, archaeologists assume that this temple may have been established during the pre–Christian era. A stone pillar with an inscription at the entrance of Vihara states that this Vihara was exempted from taxes by two generals of King Udaya I (901 - 912).

== Notes ==
- "Part I : Section (I) — General Government Notifications" (PDF). The Gazette of the Democratic Socialist Republic of Sri Lanka. 1895. 26 December 2014.
