= Sri Dharmendrarama Raja Maha Vihara =

Sri Dharmendrarama Purana Raja Maha Vihara
- ශ්‍රී ධර්මේන්ද්‍රාරාම පුරාණ රජ මහා විහාරය
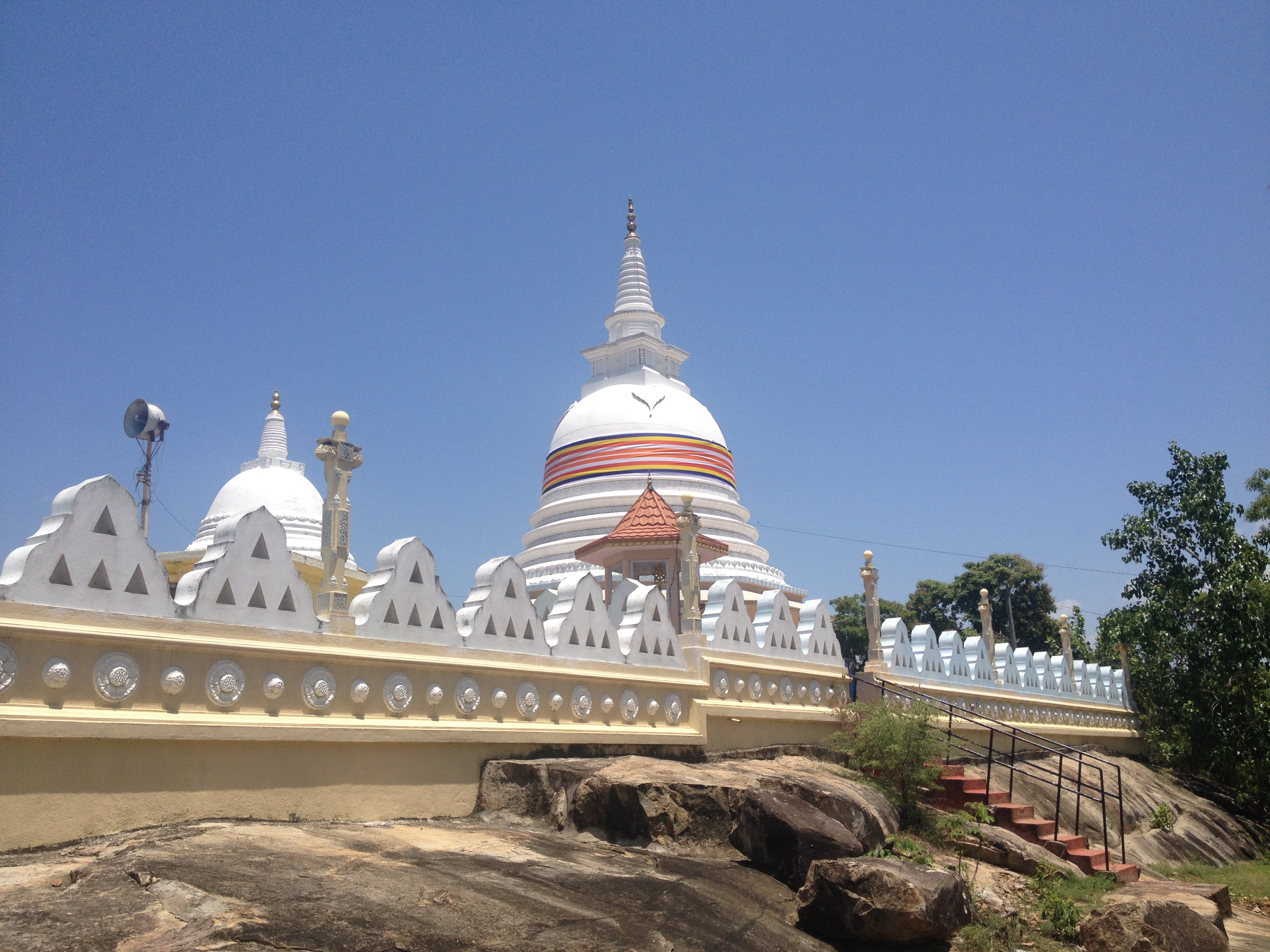
- The Stupa at the Vihara

Religion
- Affiliation: Buddhism
- District: Ampara
- Province: Eastern Province

Location
- Location: No.30, Mayadunna, Gonagolla
- Country: Sri Lanka
- Interactive map of Sri Dharmendrarama Purana Raja Maha Vihara
- Coordinates: 07°25′37.6″N 81°38′02.3″E

Architecture
- Type: Buddhist Temple
- Archaeological Protected Monument of Sri Lanka
- Designated: 10 October 2014

Sri Dharmendrarama Purana Raja Maha Vihara (also known as Mayadunna Pansala) (Sinhala: ශ්‍රී ධර්මේන්ද්‍රාරාම පුරාණ රජ මහා විහාරය හෝ මායාදුන්න පන්සල) is an ancient Buddhist temple in Mayadunna, Sri Lanka. The temple is located in the Gonagolla village on Ampara – Maha Oya road approximately 10 km (6.2 mi) distance from Uhana town. The temple has been formally recognised by the Government as an archaeological site in Sri Lanka. The designation was declared on 10 October 2014 under the government Gazette number 1884.

== The temple ==
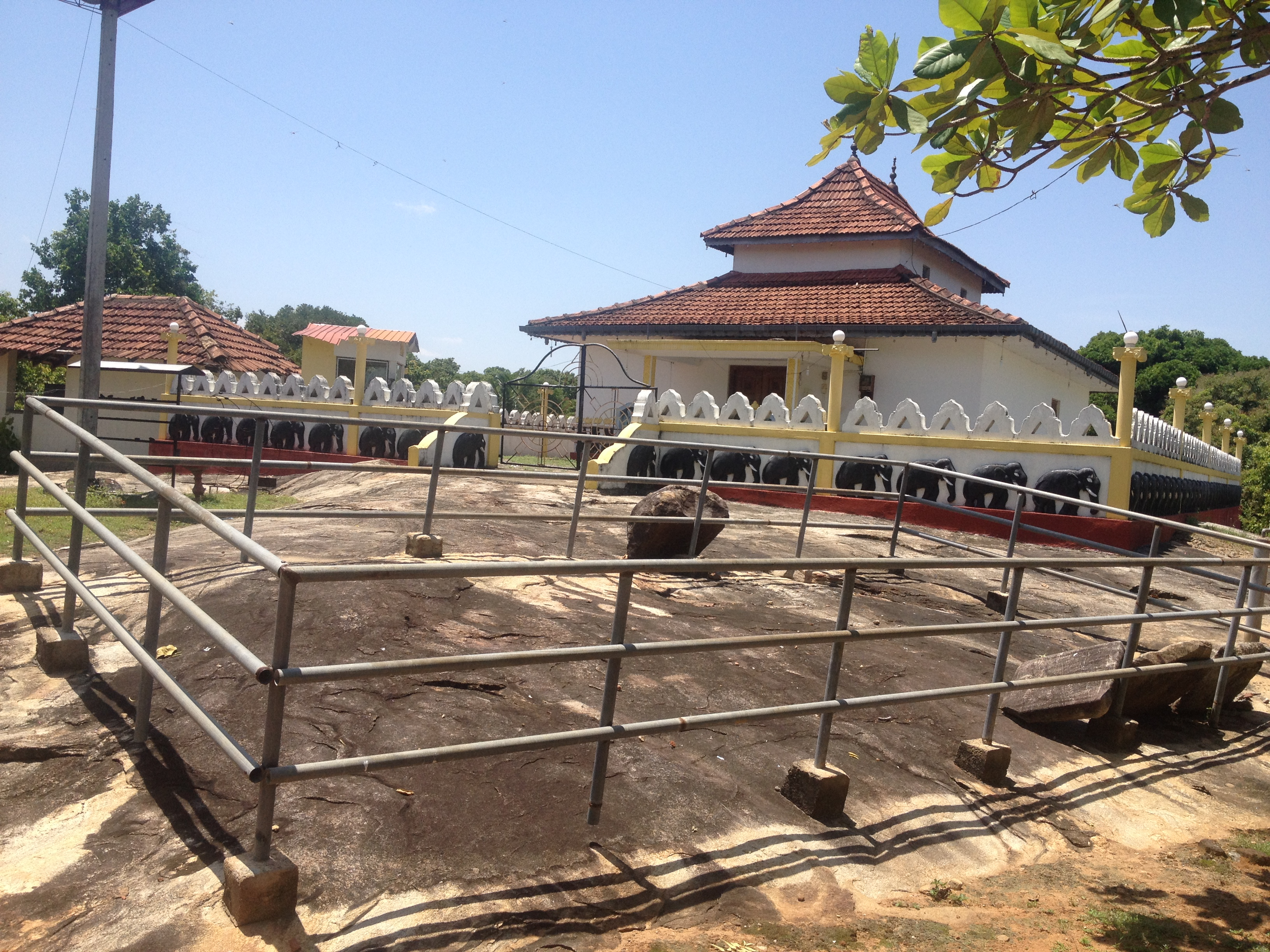
The rock inscription and the image house of Mayadunna Vihara

The temple in Mayadunna has been constructed on a natural rock plateau belonging to the Uhana DS. Most buildings that stand today at the temple are recent constructions but some of the ancient structures such as slabs of Buddha footprint, pieces of Sandakada pahana, bases of buildings and pillars still can be found within the premises. Before the construction of Buddha statues, people used various objects such as Asanaghara and Sri Pathul Gal (Buddha footprint) to represent Buddha. Therefore, the presence of Sri Pathul Gal or Asanaghara in a temple is considered by the archaeology as an indicator that the temple was there before the Buddha statues were built in the country. Also a rock inscription, engraved on the rock plateau between the image house and the pond has been protected by the archaeological department.
