= Samangala Aranya Senasanaya =

Samangala Forest Hermitage
- සමන්ගල ආරණ්‍ය සේනාසනය
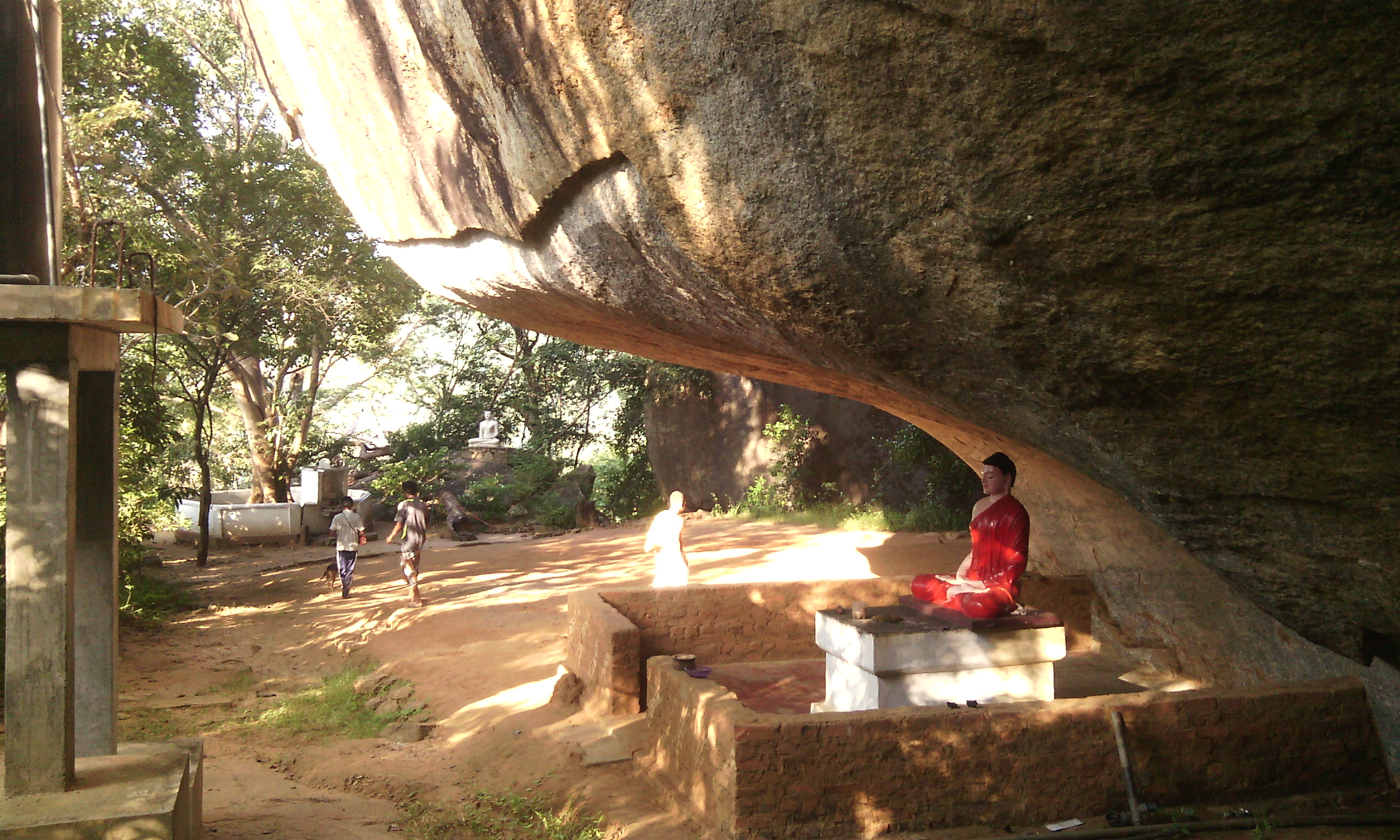
- A drip ledged cave

Religion
- Affiliation: Buddhism
- District: Ampara
- Province: Eastern Province

Location
- Location: Samangala, Ampara, Sri Lanka
- Interactive map of Samangala Forest Hermitage
- Coordinates: 07°24′39.5″N 81°34′52.3″E

Architecture
- Type: Buddhist Temple
- Style: Cave temple
- Archaeological Protected Monument of Sri Lanka
- Designated: 10 October 2014

Samangala Aranya Senasanaya or Samangala Forest Hermitage (Sinhalaː සමන්ගල ආරණ්‍ය සේනාසනය) is an ancient Cave temple in Ampara, Sri Lanka. The temple is located west from the Kohombana junction of Ampara - Mahaoya main road, approximately 23 km (14 mi) away from the Ampara town. The monastery has been formally recognised by the Government as an archaeological site in Sri Lanka.

It is believed that this temple complex was constructed by the king Saddha Tissa (137-119 BC) of Anuradhapura. During the recent history the site had been neglected due to the activities of Tamil Taiger separatist in the region. With the end of the civil war, the Hermitage was again accessible to the people. A large number of drip ledged caves with Pre Christian Brahmi cave inscriptions have been found on the slope of the eastern side of the Samangala mountain. An inscribed sketch in one cave illustrates a Stupa similar to the style of Sanchi Stupa in India.

== Sources ==
- "PART I : SECTION (I) — GENERAL Government Notifications" (PDF). The Gazette of the Democratic Socialist Republic of Sri Lanka (1884). 10 October 2014.
