= Samanabedda cave temple =

Ancient Buddhist temple

- සමනබැද්ද පුරාණ ගල්ලෙන් විහාරය
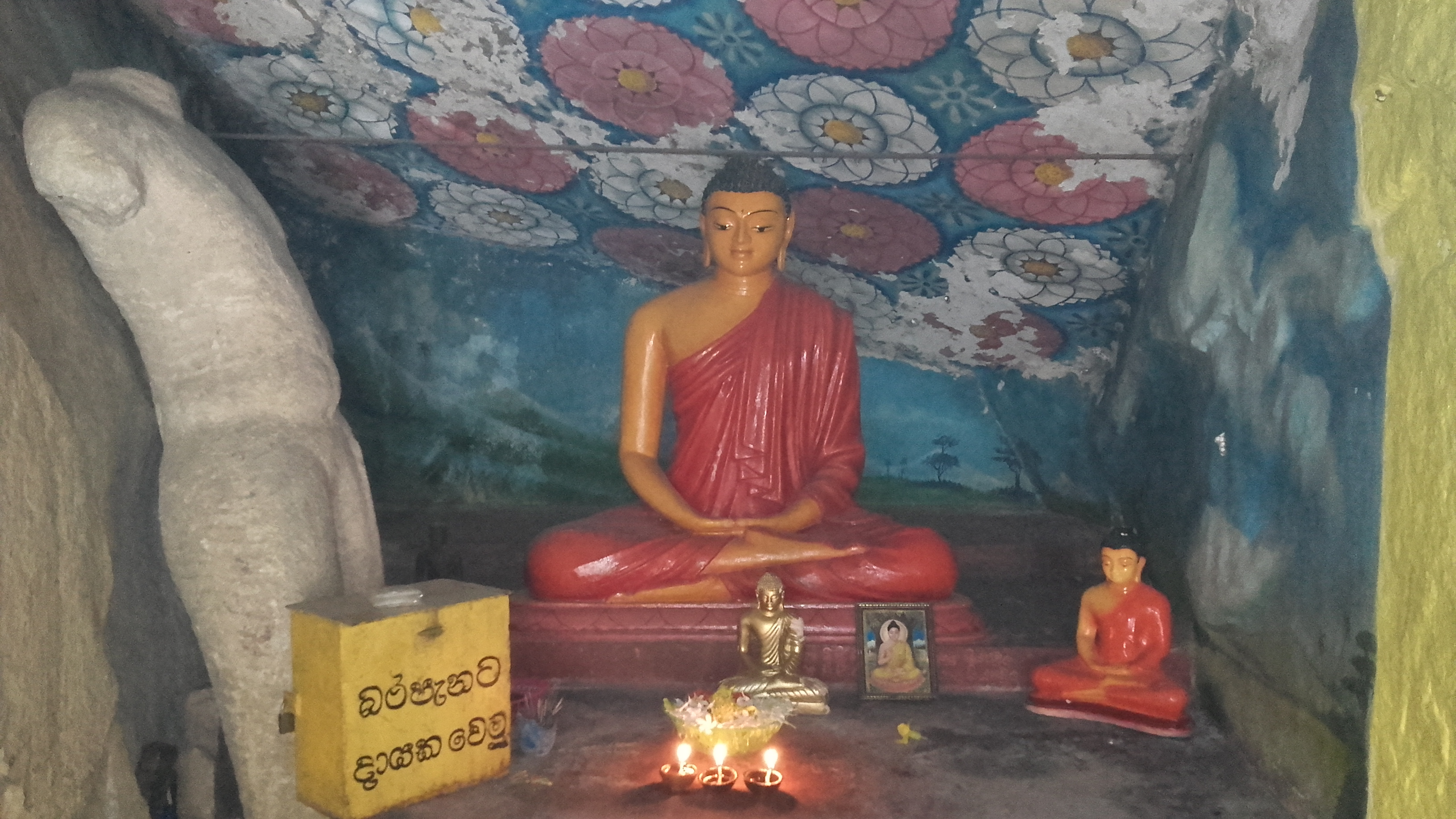
- A Buddha statue in the image house

Religion
- Affiliation: Buddhism
- District: Ampara
- Province: Eastern Province

Location
- Location: Uhana, Sri Lanka
- Interactive map of Samanabedda cave temple
- Coordinates: 07°20′35.1″N 81°38′59.0″E

Architecture
- Type: Buddhist Temple

Samanabedda cave temple (Sinhalaː සමනබැද්ද පුරාණ ගල්ලෙන් විහාරය) is an ancient Buddhist temple situated in Uhana, Ampara District, Sri Lanka. The temple lies on the Ampara – Mahaoya main road, approximately 6 km (3.7 mi) away from the town of Ampara. The temple has been formally recognised by the Government as an archaeological site in Sri Lanka. It is believed that the temple was built by king Saddha Tissa (137–119 BC).

== Gallery ==
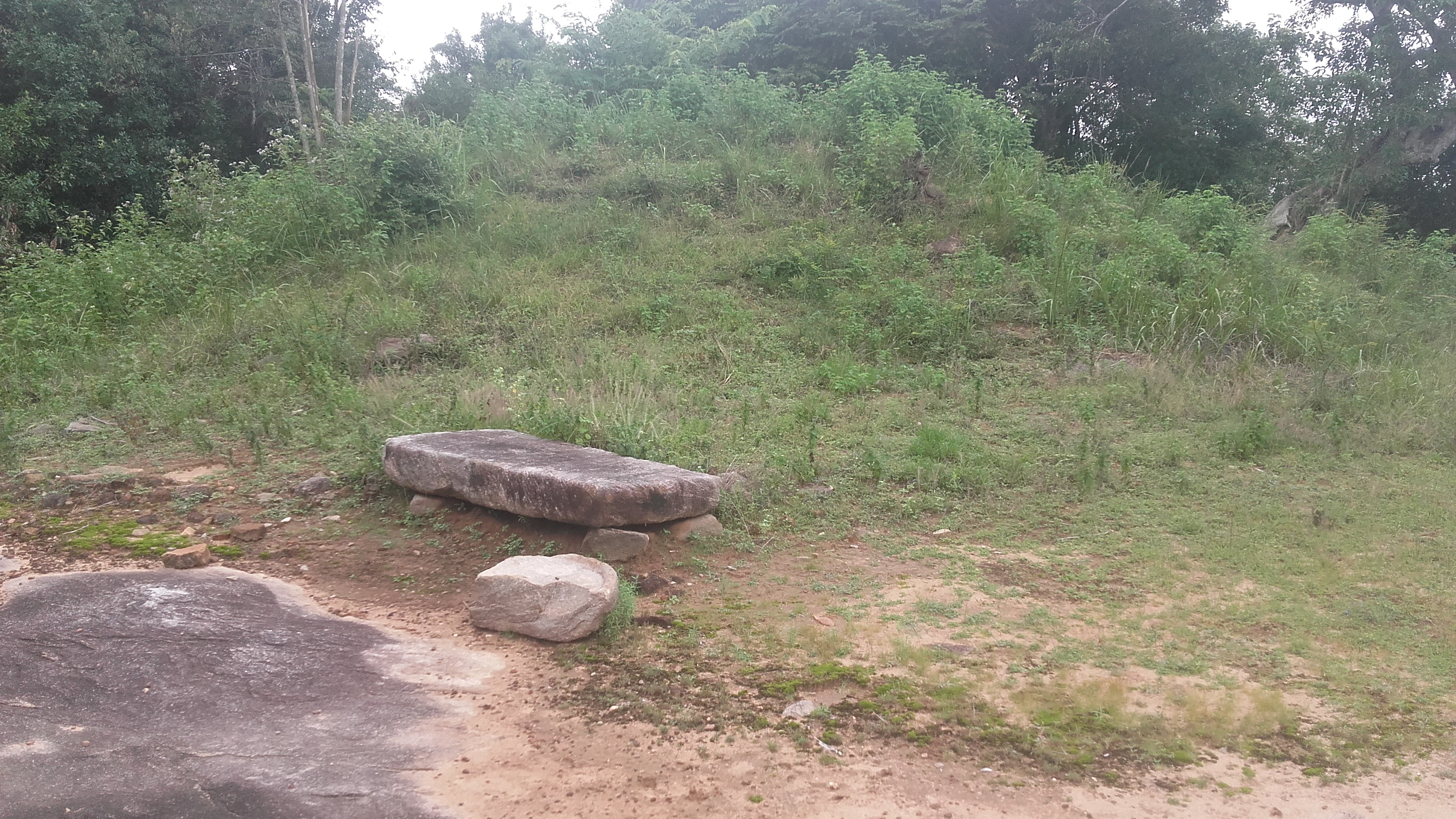
The ruined Stupa

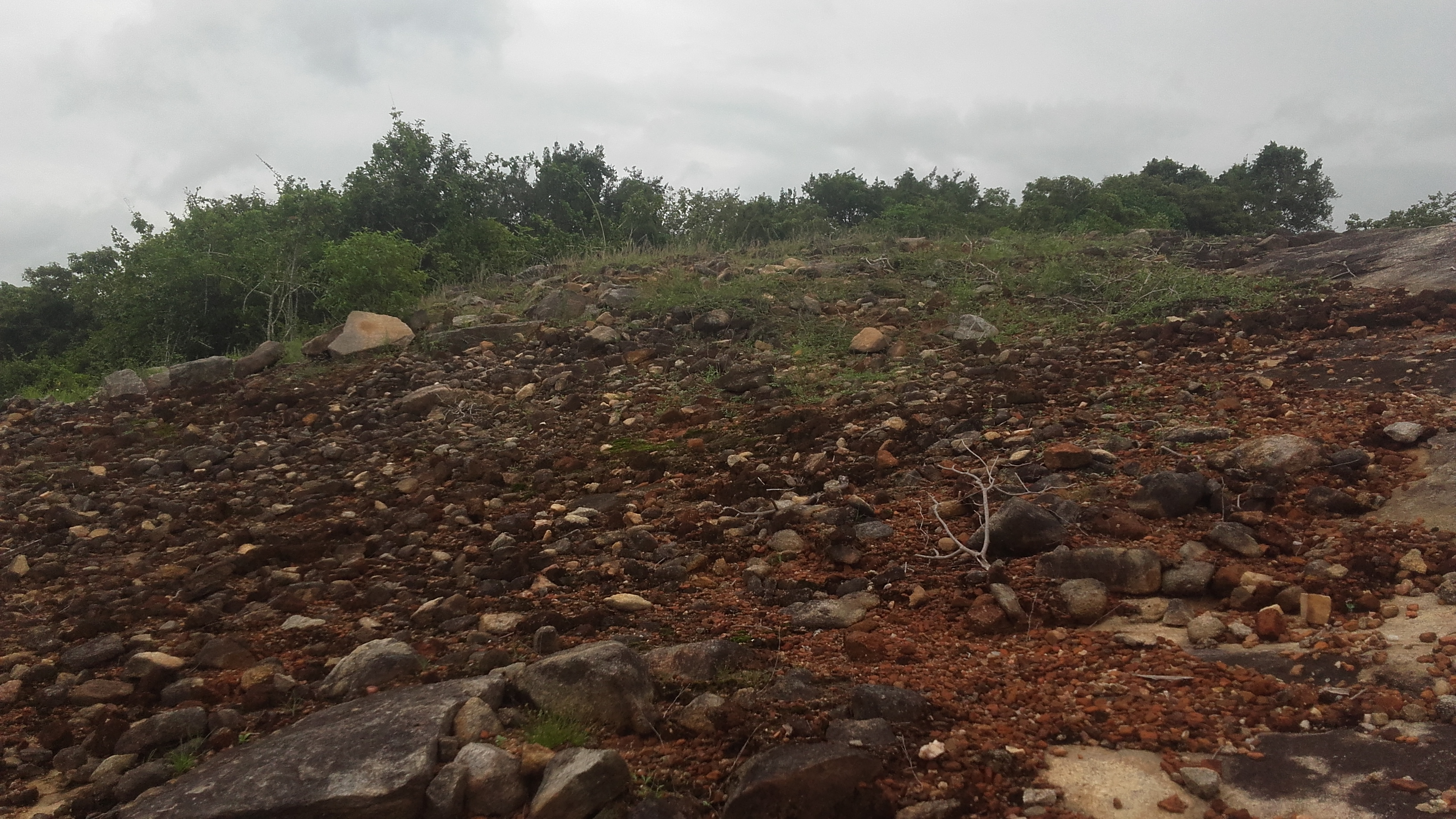
Rubble of ruined buildings
