= Piyangala Aranya Senasanaya =

Ancient Buddhist temple in Sri Lanka

Piyangala Forest Hermitage
- පියංගල ආරණ්‍ය සේනාසනය
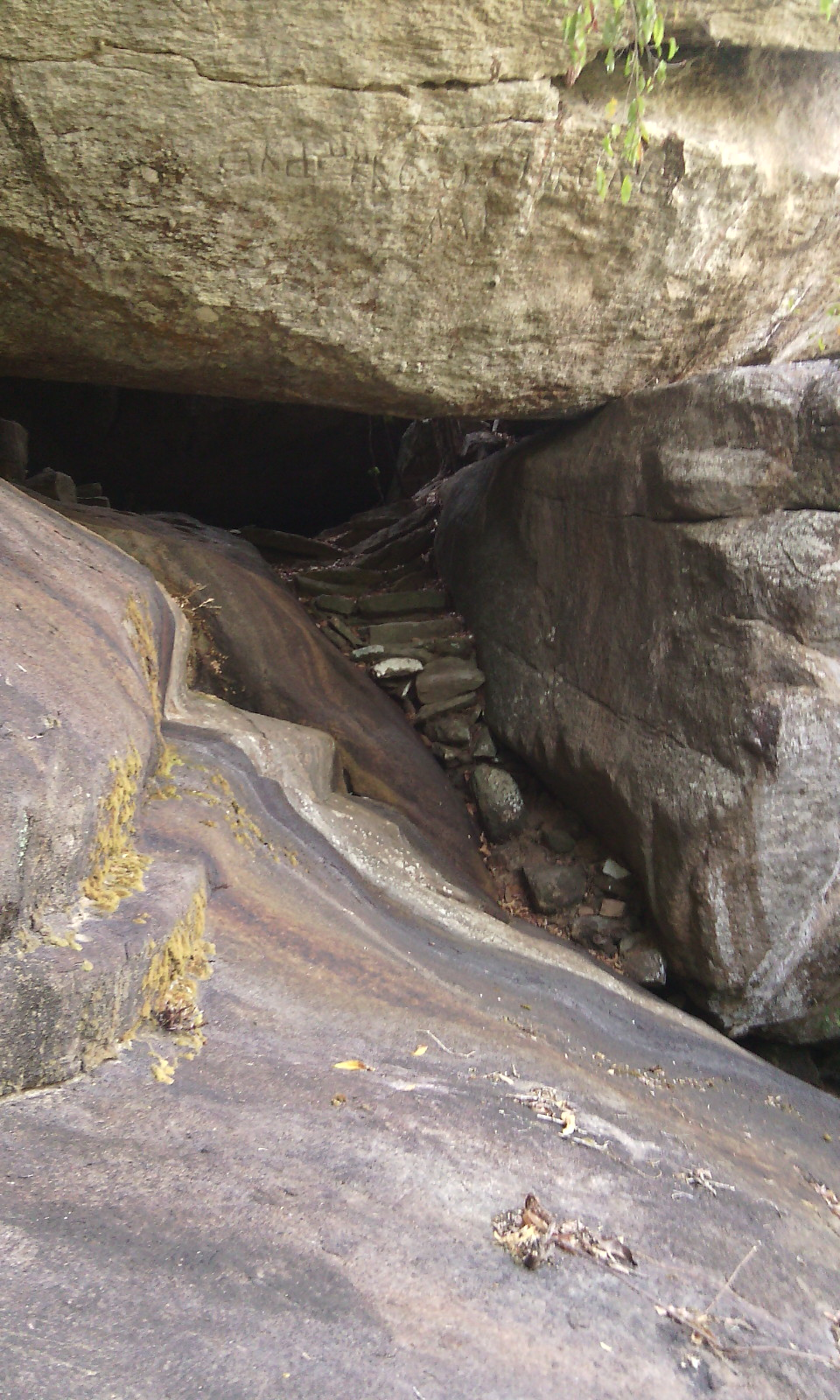
- A drip ledged cave with Brahmi inscription

- Location within Sri Lanka

Religion
- Affiliation: Buddhism
- District: Ampara
- Province: Eastern Province

Location
- Location: Piyangala, Ampara, Sri Lanka
- Coordinates: 07°29′46.0″N 81°37′53.6″E

Architecture
- Type: Buddhist Temple
- Style: Cave temple
- Archaeological Protected Monument of Sri Lanka
- Designated: 26 December 2014

Piyangala Aranya Senasanaya or Piyangala Forest Hermitage (Sinhalaː පියංගල ආරණ්‍ය සේනාසනය) is an ancient Buddhist temple in Ampara, Sri Lanka. The temple lies on the Ampara – Mahaoya main road, approximately 27 km (17 mi) away from the town of Ampara. The temple has been formally recognised by the Government as an archaeological site in Sri Lanka.

== History ==
It is believed that this temple was constructed during the pre-Christian era. The site consists of a number of drip ledged caves with Brahmi inscriptions and ruins. A few inscriptions detail the donation of caves by Rajithaa, and a daughter of King Dutugamunu. According to the view of Ellawala Medhananda Thera, these inscriptions are important as they reveal the names of Dutugemunu's queens and children.

== Gallery ==
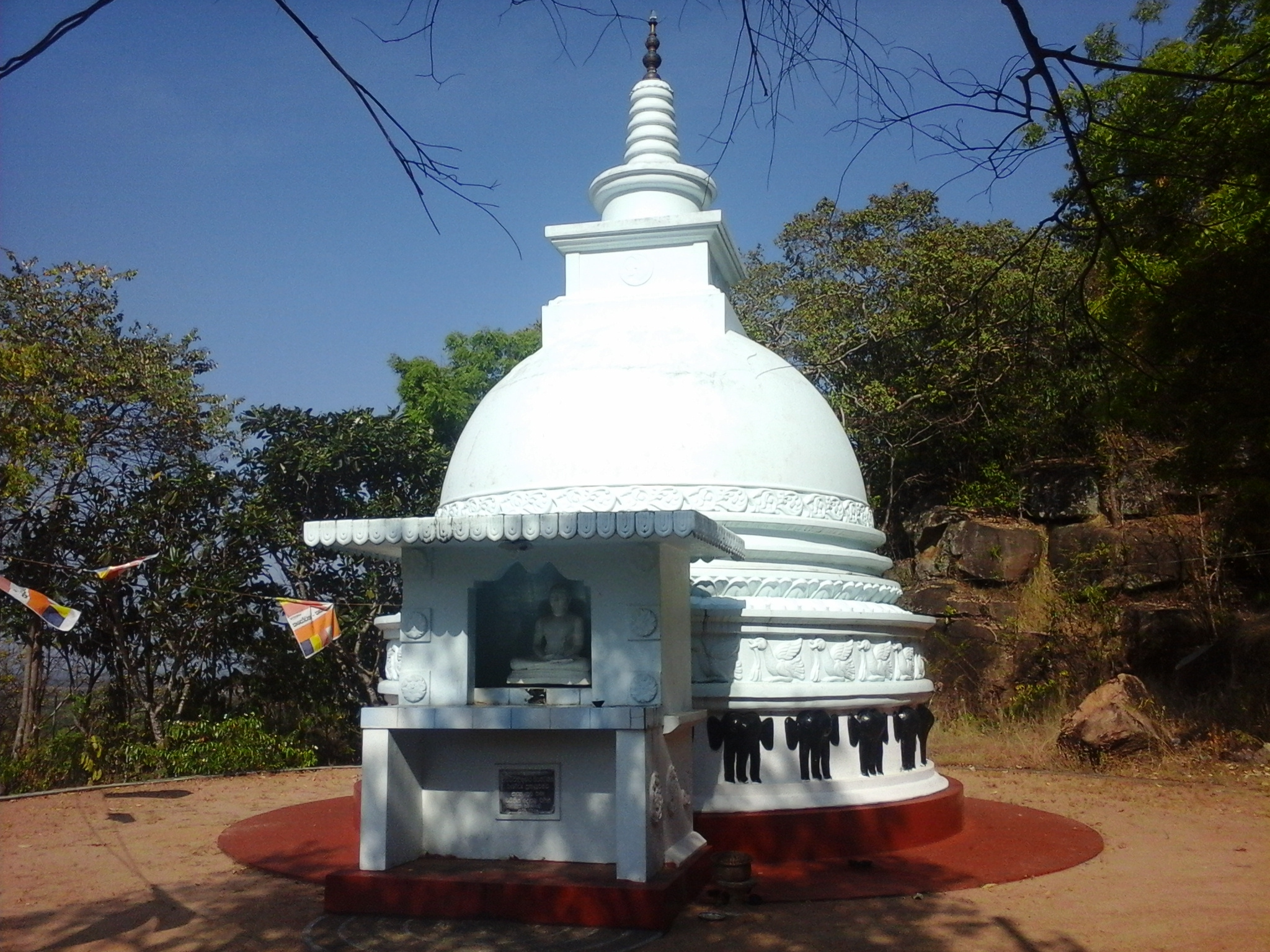

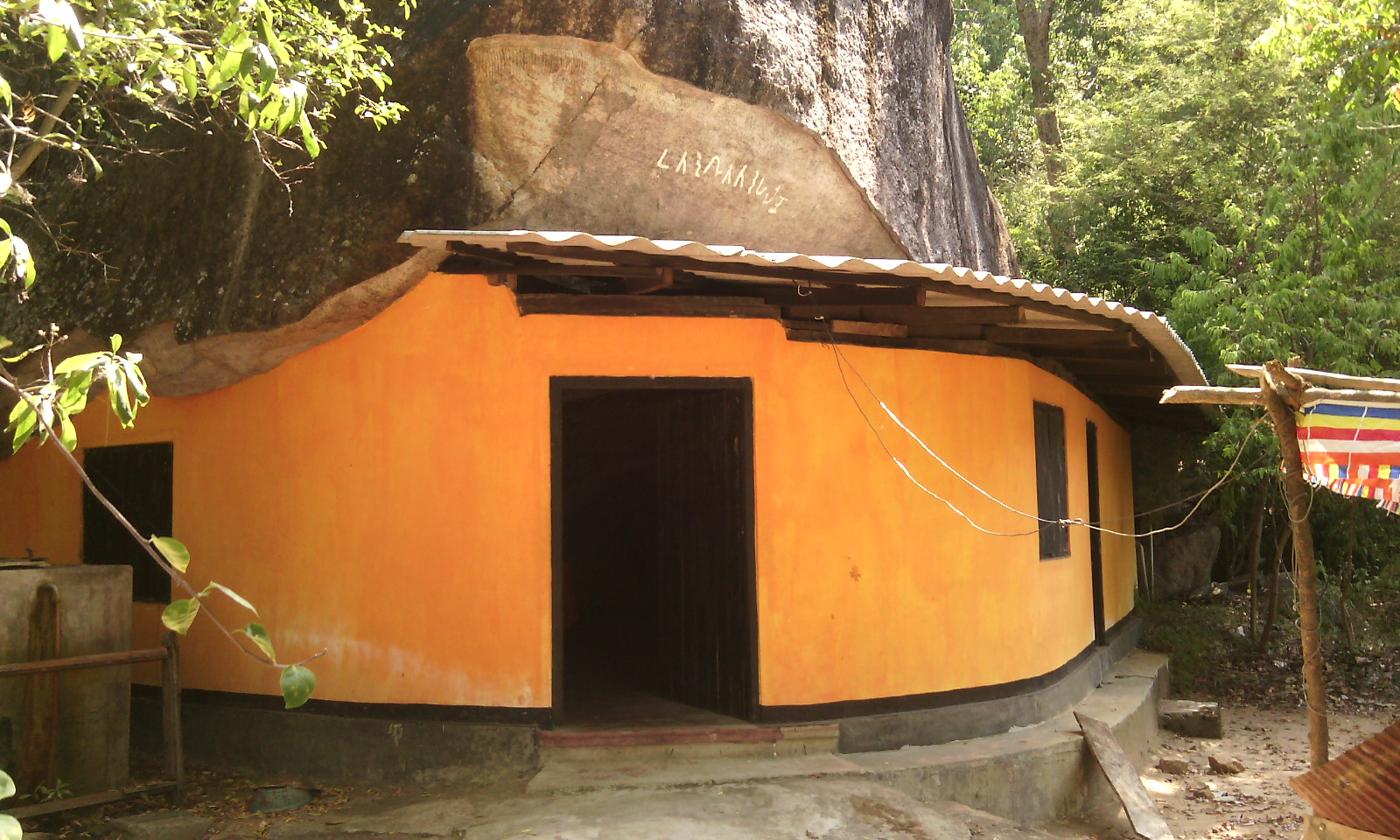

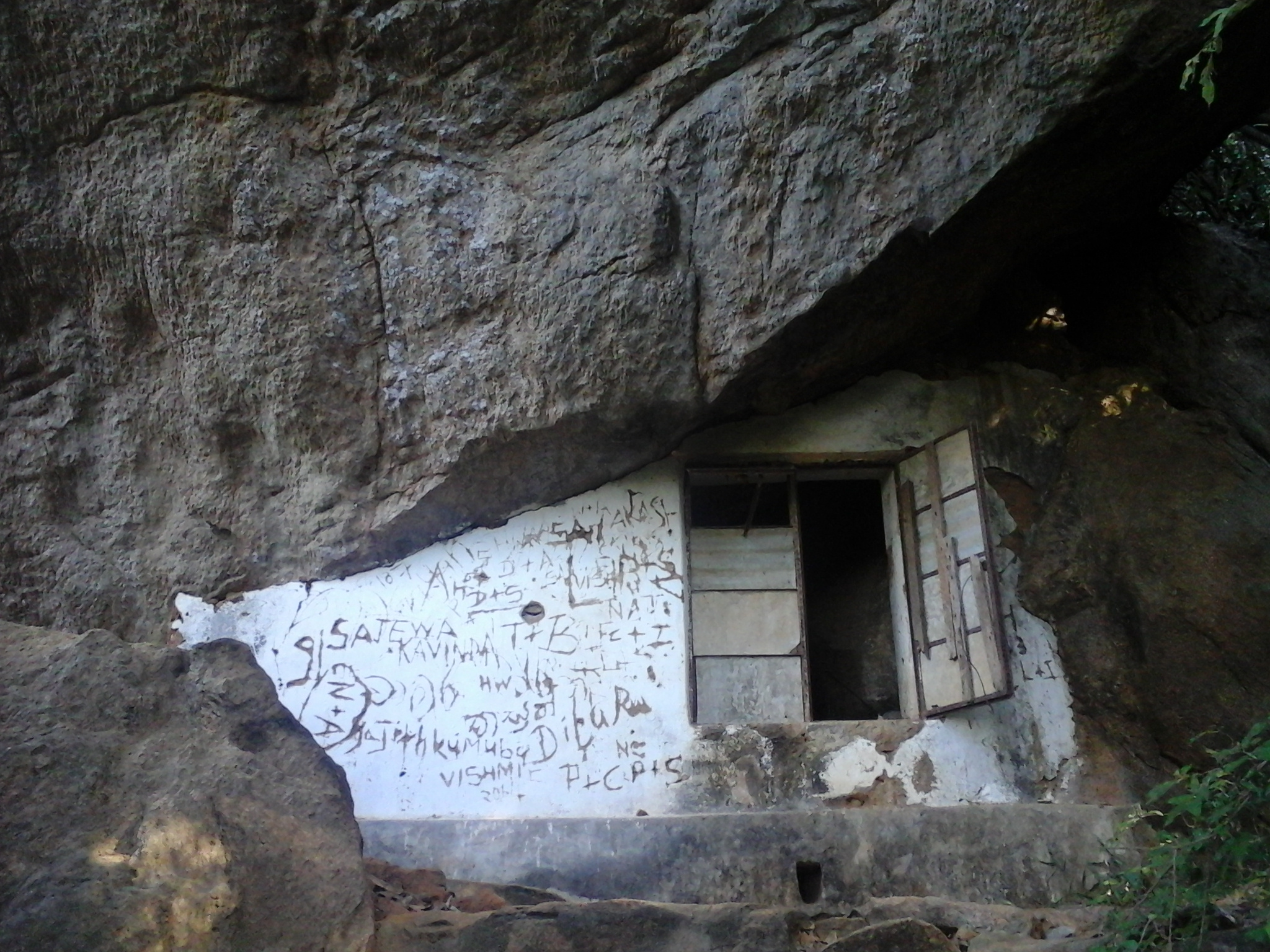

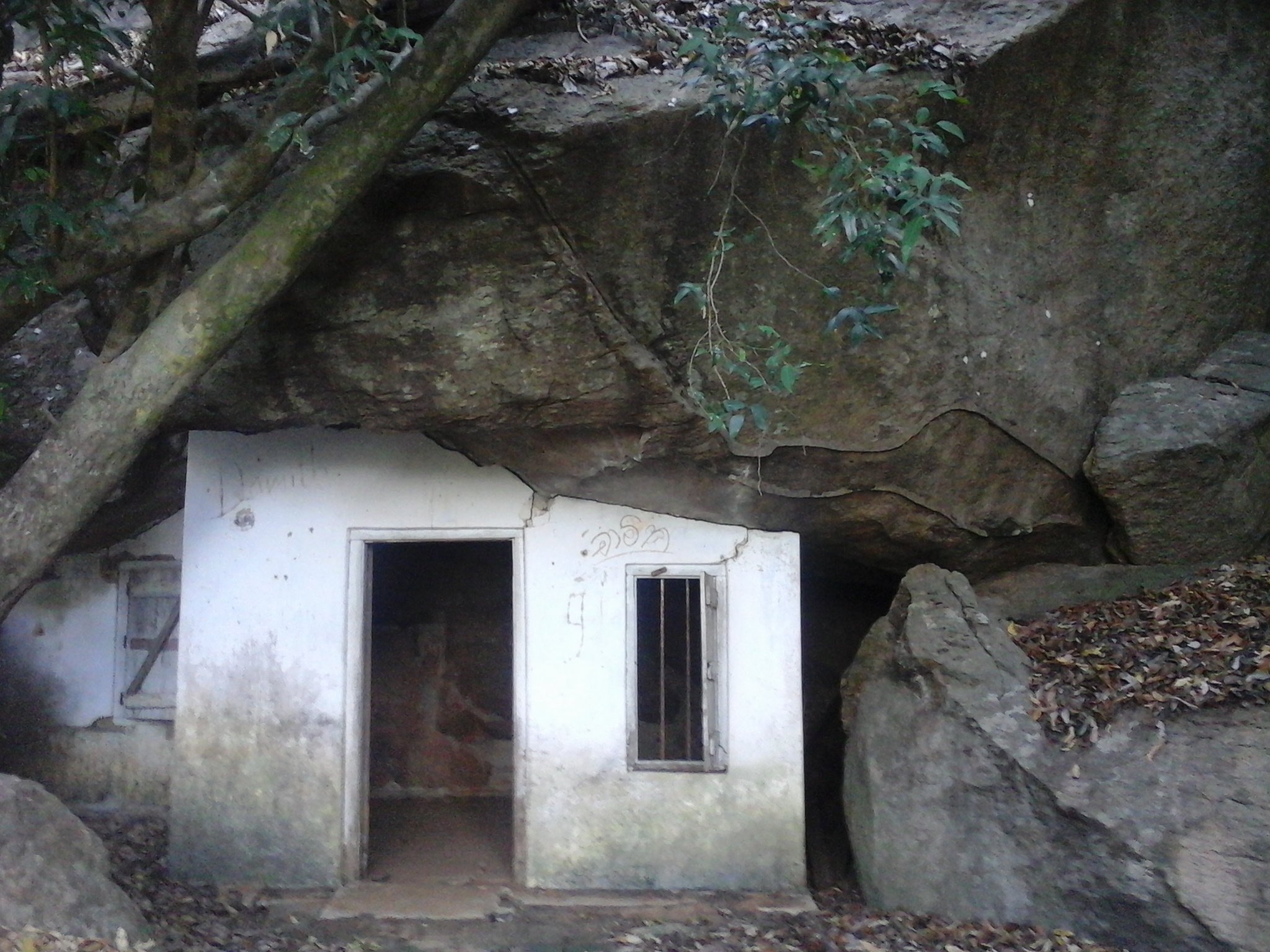

== Notes ==
- "Part I : Section (I) — General Government Notifications" (PDF). The Gazette of the Democratic Socialist Republic of Sri Lanka. 1895. 26 December 2014.
