= Padiyadora Raja Maha Vihara =

Buddhist temple in Padiyathalawa, Sri Lanka

- පදියදොර රජ මහා විහාරය
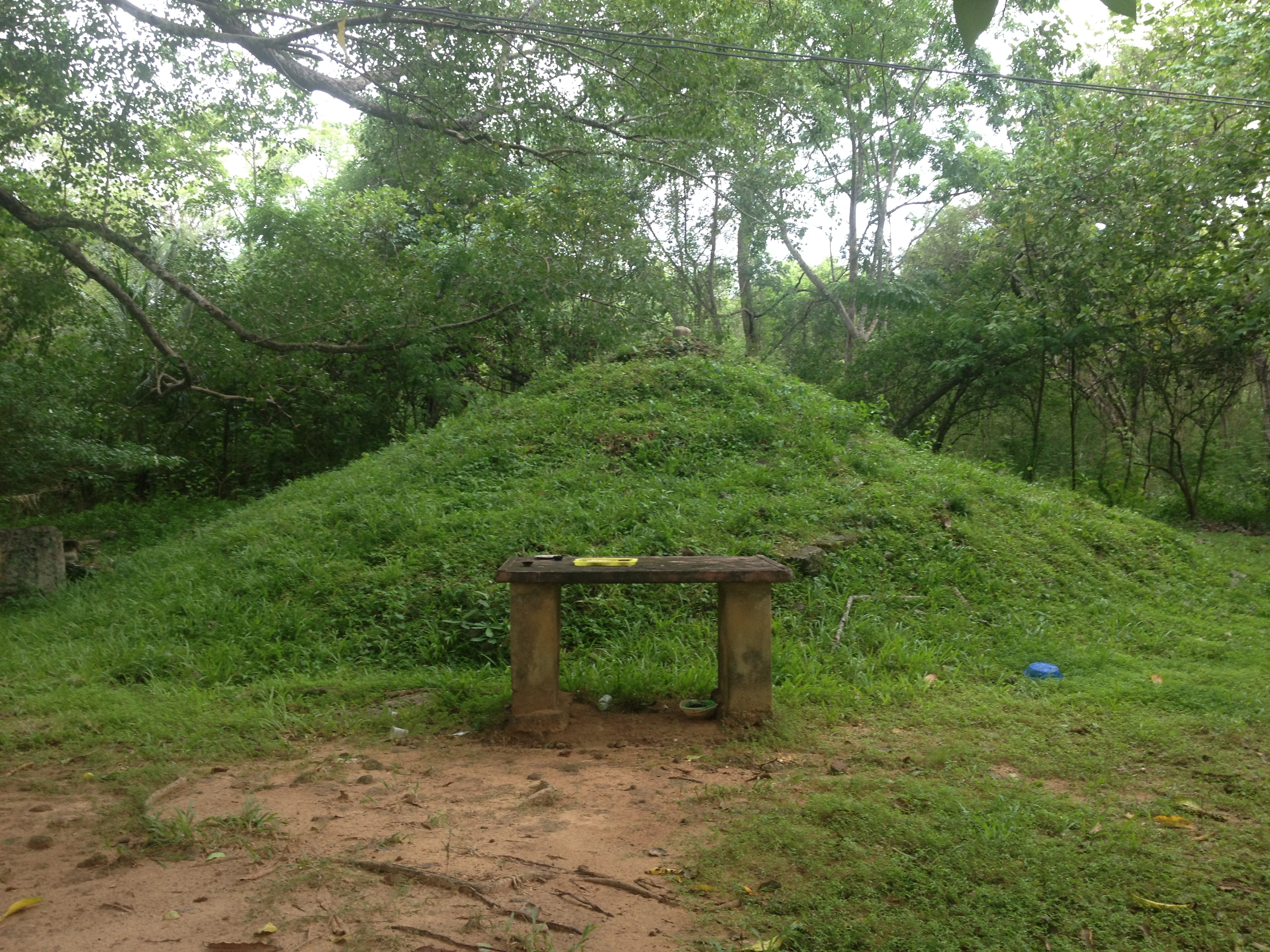
- The ruined Stupa

- Location within Sri Lanka

Religion
- Affiliation: Buddhism
- District: Ampara
- Province: Eastern Province

Location
- Location: Padiyathalawa
- Country: Sri Lanka
- Interactive map of Padiyadora Raja Maha Vihara
- Coordinates: 07°23′52.8″N 81°15′08.1″E

Architecture
- Type: Buddhist Temple
- Archaeological Protected Monument of Sri Lanka
- Designated: 10 October 2014

Padiyadora Raja Maha Vihara (also known as Padidora Raja Maha Vihara, Sinhala: පදියදොර රජ මහා විහාරය) is an ancient Buddhist temple in Padiyathalawa, Sri Lanka. The temple is located on Peradeniya – Chenkaladi - Badulla highway (A5) approximately 34 km (21 mi) distance from Mahiyangana town. The temple has been formally recognised by the Government as an archaeological site in Sri Lanka. The designation was declared on 10 October 2014 under the government Gazette number 1884.

== The temple ==
The temple, situated in the Padiyathalawa colony is believed to be constructed during the reign of king Kavan Tissa (205–161 BC). The Dagoba, which is now in the dilapidated state, resembles only a mound of earth and a short rubble wall has been built along its perimeter. Near to the Dagoba is a torso statue of Buddha which is about 4 feet (1.2 m) in height. The nearby building, marked with a Dharmachakra is believed to be an old Bhikkhu dwelling and now is in the ruined state. Remaining ruins of a rampart or probably a Bodhighara, a stone door frame and granite pillars can be identified within the temple premises. The Bodhi tree which is being highly venerated by the local Buddhists, is believed to be from one of saplings of Jaya Sri Maha Bodhi in Anuradhapura.
