= Keheliya Raja Maha Vihara =

Buddhist temple in Monaragala District, Sri Lanka

- කැහැලිය රජ මහා විහාරය
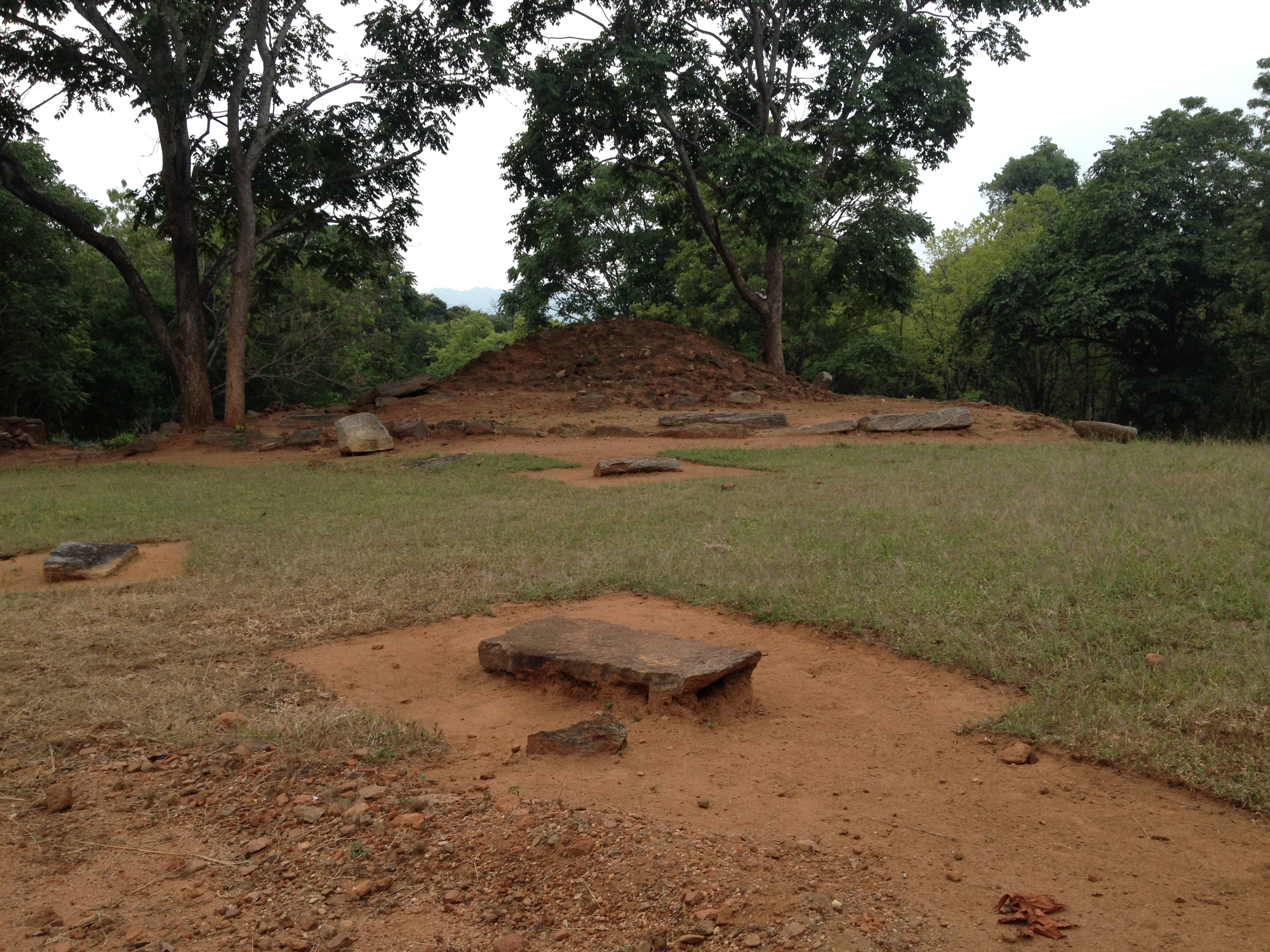
- The dilapidated Stupa and other ruins

Religion
- Affiliation: Buddhism
- District: Monaragala
- Province: Uva Province

Location
- Location: Handapanagala, Wellawaya
- Country: Sri Lanka
- Interactive map of Keheliya Raja Maha Vihara
- Coordinates: 06°39′55.8″N 81°07′37.4″E

Architecture
- Type: Buddhist Temple

Keheliya Raja Maha Vihara (Sinhala: කැහැලිය රජ මහා විහාරය) is an ancient Buddhist temple in Monaragala District, Sri Lanka. The temple is located in Handapanagala village approximately 11 km (6.8 mi) distance from Wellawaya town. The temple has been formally recognised by the Government as an archaeological site in Sri Lanka. The designation was declared on 22 November 2002 under the government Gazette number 1264.

== The temple ==
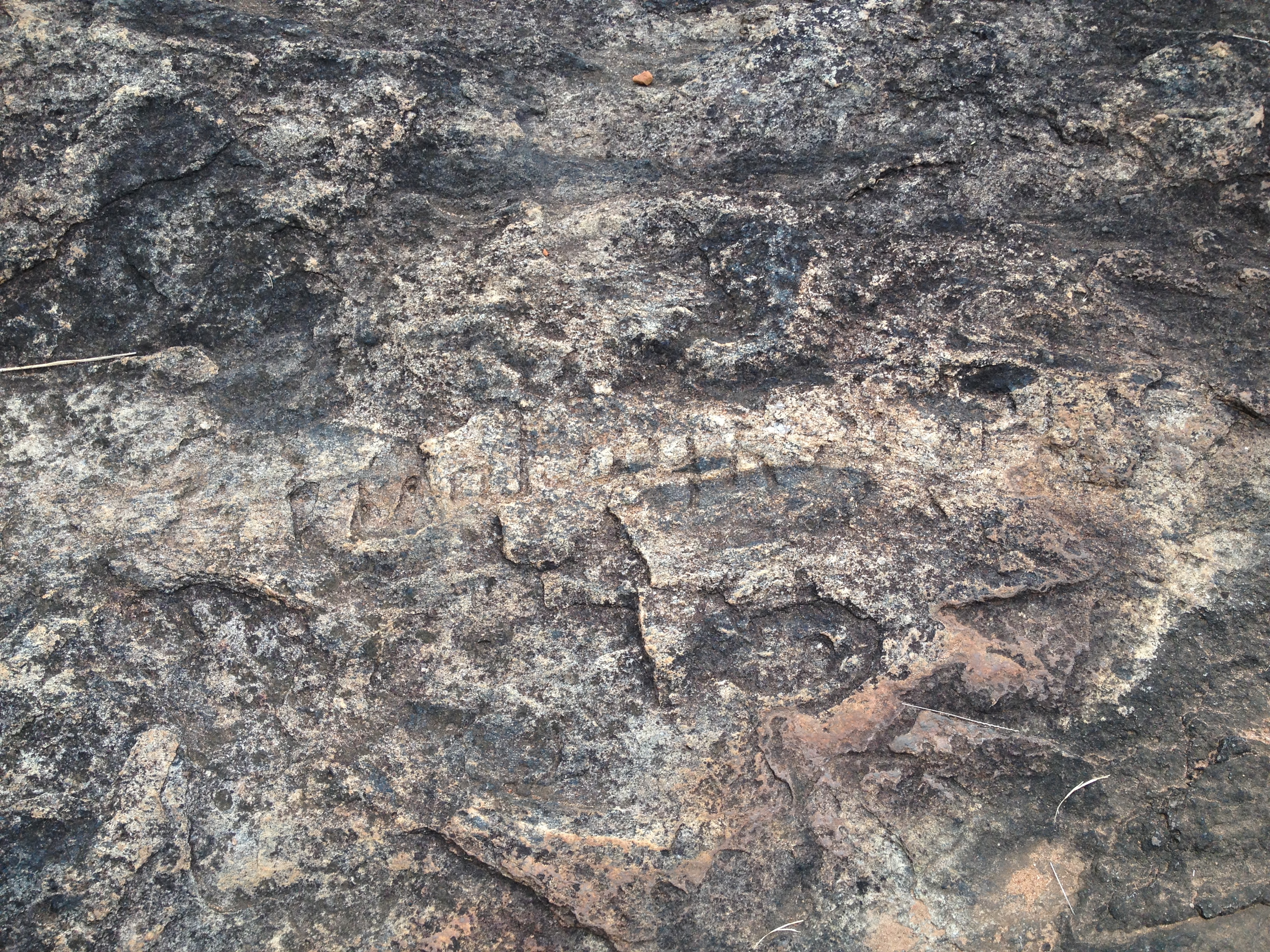
An inscription near to the rock curved steps

Located in Neluwagala Grama Niladari Division, the temple has been built on a small rock plateau close to the Handapanagala reservoir. The top of the rock plain is occupied by an ancient Stupa which is accessed by few steps, curved on the rock surface. The Stupa is now in almost dilapidated state, resembling only a mound of earth bounded with few rock boulders. Adjoining to the Stupa, a ruined image house is identified with number of other stone works including altars, monoliths, Balustrades (Korawak Gal), stone bases, Yantra stones and rock inscriptions. The rock inscriptions have been curved on the surface of the rock plateau and resemble early Brahmi scripts. The lower terrace, situated at the north of the Stupa contains large number of ruined stone columns including a pillar inscription. The ruins are believed to be belongs to the 3rd century BC of the King Devanpiya Tissa period (307 BC – 267 BC).
