= Galmaduwa Raja Maha Vihara, Ampara =

Buddhist temple in Galmaduwa, Sri Lanka

Galmaduwa Raja Maha Vihara
- ගල්මඩුව රජ මහා විහාරය
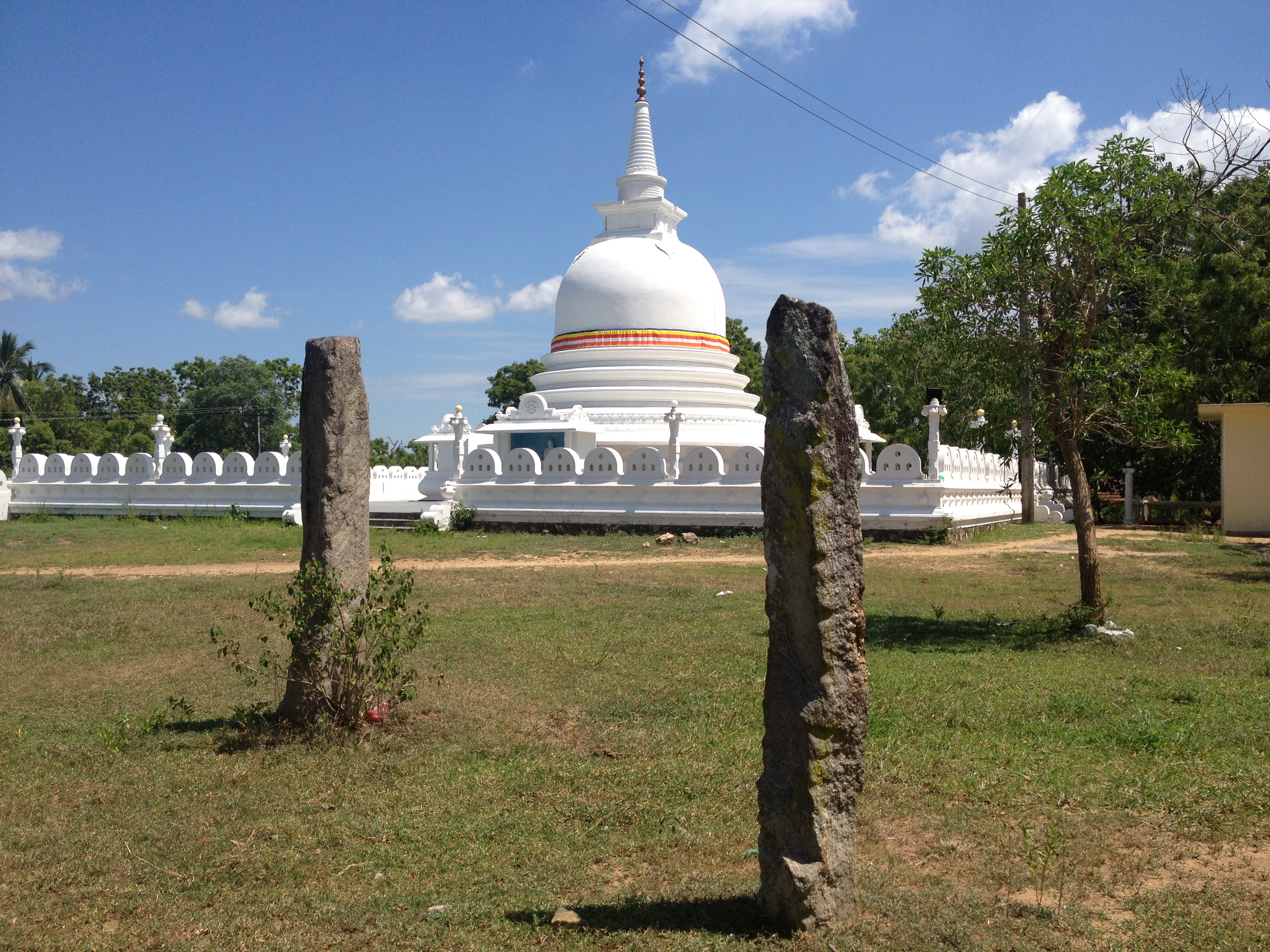
- The Stupa and ruined granite pillars at the Vihara premises

Religion
- Affiliation: Buddhism
- District: Ampara
- Province: Eastern Province

Location
- Location: Galmaduwa, Hingurana
- Country: Sri Lanka
- Interactive map of Galmaduwa Raja Maha Vihara
- Coordinates: 07°15′44.9″N 81°41′20.5″E

Architecture
- Type: Buddhist Temple
- Archaeological Protected Monument of Sri Lanka
- Designated: 26 December 2014

Galmaduwa Raja Maha Vihara (Sinhala: ගල්මඩුව රජ මහා විහාරය) is an ancient Buddhist temple in Galmaduwa, Sri Lanka. The temple is located on Hingurana – Ampara road approximately 6 km (3.7 mi) distance from Hingurana. It is believed that this temple complex was constructed during the reign of king Saddha Tissa (137 BC – 119 BC). The temple has been formally recognised by the Government as an archaeological site in Sri Lanka. The designation was declared on 26 December 2014 under the government Gazette number 1895.

== The temple ==
With the beginning of the Gal Oya development programme, carried out around the Ampara region, the ruined temple complex at Galmaduwa was found out. After the discovery of the ruined site, the temple was re-established and developed as a modern Vihara complex. Due to that many buildings stand today at the temple are recent constructions but some of the ancient structures such as granite pillars, Sandakada pahana, Korawak gal, Chatra stones and foundations of buildings still can be seen within the premises. The Dagoba of the ancient temple is almost in the dilapidated state, resembling only a small mount of earth.
