= Muwangala Raja Maha Vihara =

Ancient Buddhist temple in Muwangala, Sri Lanka

- මුවංගල රජ මහා විහාරය
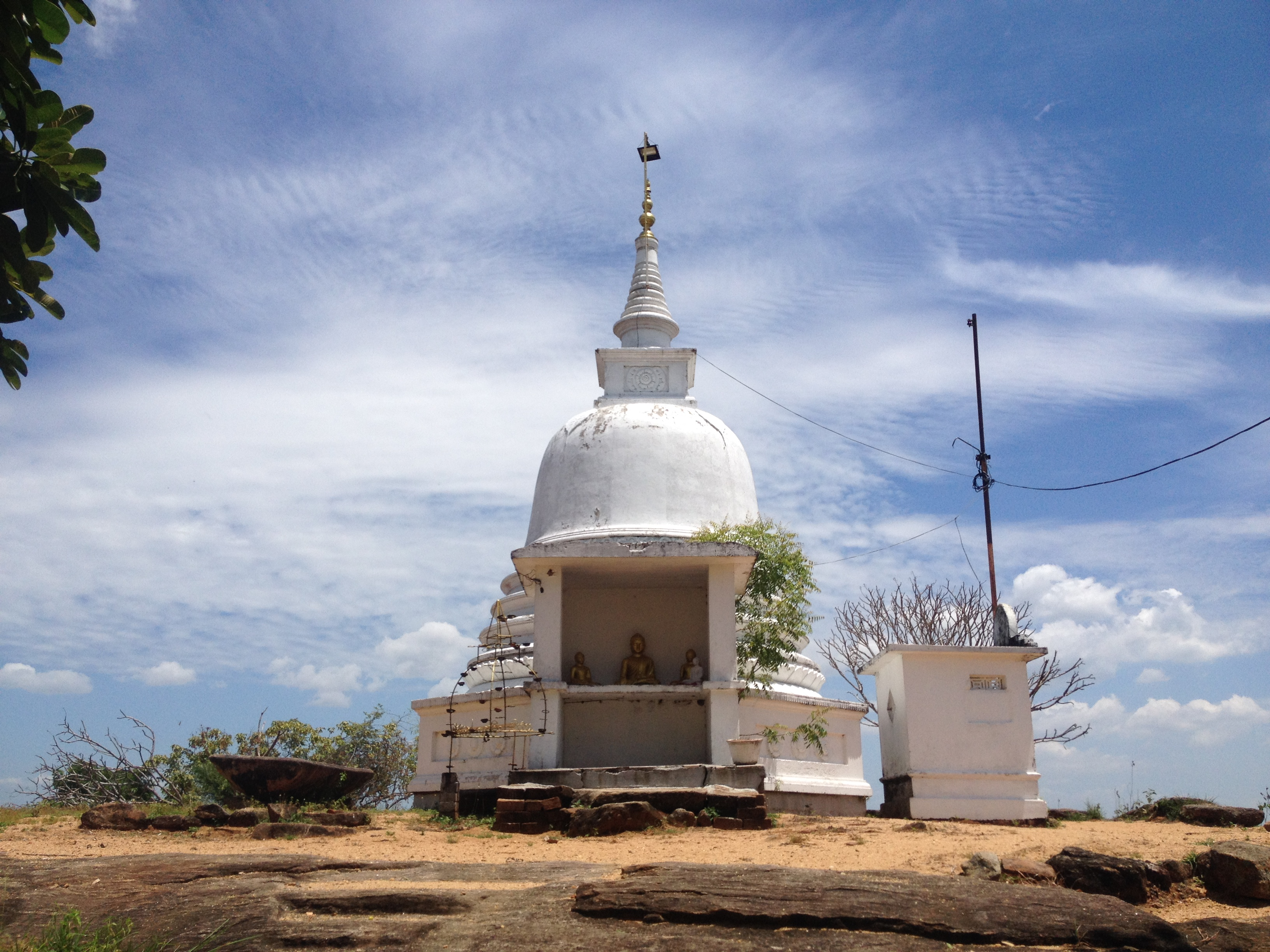
- The Stupa of Muwangala Raja Maha Vihara

Religion
- Affiliation: Buddhism
- District: Ampara
- Province: Eastern Province

Location
- Location: Muwangala, Hingurana
- Country: Sri Lanka
- Interactive map of Muwangala Raja Maha Vihara
- Coordinates: 07°15′00.7″N 81°39′50.0″E

Architecture
- Type: Buddhist Temple
- Archaeological Protected Monument of Sri Lanka
- Designated: 26 December 2014

Muwangala Raja Maha Vihara, also known as Digamadulle Purana Raja Maha Vihara, (Sinhala: මුවංගල රජ මහා විහාරය හෝ දිගාමඩුල්ලේ පුරාණ රජ මහා විහාරය) is an ancient Buddhist temple in Muwangala, Sri Lanka. The temple is located on Hingurana – Ampara road approximately 3 km (1.9 mi) from Hingurana. The temple has been formally recognised by the Government as an archaeological site in Sri Lanka. The designation was declared on 26 December 2014 under the government Gazette number 1895.

== The temple ==
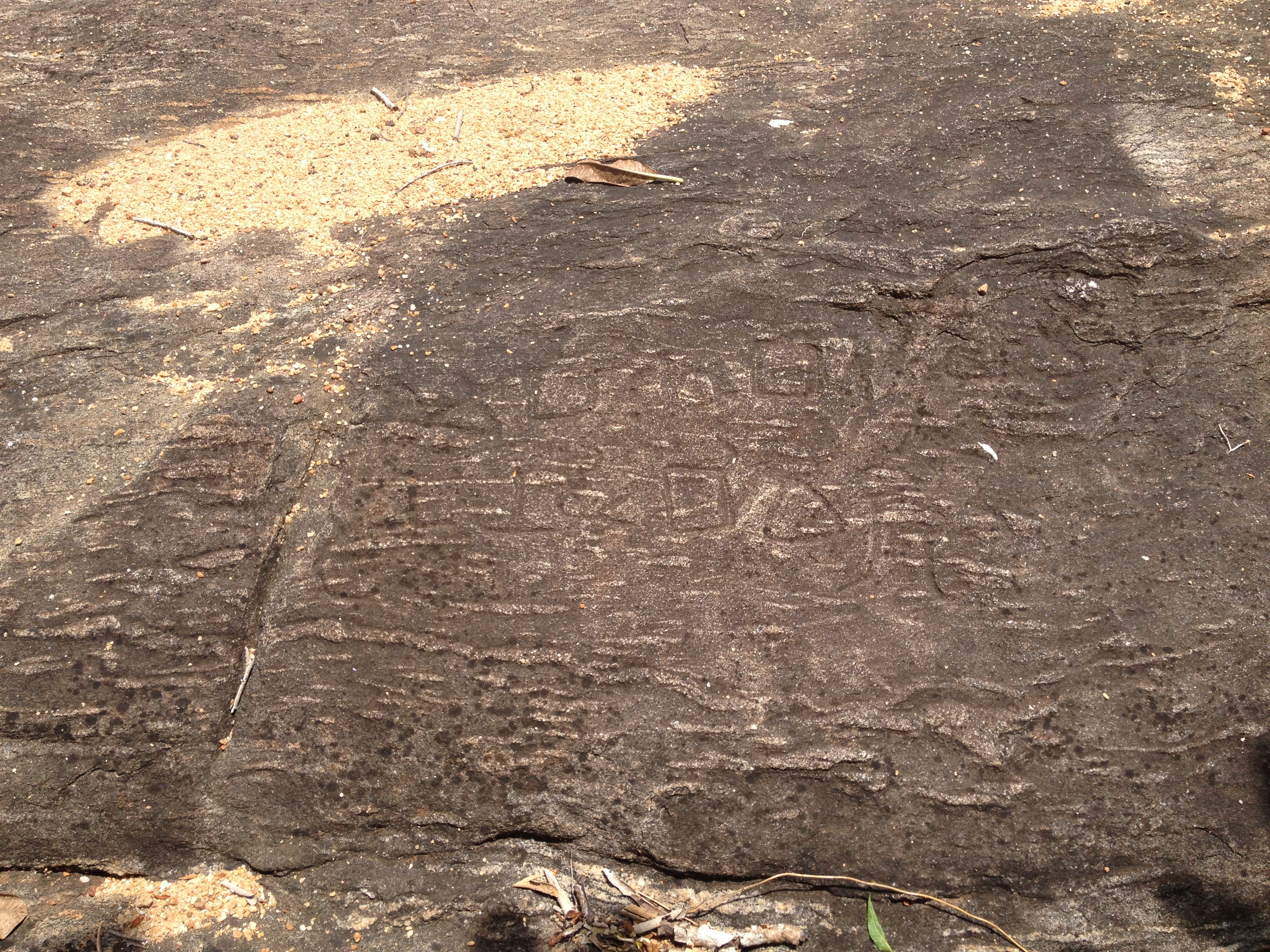
A 3rd century inscription, engraved on the rock surface near to the Stupa. In where the period of reign is not indicated. It mentions a grant to a temple by viceroy a named Kodini.

The temple complex at Muwangala has been constructed on two rocky outcrops between Ampara and Hingurana. The modern buildings of the temple are situated at the lower ground of the mountain and the ruined structures of the ancient temple are scattered on the top of rocky plateau. Among the ancient structures, Sri Pathul Gal (slabs of Buddha footprint), an Asanaghara, pieces of Sandakada pahana, plight of steps, rock inscriptions, a drip ledged cave, bases of buildings and pillars can be identified. Before the construction of Buddha statues, people used various objects such as Asanaghara and Sri Pathul Gal to represent Buddha. Therefore, the presence of Sri Pathul Gal or Asanaghara in a temple is considered by archaeologists as an indicator that the temple was there before the Buddha statues were built in the country.
