= Thanthirimale =

Coordinates: 8°32′N 80°16′E

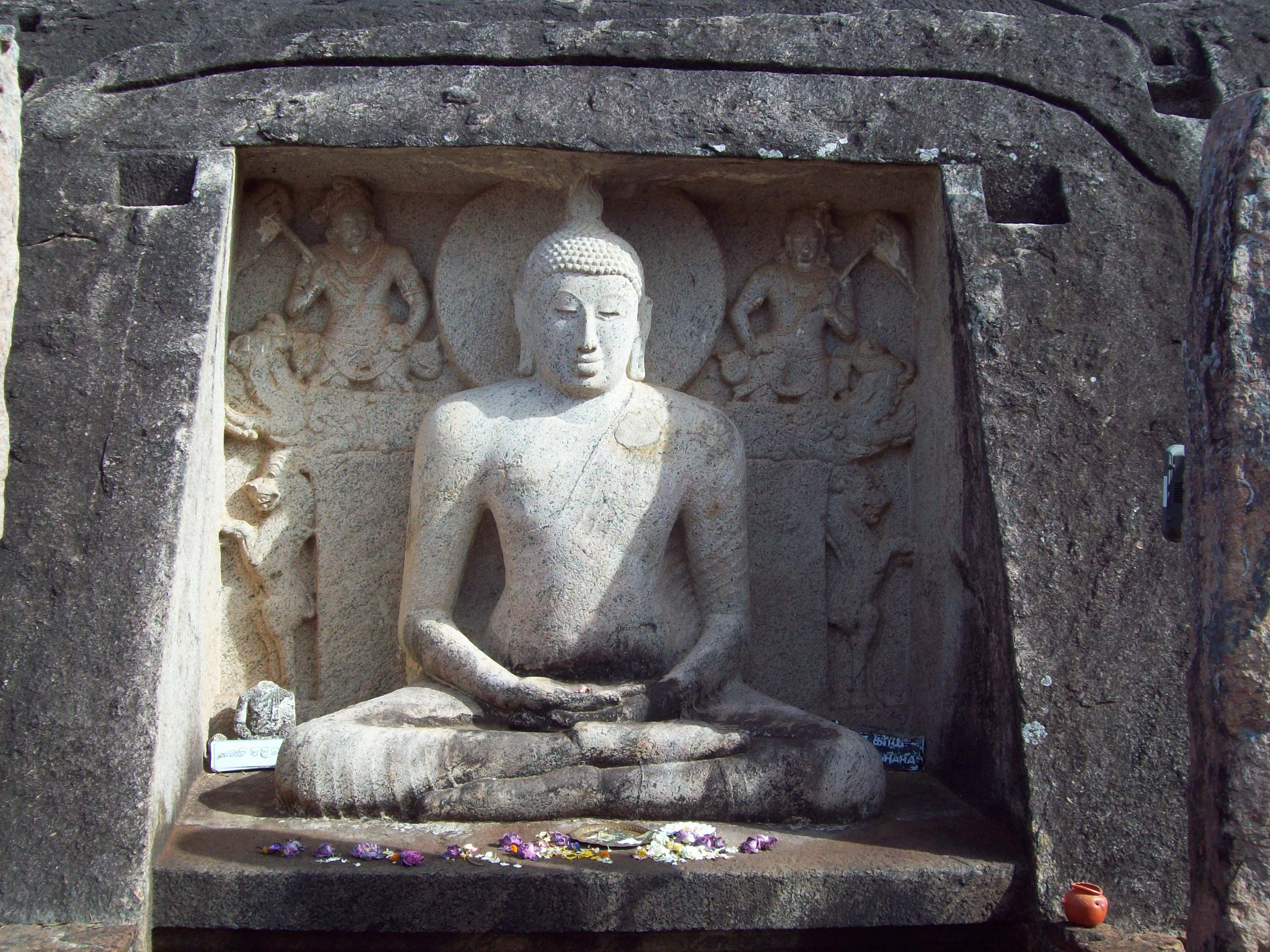
Samadhi Buddha Statue at Thanthirimale Raja Maha Vihara

Thanthirimale (also spelled as Tantirimale) is an old village in the Anuradhapura District of Sri Lanka. It is located approximately 40 km northwest of the Anuradhapura city. The village is known for the ancient Buddhist temple Thanthirimale Raja Maha Vihara, situated in a nearby rock-covered area.

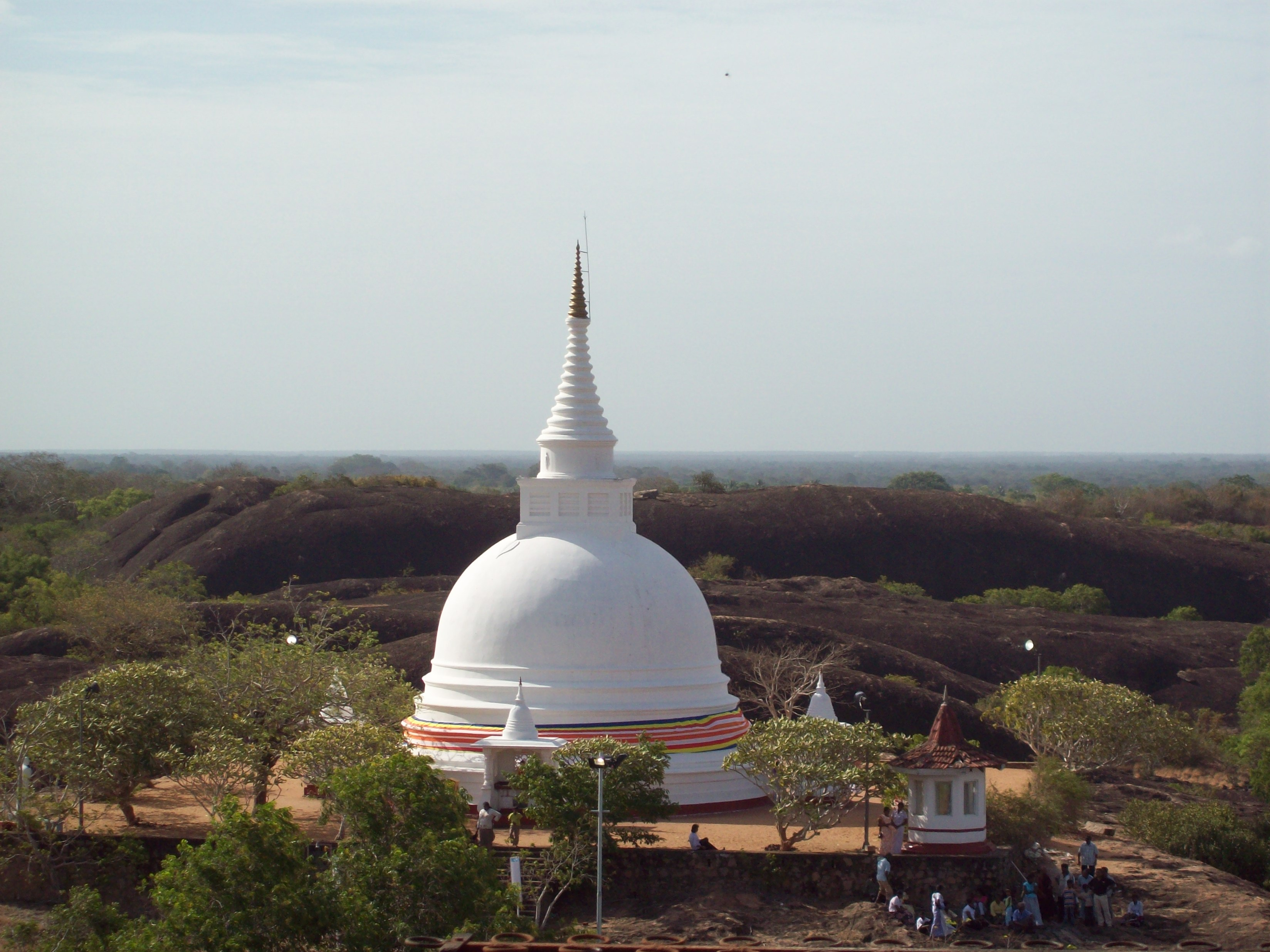
Thanthirimale New Stupa

The temple and the junction appear to be the most important centre in the village. This temple, which was built in the third century BC has a historical value. When the Jaya Sri Maha Bodhi was brought from India to Sri Lanka, one night along the way to Anuradhapura, the pot containing the sapling was kept at Thanthirimale. It is believed that there was one branch separately grown from the pot, was planted at that village to remember the incident. Hence, some believe that this may be the first Sri Maha Bhodi plant in Sri Lanka. The Bo Tree is placed on top of a large stony layer which may protect the tree up to now.

This place was unidentified till the beginning of the 19th century, and in the 1960s the temple was reestablished by Buddhist monks. The temple and surrounding area are full of ruins, including two stone statues and several stone ponds. The site also includes ancient caves and paintings. There is an archaeological museum at Thanthirimale.

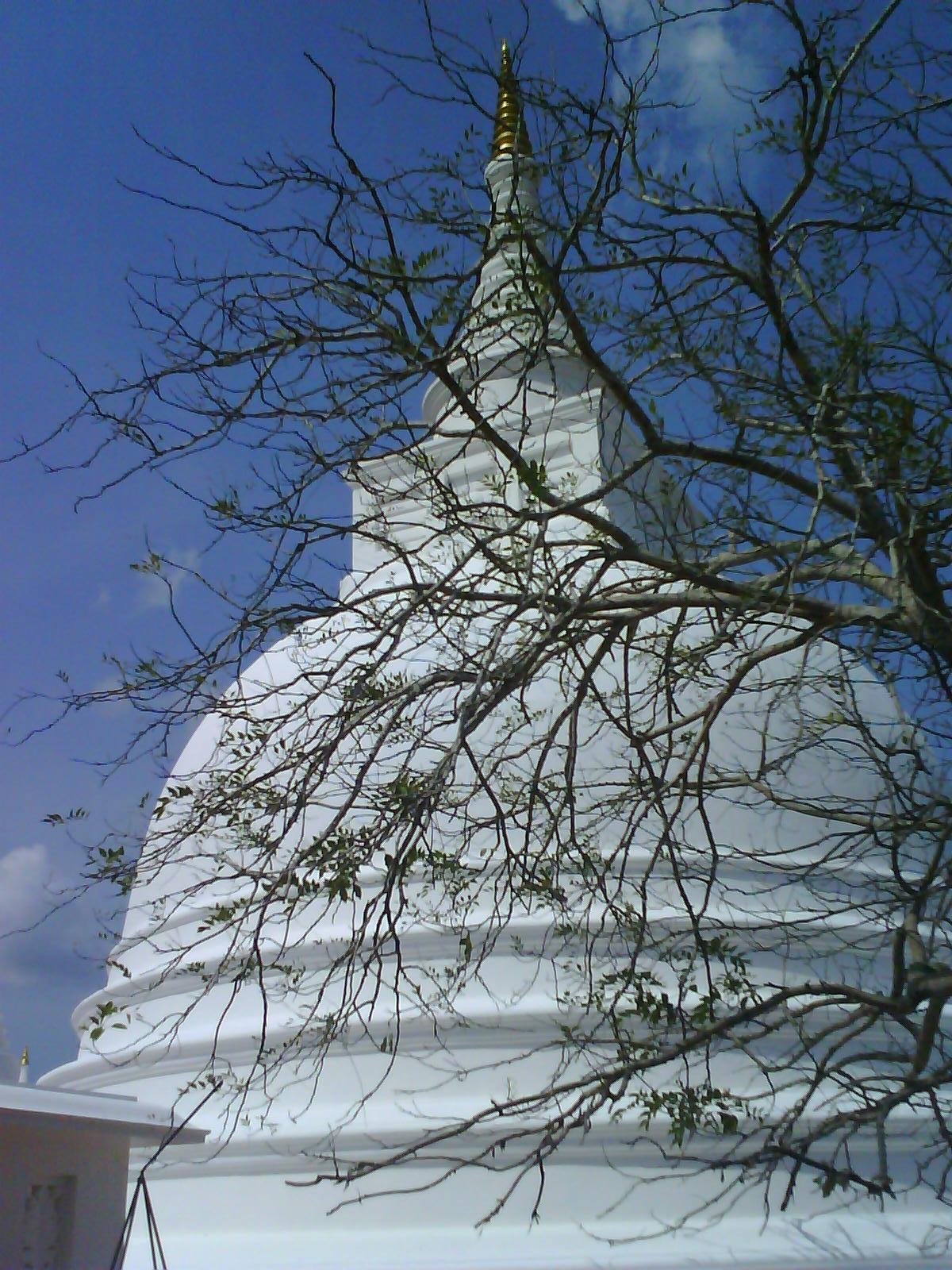
Thanthirimale Stupa
