= Devanapatissa Vipassana International Meditation Centre =

Devanapathis International Samatha-vipassana Meditation Center
- Formation: 1991
- Type: Organization of Buddhist monasteries
- Purpose: Spiritual Development
- Location: Pallekele, Sri Lanka
- Region served: Worldwide
- Members: practicing Buddhists
- Founder: Walane Amatha Gavesi Thero

Devanapathis International Samatha-vipassana Meditation Center; commonly known as Pallekele Meditation Center is Buddhist monastery in Kandy, Sri Lanka. It was founded by late Ven. Walane Amatha Gavesi Thero in 1991. The monastery is located in old Gam Uadawa premises in Pallekele, around 8 Kilometers from the Kandy town.
