= Suvisuddharamaya =

Sri Suvisuddharamaya Temple (also listed as Sri Suvisuddharamaya) is a Buddhist temple in Manakkulama (Kakkapalliya area), in Sri Lanka’s North Western Province. Directory listings place it in the Puttalam District.
