= Kuragala =

Archaeological site in Sri Lanka

Kuragala Ancient Buddhist Monastery
- කූරගල පුරාණ බෞද්ධ ආරාම සංකීර්ණය
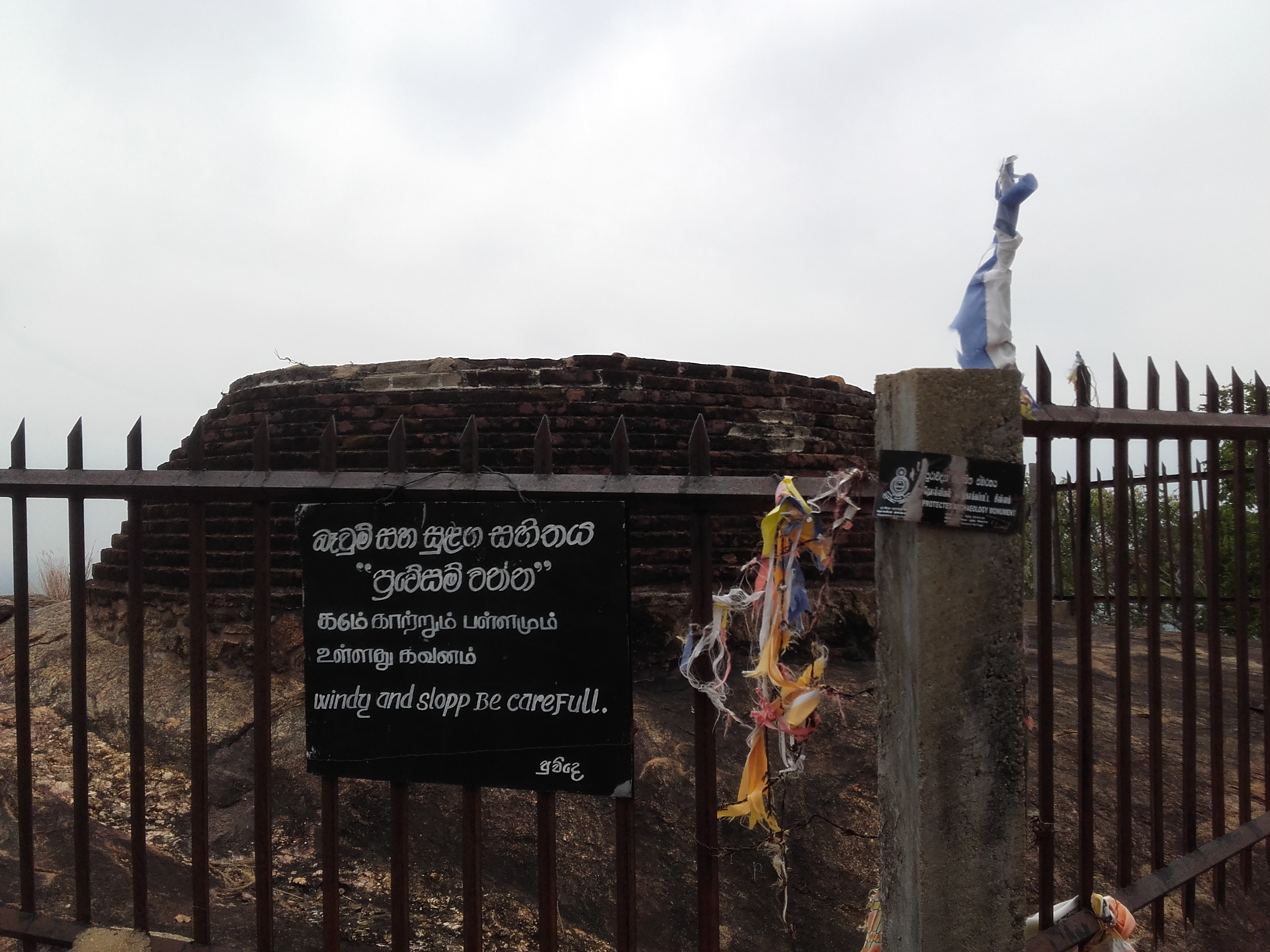
- A view of Akasha Chaitya at Kuragala

Religion
- Affiliation: Buddhism
- District: Ratnapura
- Province: Sabaragamuwa Province

Location
- Location: Balangoda
- Country: Sri Lanka
- Interactive map of Kuragala Ancient Buddhist Monastery
- Coordinates: 06°37′44.4″N 80°51′51.9″E

Architecture
- Type: Buddhist Temple
- Style: Cave temple
- Completed: circa 20 century AD

Kuragala (Sinhala: කූරගල) is a pre-historic archaeological site consisting of an early human settlement during the late Pleistocene period and ruins of ancient Buddhist Cave temple complex, dating back to the 2nd century BC, in Balangoda, Sri Lanka. The temple complex is located on the Balangoda - Kaltota road (B38) approximately 24 km (15 mi) distance from the Balangoda town. The site has been formally recognised by the Government as an archaeological reserve in Sri Lanka. Kuragala is considered as the oldest archaeological site found in the Intermediate Zone.

== History ==
=== Prehistoric evidences ===
According to the archaeological evidences found, Kuragala area had been used by humans belonging to the pre-historic period. From the excavations, archaeologists found stone tools, fossilized bone fragments and remains of a human skeleton which is believed to be aged more than 8,000 years. Investigations further revealed that the humans lived in Kuragala may had close links with the coastal areas as it found the remnants of seashells and shells of clams. Recent studies done in the Kuragala Kaltota Diyawinna area have revealed that beside the hunting, they had also engaged in agricultural activities as well.

=== Buddhist monastery ===
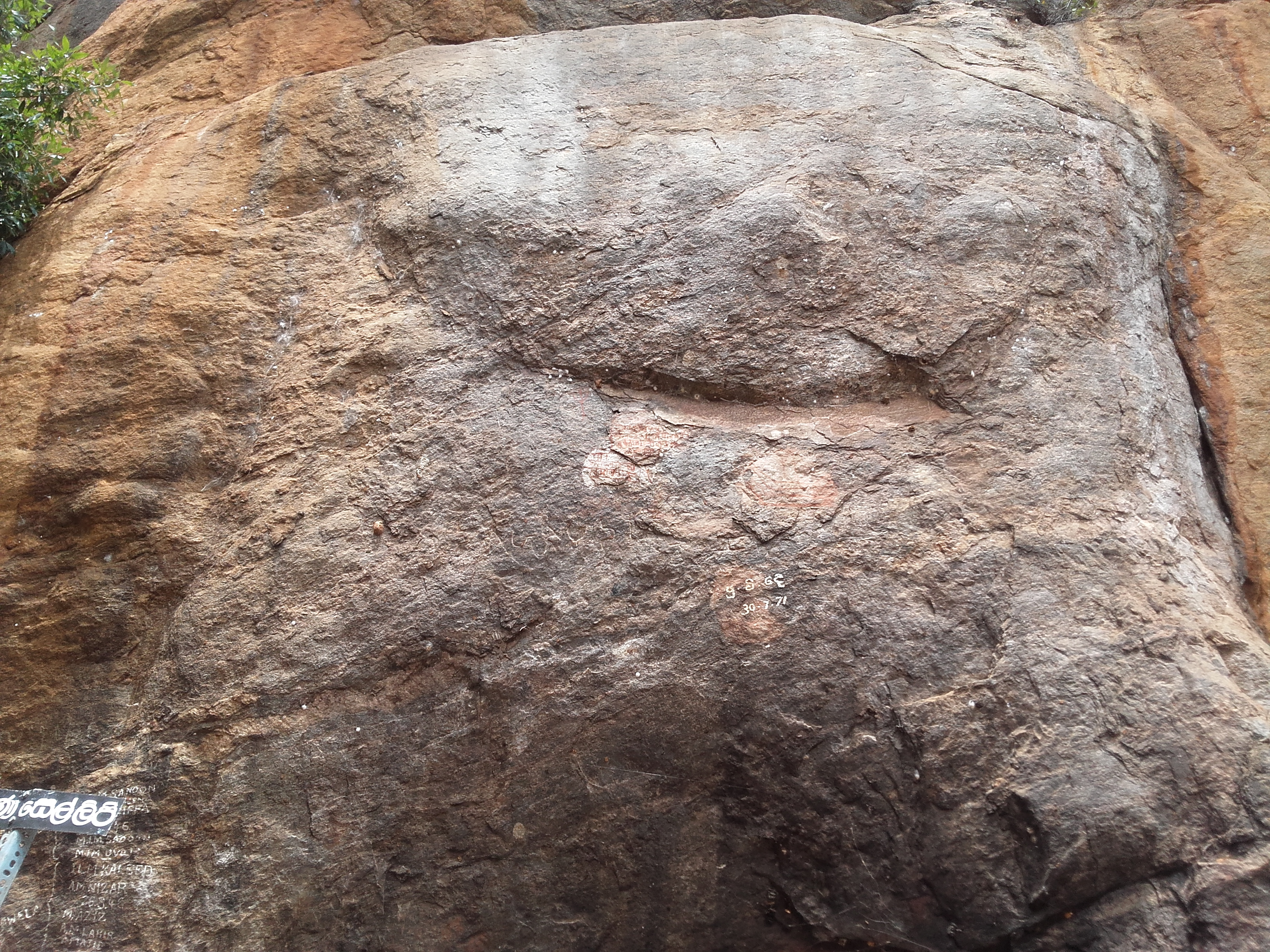
Kuragala inscription (No. 1). Written in early Brahmin scripts and old Sinhala language, it is belonged to the 2-1 centuries BC.

The extensive investigations, carried out by the archaeological department at the Kuragala, uncovered evidences that the caves at the site were using as a Buddhist monastery during the period between 3rd century BC and first century AD. An archaeological report on Kuragala area, published by C.H. Collins in 1932, documents about the two cave shelters and 2nd century BC Brahmi inscriptions as well as about the carved stone lintels, stairways and platforms, located at the foot of the Kuragala brae (Budugala area). From eye copies, C. H Collins published his interpretations of Kuragala inscriptions in JRASCB, XXXII, 1932. These inscriptions were reread, and republished in Inscriptions of Ceylon Vol. I by the archaeological department.

Researches done by Sri Lankan archaeologists and epigraphers have established that, inscribed cave shelters were made for Buddhist monks by donors as religious donations. Caves provide shelter to them during the annual rainy season retreat as prescribed in Theravada Buddhist tradition. Existence of dripledged caves in a site indicate that they were inhabited by Bhikkhus during the past period and epigraphs further reveal the names of donors who donate the prepared caves to them.

At the summit of the Kuragala is a brick built Stupa dating to 1971 which is now an archaeologically protected monument. The Stupa is considered belongs to the tradition of Akasa Chaithya which type of Stupa were built since 7th century CE to serve as communication beacons giving directions.

=== Muslim shrine ===
According to the book written by Jailani Mosque, it is claimed that there are several writings in Arabic, and the direction of the Kaaba is shown in the form of a mihrab cut into the rock and a tombstone with the words "Darvesh Mohiyadin Darvesh", and the remains found when excavating to build the mosque were laid to rest on the southern side of the mosque with the date Hijri 715. It claims Hituwangala to be "Kai Adi Malai" (palm print rock), as the saint is said to have placed his palm print in sandalwood paste. While present structures were built in the 20th century, Arabic inscriptions and a Dervish tombstone suggest the shrine's ancient Muslim use.

In 2013, at the behest of Buddhist Nationalist organizations such as the BBS, the then Defence Secretary Gotabaya Rajapakshe ordered the removal of additional structures, such as administration offices, pilgrim rest areas, and tea shops, within the archaeological zone. The demolition was carried out by members of the Civil Defense Corps under the direction of the Defense Ministry, but the mosque and the tombs remains.
