= Padiyathalawa =

Padiyathalawa පදියතලාව
- Town
- Location within Sri Lanka Location within South Asia Location within Asia
- Coordinates: 7°24′12.9″N 81°14′37.0″E
- Country: Sri Lanka
- Province: Eastern Province
- District: Ampara District
- Divisional Secretariat: Padiyathalawa Divisional Secretariat
- Time zone: UTC+5:30 (Sri Lanka Time)

Padiyathalawa is a small town in Ampara District, Sri Lanka.

== Attractions ==
- Padiyadora Raja Maha Vihara is an ancient Buddhist temple located close to the Padiyathalawa town. The temple is an archaeologically protected monument.
- Wahawa hot water springs.
- Nawinna Rajamaha Wiharaya is an ancient temple situated 5km away from the town.
