= Senanayake Aramaya =

The Senanayake Aramaya is a temple situated on the Main Chilaw Road, at Madampe, Sri Lanka which houses The Sacred Hair Relics of Buddha.

This temple at Madampe was built by two aristocratic philanthropists Gate Mudaliar L. M. W. Senanayake and D. M. W. Senanayake. They built the Sambuddha Jayanthi stupa to commemorate the 2500th Buddha Jayanti.

The relics of the Buddha and Arahant theras and from many parts of the world were brought to Senanayake Aramaya. The Buddha Jayanti stupa is manmade out of solid granite and took 10 years for completion.

A sapling of the Jaya Sri Maha Bodhi was planted in the premises of the Senanayake Aramaya. The Senanayake Aramaya is managed and maintained by the Senanayake Aramaya Trust.

In addition to the Hair Relics offered by the living Buddha, to the two brothers Tapassu and Bhalluka, these are the other items enshrined in the stupa:

- Sacred Buddha relics obtained from a stupa in the Swat Valley.
- Sacred Buddha relics obtained from the Dharma Kalavan stupa at Gandhara.
- Sacred ash relics obtained from the funeral pyre of the Buddha, wrapped in a gold plate.
- Two sacred relics of Arhants Majjhima and Kantipura, who participated in the 3rd Council held during the reign of King Asoka.
- A few sacred Buddha relics obtained from Mir Pur Khas Stupa, which belongs to the Kanishka period.
- Two caskets containing sacred relics.
