= Uhana =

Uhana උහන உஹன
- Town
- Location within Sri Lanka
- Coordinates: 7.3630°N 81.6353°E
- Province: Eastern Province
- District: Ampara District
- Divisional Secretariat: Ampara Division
- Time zone: UTC+5:30 (Sri Lanka Standard Time)
- Postal Code: 32060

Uhana (Sinhala: උහන, Tamil: உஹன) is a town in the Ampara District, Eastern Province of Sri Lanka.

Uhana is located 418 km (260 mi) east of Colombo and 10 km (6.2 mi) north of Ampara. The town is located on the Ampara-Oya road (A27). Uhana Maha Vidyalaya has situated in here.

== Education ==
=== Government Schools ===
- Uhana Maha Vidyalaya
- Uhana Kanishta Vidyalaya
- Uhana Thissapura Vidyalaya
- Udayagiri Vidyalaya

=== International Schools ===
- Global Life International School - Uhana
