= Mahaoya =

Mahaoya மகா ஓயா මහඔය
- Town
- Location within Sri Lanka
- Coordinates: 7.5460°N 81.3774°E
- Country: Sri Lanka
- Province: Eastern
- District: Ampara
- Time zone: UTC+5:30 (Sri Lanka Standard Time)
- Postal Code: 32070

Mahaoya (Sinhala: මහඔය, lit. 'Great River', Tamil: மகா ஓயா) is a town in the Ampara District, Eastern Province of Sri Lanka. It is located in 64 km (40 mi) north-west of Ampara, at the intersection of the Peradeniya-Badulla-Chenkalady Highway (A5) and the Manampitiya - Aralaganwila - Maduru Oya Road (B502).

Mahaoya has hot springs which are located about 2 km (1.2 mi) away from the town, the springs are considered the hottest springs in Sri Lanka.

== See also ==
- Mahaoya Divisional Secretariat
- Maduru Oya National Park
