= The Sri Lanka Gazette =

Government gazette of Sri Lanka

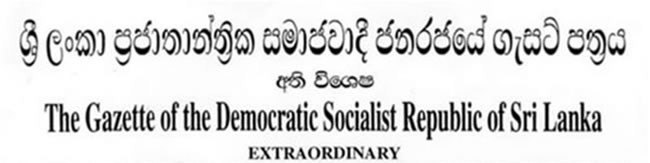
- Header of The Sri Lanka Gazette (Extraordinary)
- Type: Gazette
- Publisher: Government of Sri Lanka; Department of Government Printing
- Founded: 1802
- Language: English, Sinhala, Tamil
- Headquarters: 118, Dr. Danister De Silva Mawatha, Colombo 8, Sri Lanka
- Website: documents.gov.lk

The Sri Lanka Gazette, officially The Gazette of the Democratic Socialist Republic of Sri Lanka, (Sinhala: ශ්‍රී ලංකා ප්‍රජාතාන්ත්‍රික සමාජවාදී ජනරජයේ ගැසට් පත්‍රය, romanized: Shrī Laṁkā Prajātāntrika Samājavādī Janarajayē Gæsaṭ Patraya; Tamil: இலங்கை ஜனநாயக சோசலிச குடியரசின் வர்த்தமானி, romanized: Ilaṅkai Jaṉanāyaka Cōcalica Kuṭiyaraciṉ Varttamāṉi) is a public journal of the Government of Sri Lanka. It prints certain statutory notices from the government. Modeled after the Oxford Gazette, the Sri Lanka Gazette is the oldest surviving newspaper in Sri Lanka, having been published continuously since 1802. Unlike other newspapers, it does not cover general news or have a large circulation. It is printed by the Department of Government Printing.

== History ==
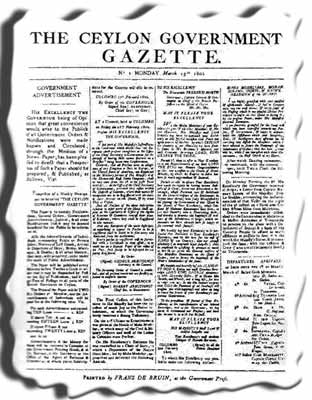
Front page of The Ceylon Government Gazette first issue on 15 March 1802.

The British captured some of the coastal areas of Sri Lanka in 1796. In 1802, they launched The Ceylon Government Gazette to publish British government notices in the areas under their control. This was one of the series of papers launched by the British in their crown colonies, including Calcutta Gazette (1784), St. Lucia Gazette (1780), Cape Town Gazette and African Advertiser (1800), etc. The first issue of the Ceylon Gazette appeared on 15 March 1802. It was printed by Frans de Bruin at the renovated press built in 1737 by the Dutch, who controlled the coastal areas of the island until 1796. A Tamil version of the Gazette was started in 1806, and a Sinhala version in 1814.

In 1972 the Sri Lankan government of Sirimavo Bandaranaike adopted a new Sri Lankan constitution and repudiated Dominion status. The paper ceased publication that year after issue 15,011. Publication resumed after adoption of the 1978 constitution by the J. R. Jayewardene government. In 2011, the Sri Lankan government announced that it would revoke a Gazette notification by the British government dating back to 1818, which named and shamed the key conspirators of the Great Rebellion of 1817–1818, the first struggle by Ceylonese ( Kandyan Sinhalese) to gain independence from Britain.

== Function ==
The Gazette is published in Sinhala, Tamil, and English which are the three official languages of Sri Lanka. It publishes promulgated bills, presidential decrees, governmental ordinances, major legal acts as well as vacancies, government exams, requests for tender, changes of names, company registrations and deregistrations, land restitution notices, liquor licence applications, transport permits and auctions announced by various government departments.

Part I – Section (I) is for proclamations, appointments etc. Section (IIB) is for tenders and auction sales. Section (IIA) is for exams, vacancies, etc. Initially, the Gazette was published on Mondays. Now it is published every Friday.

== See also ==
- Sunday Observer (Sri Lanka)
