= List of Archaeological Protected Monuments in Ampara District =

This is a list of Archaeological Protected Monuments in Ampara District, Sri Lanka.

Monument	Image	Location	Grama Niladhari Division	Divisional Secretary's Division	Registered	Description	Ref
A. C. camp village ruins		A. C. camp village	Kotawehera	Ampara	10 October 2014	Rocks with paintings of prehistoric era, cave inscriptions and drip ledged caves in the forest of A. C. camp (latitude 07º 14' 59.8" N and longitude 081º 37' 35" E)	
Abayasinghepura ruins		Abayasinghepura	No. PP 03 Panama	Lahugala	10 October 2014	The cave and surrounding area with archaeological evidences at Abayasinghepura (on the road leads to fisheries village and lagoon) (latitude 06º 76653' N and longitude 081º 81470' E)	
Akkara 100 yaya ruins		Karangawa	No. W/89/J, Karangawa	Ampara	10 October 2014	Rock plain on which the pieces of terracotta are scattered and the surrounding area in the area called Akkara 100 yaya West (latitude 07º 18' 24.1" N and longitude 081º 39' 36.3" E)	
Akuloba ruins		Akuloba	Borapola	Mahaoya	10 October 2014	Other archaeological remains with hillock of ancient Dagoba, ruins of buildings with stone pillars at the area surrounding Akuloba Paddy fields of (latitude 07º 50116' N and longitude 081º 38752' E)	
Akuloba ruins		Akuloba	Borapola	Maha Oya	26 December 2014	Site of the ruins of buildings (latitude 07º 52' 30.7" N and longitude 081º 39' 29.9" E)	
Alankulama ruins		Alankulama	No. 17 Addalachchenei	Addalachchenai	10 October 2014	Hillock covering ancient chaithya and ruins in surrounding area; Drip ledged cave in the middle of the paddy filed and archaeological evidences in the surrounding area; The place where slag particles and ancient potter pieces are scattered	
Aligala			No. W/89/B, Samapura	Ampara	10 October 2014	Rock plain with archaeological evidences including the rock inscription, flight of steps, ruins of buildings, chronicles situated towards West from Japan Sama Chaitya at the place called Aligala in the area of Hardy Technical College (latitude 07º 17' 09.9" N and longitude 081º 38' 58.0" E)	
Aligambe ruins		Aligambe	Aligambe	Alayadiwembu	10 October 2014	Rock plain called Aligambe with two ancient hillocks covering dagoba (latitude 07º 63570" N and longitude 081º 76' 804" E); The rock plain called Aligambe with hillock covering dagoba, stairways and other archaeological evidence (latitude 07º 19' 21" N and longitude 081º 46' 46" E)	
Alioluwa Wewa ruins		Colony No. B 07	No. W/86/H, Ambamalthalawa	Ampara	26 December 2014	Site of the construction of ancient buildings with stone pillars at Catchment area of Alioluwa lake (latitude 07º 14' 54.2" N and longitude 81º 34' 12.9" E)	
Aloka Raja Maha Vihara		Ekgaloya	No. W/24/B, Ekgaloya	Damana	26 December 2014	All places of ruins of ancient Arama complex including ancient Chaithya and ruins of buildings (latitude 07º 18' 43.8" N and longitude 81º 64' 50.3" E)	
Anaulundal Wayal ruins		Anaulundal	No. AP/20A/4 Aalimnahar	Akkaraipattu	10 October 2014	Rock with the remains of ancient building and chisel holing at the place called “Anaulundal Wayal” (latitude 07º 71' 94" N and longitude 081º 76' 11.2" E)	
Andirayan cemetery		Walathapitiya	No. 89B, Walathapitiya 011	Samanthurai	10 October 2014	Place with the remains of ancient settlement (Pieces of pottery scattered in the area) at the place called Andirayan cemetery (latitude 07º 18' 02.5" N and longitude 081º 43' 18" E)	
Aralupitiya ancient bridge			No. 140, Kehelulla	Padiyathalawa	10 October 2014	(latitude 07º 19' 372" N and longitude 081º 13' 554" E)	
Aranthalawa ruins		Aranthalawa	Aranthalawa	Mahaoya	10 October 2014	Aranthalawa hillock of ruins with the hillock of ancient Chaitya and other archeological remains at the place of (latitude 07º 60659' N and longitude 081º 42708' E)	
Ariyakara Vihara		Peranigama	Thottama W/25	Damana	10 October 2014	A rock called “Vehera Pudamaya” with other archaeological evidences including inscriptions at Ariyakara Vihara premises, ruins of buildings, flight of steps, illustrations of animals and other sketches	
Aththaikandam ruins			Kambiluwil 02	Thirukkovil	26 December 2014	Hillock of ancient Stupa, ruins of buildings at surrounding area and rock plane with archeological ruins belonging to the village (latitude 07º 08' 17" N and longitude 81º 48' 46" E)	
Athurugiri Purana Raja Maha Vihara		Kudaharasgala	Kudaharasgala	Mahaoya	10 October 2014	Places with ruins of buildings and other archaeological remains (latitude 07º 48533' N and longitude 081º 33737' E)	
Balagala Wewa		Bandaraduwa	No. W/104B/2, Bandaraduwa	Uhana	10 October 2014		
Bandaraduwa Megalithic cemeteries			No. W/104B/2, Bandaraduwa	Uhana	26 December 2014	(latitude 071º 25' 26.7" N and longitude 081º 34' 32.2" E)	
Berawaniwela archaeological site		Berawaniwela	No. PP 02 Panama South	Lahugala	10 October 2014	Site with archaeological ruins (latitude 06º 75356' N and longitude 081º 77824' E)	
Buddhangala Forest Hermitage				Ampara			
Buddhist colony ruins		Buddhist colony	No. 1 Dighavapi	Addalachchenai	10 October 2014	Drip ledged cave complex with cave inscriptions and cave inscriptions	
Bulathwaththayaya ruins		Kahatagasyaya	No. W/100/A/180, kahatagasyaya	Uhana	10 October 2014	Small rock with rock inscription and hillock of Dagoba at the place called Bulathwaththayaya (latitude 07º 19' 05" N and longitude 081º 34' 08" E)	
Colony No. B 07 ruins		Colony No. B 07	No. W/86/H, Ambamalthalawa	Ampara	26 December 2014	Rock plane with plight of steps in the paddy field (latitude 07º 15' 06.8" N and longitude 81º 34' 15.5" E)	
Darampanawa archaeological site		Darampanawa	No. P 26 Hijranagar	Pothuvil	10 October 2014	Darampanawa archaeological site with prehistoric art, cave inscriptions and all the drip edged caves, ruins of buildings, hillock covering chaitya, ponds and other archaeological evidence (latitude 06º 56' 10" N and longitude 081º 47' 09" E)	
Dewala Elakandiya Archaeological ruins			Pollebedda	Maha Oya	23 January 2009	The ancient ruins situated at Dewala Elakandiya ruins	
Dewale kele ruins		Ellegoda	Kudaharasgala	Mahaoya	10 October 2014	Complex of ruins with all the places containing ancient buildings at the place called Dewalekele	
Dighavapi		Dighavapi		Addalachchenai	18 April 1947	The Stupa	
Dighavapi		Dighavapi		Addalachchenai	31 December 1999	Ancient caves with drip ledges and inscriptions, brick rampart, stone steps, stone pillars, carved holes on rock, workshops using stone posts and complete land with other ruins	
Dighavapi village ruins		village No. 234	No. 2 Dighavapi	Addalachchenai	10 October 2014	Rocks with drip ledged cave and Brahmi inscriptions and rocks with archaeological evidences including chisel holing situated in the paddy filed No. 234	
Dissa wewa bund ruins		Mahawela	No. W/100/1, Lathugala	Uhana	10 October 2014	The rock plain with the bund of ancient Dissa wewa, evidences of ruined buildings connected to the lake and other archaeological evidences (latitude 07º 22' 06" N and longitude 081º 33' 59" E)	
Dissa wewa Spill		Panagolla	No. W/100/A/180, Kahatagasyaya	Uhana	10 October 2014	Spill with laid stone slabs and the bund of ancient lake called Dissa wewa (latitude 07º 19' 54" N and longitude 081º 34' 32" E)	
Diviyagala Raja Maha Vihara			No. W/27/D, Diviyagala	Damana	26 December 2014	Arama complex including ancient Chaithya all caves with inscriptions and drip ledges, rock inscriptions and ruins of buildings (latitude 07º 22' 798" N and longitude 81º 62' 68.4" E)	
Divulana mountain range ruins		Bandaraduwa	No. W/104B/2, Bandaraduwa	Uhana	10 October 2014	Ruins at Divulana mountain range with drip ledged caves with inscriptions	
Divulana Wewa ruins		Rajagalatenna	No. W/104/4025, Rajagalatenna South	Uhana	10 October 2014	Ancient Bisokotuwa, sluice, ancient bund of the lake and anicut in the middle of Divulana lake (latitude 07º 28' 05" N and longitude 081º 35' 47" E)	
Dungalayaya ruins		Polwaga Colony	No. W/86/F, Polwaga Colony	Ampara	26 December 2014	Site of ruins with ancient stone pillars in the area called Dungalayaya, 117 (latitude 07º 14' 31.5" N and longitude 81º 35' 22.6" E)	
Ekgal oya Reservoir ruins		Ekgal oya	No. W/24/B Ekgal oya	Damana	10 October 2014	Sites of the ruins of buildings with stone pillars in the middle of Ekgal oya tank (latitude 07º 15801' N and longitude 081º 61287' E)	
Elakatuwa Welyaya ruins		9th Mile post	Perani Lahugala	Lahugala	10 October 2014	Site of ruins with ancient stone pillars and buildings located in the place (latitude 06º 87221' N and longitude 081º 70638' E)	
Eragama Wewa		Rahumanth Nagar, Kuduvil, Manikkamadu, Ameer Alipuram	No. 5-2-34005 Eragama 07, No. 5- 2-34-035 Eragama 01, No. 5-2-34-055 Eragama 04 and No. 5-2-34-025 Eragama 025	Eragama	10 October 2014	The old sluice and the bund	
Eragama Wewa ruins		Eragama 01	No. 5-2-34-035, Eragama 01	Eragama	26 December 2014	Rock plane with archeological evidences (Olinda poru, crucible) and the place nearby where pieces of ancient pottery are scattered near Eragama lake (latitude 07º 14' 419.1" N and longitude 81º 43' 056" E)	
Eththama ruins		Eththama	No. P/10, Eththama	Pothuvil	26 December 2014	Place with ancient stone pillars at the place where houses are situated in Eththama village (latitude 06º 53' 17" N and longitude 81º 49' 33" E)	
Galahitiyagoda ruins		Galahitiyagoda	No. W/88A/170, Galahitiyagoda	Uhana	26 December 2014	Small rock plane with Chronicles at the area called 40 Idama (latitude 07º 21' 52" N and longitude 081º 36' 23" E)	
Galapitagala ruins		Galapitagala	No. W/104/C, Galapitagala	Uhana	26 December 2014	Small rock with plight of steps near the road of paddy field No. 32/109 (latitude 07º 27' 34" N and longitude 081º 39' 17" E)	
Galdebokkawa reserve ruins		Galdebokkawa	Kanchirankuda	Thirukkovil	10 October 2014	Rock plain with prehistoric evidences in Galdebokkawa reserve	
Galkanda cave		Galkanda	Galkanda	Damana	10 October 2014	Cave inscriptions and drip ledged Galkanda cave (latitude 07º 15564' N and longitude 081º 05926' E)	
Galmaduwa Raja Maha Vihara, Ampara		Grama No. 05, Galmaduwa	No. W/27/H, Galmaduwa	Damana	26 December 2014	All archeological evidences including stone pillars and places of ancient buildings (latitude 07º 26' 23.5" N and longitude 81º 68' 93.2" E)	
Gamwela ruins		Gamwela	No. 141/C, Hagamwela	Padiyathalawa	10 October 2014	Rock with archaeological evidences in the land called Mungalawa (latitude 07º 26' 42.6" N and longitude 081º 13' 25.2" E)	
Gamawela ruins		Gamawela	No. 141/C, Hagamwela	Padiyathalawa	26 December 2014	The rocks with archeological evidences in the land called Gamawelawaththa (latitude 07º26' 24.7" N and longitude 81º 13' 18.5" E)	
Girikumbala Raja Maha Vihara			No. WA104/020, Bakkiella	Uhana	26 December 2014	Bases of pillars Postholes, place with ruins of buildings where pieces of ancient bricks and tiles are scattered and inscription at the premises (latitude 07º 18' 21.2" N and longitude 081º 35' 50.1" E)	
Gonagala ruins		Gonagala	No. W/104C/2105, Gonagala	Uhana	26 December 2014	Site with chronicles on the rock plane in Paddy land No. 31/65 (latitude 07º 25' 55" N and longitude 081º 39' 33" E)	
Gonagolla Vihara		Kothmale colony	No. W/104A/01/050, Kothmale	Uhana	10 October 2014	Rock with the paintings of Adiwasi people (Indigenous) and Anuradhapura era, all drip ledged caves, hillock of Dagoba buildings with stone pillars, places of ruins, rock inscriptions and flights of steps and buildings, and the rock with two ponds and base stones situated in Gonagolla cave temple (Punchi Seegiriya)	
Gonanpanna ruins		Lathugala	No. W/100/1, Lathugala	Uhana	10 October 2014	Site of ruins of buildings and stone pillars and foundation at the area called Gonanpanna (latitude 07º 23' 51" N and longitude 081º 31' 22" E)	
Gorikana stone quarry			136 A 1 Borapola	Maha Oya	23 January 2009	The stone quarry situated on the Gorikana Mount slope	
Grama 09 Keenawaththa ruins		35A land	No. W/27/E, Keenawaththa	Damana	26 December 2014	Cave complex with drip ledges and inscriptions (latitude 07º 22' 98.2" N and longitude 81º 65' 430" E)	
Hagamwela ruins		Hagamwela	No. 141/C, Hagamwela	Padiyathalawa	10 October 2014	Archaeological evidences found in Kokagala mountain range (latitude 07º 25' 028" N and longitude 081º 12' 910" E)	
Hagirigolla Kotawehera ruins		Grama 09 Keenawaththa	No. W/27/E, Keenawaththa	Damana	26 December 2014	Rock plane with ancient Chaithya and evidences of buildings in the middle of paddy field (latitude 07º 24' 250" N and longitude 81º 63' 63.8" E)	
Harasgala Gallen Vihara		Harasgala	Kekirihena	Mahaoya	10 October 2014	All drip ledged caves at the premises (latitude 07º 46573' N and longitude 081º 32880' E)	
Heda Oya stone anicut		14 Kanuwegama	No. PP 12 Hulannuge West	Lahugala	10 October 2014	(latitude 06º 89074' N and longitude 081º 64542' E)	
Heda Oya ruins		Hulannuge	No. PP 12	Lahugala	10 October 2014	Site of ruins with stone pillars near “Heda Oya” (latitude 06º 89073' N and longitude 081º 64594' E)	
Heda oya yaya ruins		Nugewewa	Hulannuge Kandahindagama	Lahugala	10 October 2014	The site with hillocks covered by stone pillars and stone plates situated in the area (latitude 06º 89592' N and longitude 081º 64335' E)	
Heethawanniya rock Archaeological ruins			136 A 1 Borapola	Maha Oya	23 January 2009	The drip ledged rock caves with inscriptions situated on the Heethawanniya Mount slope	
Hennanigala Raja Maha Vihara		Hennanigala		Dehiattakandiya	23 February 2007	Ancient Bodhigaraya, image house, pond with naga symbol, ancient rampart, Dathumandira, Poyage, Dagoba and the cave	
Himidurawa ruins		Himidurawa	No. WA88-C270, Himidurawa	Uhana	26 December 2014	Site of the ruins of buildings with stone pillars (latitude 07º 18' 26.3" N and longitude 81º 37' 52" E)	
Hinguremada Raja Maha Vihara		Hinguremada	Pollebedda	Mahaoya	10 October 2014	Hillock of ancient and all places containing ruins of buildings at the premises	
Horabokka ruins			No. 141/C, Hagamwela	Padiyathalawa	10 October 2014	Complex of ruins including all the caves with Brahmi inscription and drip ledges in the mountain range called Kokagalakanda (Horabokka) (latitude 07º 27' 24.8" N and longitude 081º 12' 28.4" E)	
Hulannuge ruins		Hulannuge	No. PP/12, Hulannuge	Lahugala	26 December 2014	Hillock of ancient Dagoba and place of ruins with stone pillars at the place called 14th mile post belonging to Hulannuge village (latitude 06º 91' 566" N and longitude 81º 65' 134" E)	
Hulannuge ruins		Hulannuge	No. PP 12 Hulannuge	Lahugala	10 October 2014	The site with drip edged caves, ancient brick mound, stairways carved in the natural rock and other archaeological evidences (latitude 06º 89494' N and longitude 081º 65807' E)	
Ibbige Ela		Wilathalawa	No. 144/A1, Iddapola	Mahaoya	10 October 2014	Place containing scattered slag within paddy land near Ibbige Ela (latitude 07º 50540' N and longitude 081º 27970' E)	
Ilukpitiya cave		Ilukpitiya	W/27/A Peranigama, Hingurana	Damana	10 October 2014	(latitude 07º 21455' N and longitude 081º 66710' E)	
Ilukpitiya Purana Vihara		Peranigama	No. W/27/A, Peranigama	Damana	26 December 2014	All places with archaeological evidences including ancient Chaithya, cave complex with drip ledges and inscriptions and ruins of buildings (latitude 07º 21' 210" N and longitude 81º 66' 47.8" E)	
Iluksena ruins		Iluksena (East)	No. 5-2-34-015 Eragama 02	Eragama	10 October 2014	Rock with drip ledged cave (latitude 7º 13' 005" N and longitude 081º 44' 065" E)	
Isanganichmai ruins		Isanganichmai	No. AP/20A/3, Isanganichmai	Akkaraipattu	26 December 2014	Rock plane, where chisel holings and pieces of ancient bricks and pottery and other archeological evidences are scattered, in the middle of paddy field (latitude 071º 258" N and longitude 81º 47' 55" E)	
Isanganichmai ruins			No. AP/20A/3, Isanganichmai	Akkaraipattu	26 December 2014	Rock plane with hillock of ancient Chaithya, places of the ruins of buildings and where ancient tiles, bricks etc. are scattered, in the middle of paddy field belonging to Isanganichmai village (latitude 07º 13' 06" N and longitude 81º 47' 46" E)	
Kachchena Rahumanthi ruins		Kachchena Rahumanthi	No. 5-2-34-005 Eragama 07	Eragama	10 October 2014	Natural rock boulder with stairways, base pockets, and natural rock plain with the signs of a drain and the rock plain with ruins of a Dagoba (Stupa) on the West and rock boulder where stairway is designed on the South (latitude 7º 13' 58" N and longitude 081º 45' 39" E)	
Kahatagasyaya ruins		Kahatagasyaya	No. W/100/A/180, Kahatagasyaya	Uhana	10 October 2014	Small rock plain with flight of steps, chisel holing and crucible (latitude 07º 20' 24" N and longitude 081º 34' 10" E)	
Kambetta ruins		Kambetta	No. 02, Kambatta	Thirukkovil	10 October 2014	03 rock boulders with archaeological evidence situated in the middle of the paddy field (latitude 07º 08' 21" N and longitude 081º 48' 07" E)	
Kanchikudiaru ruins		Kanchikudiaru	Kanchikudiaru	Thirukkovil	10 October 2014	Site with relics consist of building remaining and ancient hillock covering Chaitya near the lake; All caves with drip ledge and inscriptions and natural stone boulder with stairways situated near the lake; Hillock covering the Chaitya and the rock boulder with stairway situated in the Kanchikudiaru	
Kandahindagama ruins		Kandahindagama	No. PP 12 Hulannuge West	Lahugala	10 October 2014	Buddhist Monastery complex with hillock covering chaitya, teras walls, brick mounds, rock cut line in the natural rock and stairways in 16th Milepost (latitude 06º 90573' N and longitude 081º 64342' E)	
Kandurugoda Archaeological Site		Kandurugoda	No. W/86C/005, Dambethalawa	Ampara	10 October 2014	The archaeological site with ancient chaitya, shrine, ruins of other buildings (latitude 07º 17' 33" N and longitude 081º 32' 45" E)	
Karabana ruins			Wadinagala	Damana	26 December 2014	Archaeological sites, where slags and pieces of ancient pottery are scattered, belonging to Karabana village (latitude 071º 05' 38" N and longitude 81º 57' 78.4" E)	
Karabana ruins			Wadinagala	Damana	26 December 2014	Places of buildings with ancient stone pillars belonging to Karabana village (latitude 71º 0884" N and longitude 81º 57' 35.2" E)	
Karandikulam Archaeological ruins		Karandikulam		Addalachchenai	31 December 1999	All rocks, carved stairway, ancient stone quarry and ruins of buildings	
Karankowa ruins		Karankowa (Kotawehera)	Pansalgoda	Lahugala	10 October 2014	Archaeological site with Chaithya mounds and ruins of buildings at Karankowa (latitude 06º 85258' N and longitude 081º 75067' E)	
Kethsirigama ruins		Kethsirigama	W/24 Kethsirigama	Damana	10 October 2014	Drip ledged cave at Kethsirigama with stone inscriptions (latitude 07º 17198' N and longitude 081º 58847' E)	
Kethsirigama ruins		Kethsirigama	W/26 Kethsirigama	Damana	10 October 2014	Site of the ruins of buildings with stone pillars in the middle of the paddy field (latitude 07º 17343' N and longitude 081º 57956' E)	
Kochchikachena Wellapatitamale ruins		Alankulama	No. 17 Addalachchenei	Addalachchenai	10 October 2014	Rock with rock inscriptions, flight of steps, base pockets, sediments of stone tools and remains of ancient pottery at the place called “Kochchikachena Wellapatitamale”	
Kohombana ruins		Kohombana	No. W/102/01, Walagampura	Uhana	26 December 2014	Site with ruins of buildings (latitude 07º 23' 18" N and longitude 081º 37' 02" E)	
Kokkulama ruins		Kokkulama	No. 11C, Sagama	Thirukkovil	10 October 2014	Old settlement site with ancient pieces of pottery and stone archaeological evidences situated in Kokkulama reserve (latitude 07º 05' 22" N and longitude 081º 44' 58" E)	
Konduwattuwana Wewa ruins		Govikandawura	No. W/86/K 060 Kotawehera	Ampara	10 October 2014	Place with the ruins of ancient buildings at the area called Konduwatuwan (latitude 07º 16' 38.3" N and longitude 081º 38' 03.4" E)	
Kollegama Raja Maha Vihara (Holike)			No. 138, Holike	Padiyathalawa	26 December 2014	The place with ruins of buildings and other archaeological relics at Ancient Temple premises (latitude 07º 22' 098" N and longitude 81º 15' 66.7" E)	
Kolongemmegoda ruins		Wilathalawa	No. 144/A1, Iddapola	Mahaoya	10 October 2014	Kolongemmegoda rock plain with hillock of ancient Dagoba, ruins of buildings with stone pillars, ponds and sediments of stone tools of prehistoric era (latitude 07º 55420' N and longitude 081º 27977' E)	
Korai stone bridge		Vinayagapuram	Vinayagapuram 3	Thirukkovil	10 October 2014	Stone bridge in the middle of Korai lagoon	
Kossagalakanda ruins		Rajagalatenna	No. W/104/A005, Walagampura	Uhana	10 October 2014	Kossagalakanda with drip ledged caves containing cave inscriptions and other marks in Kossagala village (latitude 07º 23' 58" N and longitude 081º 34' 59" E)	
Kossapola cave complex		Kossapola	No. W/86/E, Wavinna South	Ampara	10 October 2014	Drip ledged cave complex (latitude 07º 14' 32.5″ N and longitude 081º 35' 22.6" E)	
Kotawehera forest ruins		Kotaweheragama	No. W/86/k 060, Kotawehera	Ampara	10 October 2014	The place with the ruins of ancient buildings and other archaeological evidences in Kotawehera forest (latitude 07º 16' 06.6" N and longitude 081º 37' 58.5" E)	
Kotawehera Purana Raja Maha Vihara		Ganangolla	No. W/86/K, Kotawehera	Ampara	26 December 2014	Hillock of Chaithya, hillock of ruins and other archaeological evidences (latitude 07º 15' 29.7" N and longitude 81º 37' 51.5" E)	
Kotawehera ruins		Kotawehera	Kotawehera	Ampara	10 October 2014	Small natural rock plain with archaeological graffiti situated towards west from Kotawehera school premises; Drip ledged cave belonging to Kotawehera School premises	
Kotigala rock Archaeological ruins			136 A 1 Borapola	Maha Oya	24 July 2009	The drip-ledged cave and Brahmi letters and the drip-ledged cave at the Venue called Digavapya, Kotigala	
Kotigala ruins		Pennanweli	No. SP 84C-005-07 Eragama	Eragama	10 October 2014	Kotigala rock plain where the drip ledged cave with Brahmi inscriptions is situated in the place (latitude 7º 16' 46" N and longitude 081º 45' 30" E); Rock boulder with chisel holing from the West of the rock plain (latitude 7º 16' 47" N and longitude 081º 45' 31" E)	
Kotte Vihara		Thambiluvil 2	Thambiluwil 2	Thirukkovil	10 October 2014	Hillock covering Chaitya and Rock plain with evidences of stairway and building ruins	
Kudakalli ruins		Kudakalli	No. P 18 Sinnaulla	Pothuvil	10 October 2014	Rock boulder called Kudakalli with ancient buildings and stairways situated near Kudakalli lagoon (latitude 06º 49' 11" N and longitude 081º 49' 22.3" E)	
Kudumbigala		Kunukola	No. PP 02 Panama South	Lahugala	10 October 2014	Place with all archaeological evidences including all drip ledged caves with inscriptions, with ancient buildings, hillocks covering Stupas and flight of steps (latitude 06º 67263' N and longitude 081º 74664' E)	
Kuduvil ruins		Kuduvil	No. SP 84C-005-07 Eragama	Eragama	10 October 2014	Rock boulder with stairway Kethukawata and Terracotta remains in the area (latitude 7º 16' 07" N and longitude 081º 4' 39" E)	
Kuduvil ruins		Kuduvil	No. SP84C-005-07, Eragama (Irakkamam)	Eragama	26 December 2014	Two rocks with relics of Terracotta items and the place where iron has been produced, pieces of ancient pottery in Kuduwil village (latitude 07º 16' 10" N and longitude 81º 44' 42" E)	
Kuduvil ruins		Kuduvil	No. 5-2-34-005-07, Eragama	Eragama	26 December 2014	Rock plane with ancient signs (signs of a mortar) and rock plane with evidences of ancient buildings belonging to Kuduwil village (latitude 07º 16' 09" N and longitude 81º 49' 20" E)	
Kukul Kotuwa		Ashroff village	Oluvil	Addalachchenai	10 October 2014	Two rock plains with the ruins of ancient buildings	
Kukuluwa Raja Maha Vihara		Mahanagapura-Ihalagam	Thottama W/25	Damana	10 October 2014	Archaeological evidences including ancient chaithya, ruins of buildings with stone pillars, ponds at the premises (latitude 07º 13884' N and longitude 081º 70325' E)	
Kunukola Lagoon ruins		Kunukolakanda	No. PP 02 Panama North	Lahugala	10 October 2014	Rock with evidences of the construction of ancient buildings, stone pillars, ponds and other archaeological evidences (latitude 06º 70694' N and longitude 081º 79292' E)	
Kurunduvinna Archaeological ruins		Kurunduvinna	Pollebedda	Maha Oya	23 January 2009	The ancient steps carved on the natural rock situated in the Village of Kurunduwinna	
Lahugala Kiri Vehera		Lahugala	Perani Lahugala PP 10	Lahugala	10 October 2014	Ancient Chaithya and ruins of Vihara complex in the territory	
Lahugala Kota Vehera			Pansalgoda	Lahugala	10 October 2014	Buddhist Monastery complex with archaeological evidences including ancient Dagaba, building sites with stone pillars, flight of steps carved on natural rock plain, drip ledged caves located in the place (latitude 06º 87831' N and longitude 081º 75269' E)	
Lathugala ruins		Lathugala	No. W/100/1, Lathugala	Uhana	10 October 2014	Site of ruins of buildings and stone pillars (latitude 07º 23' 14" N and longitude 081º 33' 01" E)	
Lunubokka (Nagiri) Aranya Senasana		Marava	No. 139B, Komana	Padiyathalawa	10 October 2014	All the caves with inscriptions, drip ledges and other archaeological remains (latitude 07º 21' 363" N and longitude 081º 19' 750" E)	
Madana Perani Wehera		Kahatagasyaya	No. W/100/A/180, Kahatagasyaya	Uhana	10 October 2014	Hillock of ancient Dagoba, place with ruins of buildings and stone pillars and other archaeological evidences in the surrounding area (latitude 07º 18' 35" N and longitude 081º 33' 36" E)	
Magul Maha Viharaya		Lahugala		Lahugala	26 March 1954		
Mahanaga Nevi Camp ruins		Shasthrawela	Panama Shasthrawela	Lahugala	10 October 2014	Ruins of Buddhist monastery complex with all archaeological evidences with rock inscriptions, hillocks covering Dagabas, stone pillars and drains situated within the Mahanaga Nevi Camp (latitude 07º 17976' N and longitude 081º 5639.8' E)	
Mahathalawa ruins		Mahathalawa	Unuwathurabubula	Maha Oya	26 December 2014	Places with ruins of buildings with stone pillars and other archaeological relics (latitude 07º 53' 564" N and longitude 081º 31' 816" E); Site of ruins with hillock of Chaithya and stone pillars (latitude 07º 56' 52.3" N and longitude 081º 34' 26.3" E)	
Maha Wewa sluice		9th Mile post village	Perani Lahugala	Lahugala	10 October 2014	Ancient sluice of the tank called “Mahawewa” (latitude 06º 86940'N and longitude 081º 74312' E)	
Malayadikanda ruins		Madawalalanda	No. W/24/A Madawalalanda	Damana	10 October 2014	Drip ledged cave with inscriptions at “Malayadikanda” alias “Aranyakanda” (latitude 07º 19879' N and longitude 081º 68158' E)	
Malwaththa ruins		Chadayamthalawa	Malwaththa 03	Samanthurai	10 October 2014	Rock plain with chisel holing and scattered ancient bricks in the premises belonging to Government Seed Farm Malwaththa (latitude 07º 21' 58" N and longitude 081º 43' 59" E)	
Manankulama lake ruins		Manankulama	Sagama	Thirukkovil	10 October 2014	Rock plain (with chisel holing) with archaeological evidence in the lake reserve; Rock plain with prehistoric evidence and chisel holing in the lake reserve	
Manankulama ruins		Manankulama	Sagama	Thirukkovil	10 October 2014	Rock plain with archaeological evidence (with chisel holing) situated in the North of the Sagama Primary College	
Mandiyawalikulam ruins		Thandiadi	Thandiadi	Thirukkovil	10 October 2014	Ruins with stone pillars	
Manikkamadu Kanda ruins		Manikkamadu	No. 5-2-34-005-07 Eragama	Eragama	10 October 2014	Manikkamadu Kanda with drip ledged caves with Brahmi inscriptions belonging to Manikkamadu village (hill on the north from Eragama Lake) (latitude 7º 15' 17" N and longitude 081º 43' 18" E)	
Manikkamadu ruins		Manikkamadu	No. 5-2-34-005-07 Eragama	Eragama	10 October 2014	Manikkamadu Dagoba mound and rock boulders with stairways (latitude 7º 15' 36" N and longitude 081º 43' 16" E)	
Mattayagala forest ruins		Madawalalanda	No. W/24/A Madawalalanda	Damana	10 October 2014	Rock with drip ledged caves with inscriptions and ruins of buildings and archaeological evidences scattered in the surrounding area in Mattayagala forest reservation (latitude 07º 19619' N and longitude 081º 6724.9' E)	
Meerahala Purana Vihara		Meerahala	W/25/B Bakmitiyawa	Damana	10 October 2014	Ancient Chaithya at Meerahala ancient vihara premises and other archaeological evidences (latitude 07º 38350' N and longitude 081º 65840' E)	
Meewagala ruins		Wilathalawa	No. 144/A, Iddapola	Mahaoya	10 October 2014	Meewagala rock plain with hillock of Chaitya, cave with drip ledges and cave inscriptions and chronicles (latitude 07º 51232' N and longitude 081º 28889' E)	
Mekiniyangala ruins		9th Mile post	Perani Lahugala	Lahugala	10 October 2014	Buddhist monastery complex with ancient Dagaba, drip ledged caves, ponds and rampart walls located in the site (latitude 06º 87868' N and longitude 081º 71190' E)	
Methodist Church, Kalmunai		Kalmunai	No. 01 B, Kalmunei	Kalmunai	26 December 2014		
Meulugala Aranya Senasana		Kirihandigala	No. 138/B, Kolamanthalawa	Padiyathalawa	10 October 2014	Drip ledged rock caves (latitude 07º 21' 414" N and longitude 081º 17' 066" E)	
Mihindu Aranya Senasanaya		Kethsirigama	No. W/26/A, Kethsirigama	Damana	26 December 2014	Arama complex with ruins of ancient buildings, plight of steps, Chaithya at the premises (latitude 71º 66' 85" N and longitude 81º 58' 195" E)	
Mottayagala ruins		Panankadu	Panankadu No. AV13	Alayadiwembu	10 October 2014	The rock boulder called Mottayagala with evidences of ancient building constructions (latitude 07º 08' 40" N and longitude 081º 48' 17" E); The rock boulder called Mottayagala with cave inscriptions and drip ledged caves; The rock boulder called Mottayagala with Brahmi inscriptions and all drip ledged caves; The rock boulder called Mottayagala with drip ledged caves	
Mudalaik Kalmadu ruins		Sembukkulam village at 5th mile post	No. AP/20A/4 Aalimnahar	Akkaraipattu	10 October 2014	Rock with chisel holing and scattered pottery pieces and bricks in the middle of paddy field called “Mudalaik Kalmadu” (latitude 07º 21' 08.2" N and longitude 081º 79' 55.3" E)	
Mudalaik Kalmel Kanda ruins		Aalimnahar	No. AP/20A/4 Aalimnahar	Akkaraipattu	10 October 2014	Rock with hillocks of Buddhist chaithyas, flight of steps ruins of buildings, chisel holing with drains at the place called “Mudalaik Kalmel Kanda” (latitude 07º 20' 58.1" N and longitude 081º 79' 01.8" E)	
Muhandiram Archaeological ruins		Mollikulam		Addalachchenai	31 December 1999	Ancient caves with drip ledge at Muhandiram rock	
Muhudu Maha Viharaya		Pothuvil		Pothuvil			
Muwangala Raja Maha Vihara			No. W/27/13, Muwangala	Damana	26 December 2014	Rock with the drip ledged cave, rock inscriptions, ruins of buildings, plight of steps and other archaeological evidences at the premises (latitude 07º 35' 002" N and longitude 81º 76' 20.6" E)	
Muwangala ruins		Muwangala	No. W/27/B Muwangala	Damana	10 October 2014	Sites with ruins of buildings with ancient stone pillars and other archaeological evidences in the part “Grama 02” (latitude 07º 26221' N and longitude 081º 66587' E)	
Namal Oya Wewa ruins		Namaloya	No. W/86C/005, Dambethalawa	Ampara	10 October 2014	Ancient constructions in the middle of Namal Oya lake	
Navagiriyawa ruins		Navagiriyawa	No. W/104/60, Navagiriyawa	Uhana	26 December 2014	Site of ruins of buildings with stone pillars (latitude 07º 26' 42" N and longitude 081º 37' 070" E)	
Nawagiri Aru Wewa ruins		Bandaraduwa	No. W/104B/2, Bandaraduwa	Uhana	10 October 2014	Two rocks with the hillock of stupa, buildings with stone pillars, foundations of buildings, chisel holing	
Nawainna Purana Vihara			No. 141/B, Unapana	Padiyathalawa	26 December 2014	The two places with ruins of buildings and other archaeological evidences at Ancient Temple premises (latitude 07º 26' 152" N and longitude 81º 14' 104" E)	
Neelagiriseya			Perani Lahugala PP 10	Lahugala	10 October 2014	Neelagiri dagaba and the adjoining premises with buildings with stone pillars in inscriptions and sites with archaeological ruins, cave complex with cave inscriptions and prehistorical arts	
Nella Archaeological Site		Nella	No. W/100/A/180, Kahatagasyaya	Uhana	10 October 2014	The site with other archaeological remains including ancient Chaitya, places with ruins of buildings and stone pillars, drip ledged caves, inscription||	
Nidangala		Pollebedda	No. 136B	Maha Oya	26 December 2014	Rock called Nidangala with two rock inscriptions, plight of steps, chronicles and square type marks (latitude 07º 47' 94.1" N and longitude 081º 38' 530" E)	
Nidangala rock ruins		Pannalagama	No. W/25/A Pannalagama	Damana	10 October 2014	The rock called “Nidangala” (Dewalagala) with the ruins of buildings with stone pillars, flight of steps and rock inscriptions (latitude 07º 14752' N and longitude 081º 67728' E)	
Niyuguna Kanda ruins		Helagampura (Malayadigama)	No. 5-2- 34-050-04 Eragama 05	Eragama	10 October 2014	The hill called Niyuguna Kanda with Caves with rock inscriptions and drip ledges, boukder inscriptions, hillock covering chaitya, stairways and mound ruins	
Niyuguna Raja Maha Vihara			No. 5-2-34-0501, Eragama 05	Eragama	26 December 2014	Hillock of Dagoba, rock inscription, ruins of buildings, plight of steps, places with evidences of Pre-historic era and the mountain range with ruins of buildings, drip ledged caves, siripathul gal situated in the south of the Vihara (latitude 07º 13' 40" N and longitude 81º 43' 14" E)	
Niyuguna Raja Maha Vihara		Niyuguna	No. 5-2-34-0501 Eragama	Eragama	10 October 2014	Drip ledged cave located at the west of the Vihara (latitude 7º 13' 43" N and longitude 081º 42' 00" E)	
Norochcholei Arabi Charat ruins		Norochcholei	No. AP/20A/4 Aalimnahar	Akkaraipattu	10 October 2014	Natural rock plain on which drains have been built in the area called “Norochcholei Arabi Charat” (latitude 07º 12' 54" N and longitude 081º 44' 47" E)	
Okanda Devalaya		Okanda	No. PP 02 Panama South	Lahugala	10 October 2014	Rock with archaeological evidences at Okanda Dewalaya premises (latitude 06º 65089' N and longitude 081º 72000' E)	
Orukulam Archaeological ruins		Karandikulam		Addalachchenai	31 December 1999	Carved stairway of two rocks and carved elephant figures at Orukulam paddy field	
Othgamuwa archaeological site		Hulannuge	No. PP 12 Hulannuge West	Lahugala	10 October 2014	Othgamuwa archaeological site with ancient chaitya, ruins of buildings with stone pillars, inscriptions, drip ledged caves and other archaeological evidences. (latitude 06º 88582' N and longitude 081º 64853' E)	
Ovagiriya		Polwatta, Ampara				Ancient stupa and other ruins	
Padagoda Raja Maha Vihara		Pahalanda	No. W/28/A, Pahalanda	Damana	26 December 2014	Arama complex with ancient Chaithya and ruins of ancient buildings (latitude 07º 20' 512" N and longitude 81º 58' 188" E).; Ruins of buildings at the place called Medapallamayaye Pansalkumbura in front of Padagoda Raja Maha Vihara (latitude 07º 20' 512" N and longitude 81º 58' 188" E)	
Padavikanda Vihara		Marava	No. 139B, Komana	Padiyathalawa	10 October 2014	Natural rock plane with Hillock of ruins and inscriptions, drain system and pothole carved with a fish at the place (latitude 07º 20' 335" N and longitude 081º 20' 038" E)	
Padiyadora Raja Maha Vihara		Padiyathalawa	No. 140/D, Thalapita Oya Left	Padiyathalawa	10 October 2014	The ancient stupa, ruins of buildings, pond, wall and other archaeological evidences (latitude 70º 23' 981" N and longitude 081º 14' 900" E)	
Palaweli Archaeological Site		Palaweli	No. 89B, Walathapitiya 01	Samanthurai	10 October 2014	The archaeological site with other archaeological evidences including the ruins of a Bodhighara of an ancient Chaitya, building sites, inscriptions, flight of steps (latitude 07º 18' 34.3" N and longitude 081º 43' 09.1" E)	
Palaweli Shivan Kovil		Palaweli	No. 89B, Walathapitiya 01	Samanthurai	26 December 2014	Rock plane with other archeological evidences including ancient letters and signs in front of the premises of Shivan Kovil (latitude 07º 18' 27.6" N and longitude 81º 43' 05.1" E)	
Pallekadu Archaeological ruins		Oluvil		Addalachchenai	31 December 1999	Ruins of ancient dagoba, ancient stone wall and ruins of ancient buildings at Pallekadu jungle	
Panagolla old quarry		Kahatagasyaya	No. W/100A/180, Kahatagasyaya	Uhana	26 December 2014	Small rock with the marks of old quarry (latitude 07º 19' 49" N and longitude 081º 34' 26" E)	
Panama Wewa ruins		Weweyaya	Panama South	Lahugala	10 October 2014	Premises of building with ancient stone pillars in catchment area (latitude 06º 77495' N and longitude 081º 77955' E)	
Panankadu ruins		Panankadu	Panankadu No. AV13	Alayadiwembu	10 October 2014	The rock boulder called Mottayagala with old hillock covering chaitya, flight of steps, illustration of meditating Buddha, ruins of buildings, signs of hand railings, ponds, places with chisel holing, drip ledged caves and boulder places with the signs of chisel holing (latitude 07º 08' 40" N and longitude 081º 48' 17" E)	
Pannalgama ruins		Pannalgama	Kumana	Damana	10 October 2014	The site with the ruins of buildings with stone pillars and other archaeological evidences (latitude 07º 10730' N and longitude 081º 68184' E)	
Pannathgoda Purana Vihara		Pallamoya	No. W/26/B, Pallamoya	Damana	26 December 2014	All ruins of Arama complex with ancient Chaithya, rock inscription, plight of steps (latitude 071º 46' 59" N and longitude 81º 55' 235" E)	
Pansalgala ruins		Himindurawa	No. W/08J/270, Himindurawa	Uhana	10 October 2014	Building construction site with places containing chisel holing on the rock at the place called Pansalgala. (latitude 07º 18' 54.5" N and longitude 081º 37' 39.3" E); Natural rock plains with hillock of ancient Dagoba, two places containing ruins of buildings, places with chisel holding, post holes at the place called Pansalgala. (latitude 07º 18' 24.5" N and longitude 081º 37' 50.5" E)	
Pansalgala ruins		Samodayagama	No. W/86/J065, Paragahakele East	Ampara	10 October 2014	Drip ledged caves and cave inscriptions at the place called Pansalgala situated in forest conservation Paragahakele at the catchment area of Konduwattuwana Wewa (latitude 07º 16' 14.7" N and longitude 081º 37' 05.2" E); Natural rock plain called Pansalgala with ancient hillock of ancient Stupa, flight of steps, drains and other archaeological evidences (latitude 07º 16' 06.6" N and longitude 081º 37' 58.5" E); Cave complex with drip ledges and ancient paintings, graffiti of prehistoric era and cave inscriptions situated North from the rock called Pansalgala (latitude 07º 16' 11.1" N and longitude 081º 37' 08.6" E)	
Pansalgala ruins		Welekahagolla part B	No. W/88/A/1-185, Welikahagolla	Uhana	10 October 2014	Rock plain with the hillock of Chaitya, pillar bases, flight of steps and chronicles	
Pansalyaya ruins			No. 11C, Sagama	Thirukkovil	10 October 2014	Drip ledged cave, ruined buildings and other archaeological evidences found in the land (latitude 07º 06' 12" N and longitude 081º 45' 45" E)	
Paragahakele forest ruins		Paragahakele	Paragahakele East	Ampara	10 October 2014	Drip ledged cave in the forest called Paragahakele	
Parana Govipola Aththani inscription		Parana Govipola	Pansalgoda	Lahugala	10 October 2014	Aththani inscription located close to the Parana Govipola of Lahugala - Magul Maha Viharaya road (latitude 06º 86641' N and longitude 081º 73266' E)	
Parana Govipola Ethgala		Parana Govipola	Pansalgoda	Lahugala	10 October 2014	Ancient construction covered by a stone rampart wall called Ethgala (latitude 06º 86154' N and longitude 081º 73591' E)	
Parana Govipola ruins		Parana Govipola	Pansalgoda	Lahugala	10 October 2014	Site of buildings with ancient stone pillars (latitude 06º 86308' N and longitude 081º 73647' E)	
Patarkulam rock ruins		Oluvil	Oluvil	Addalachchenai	10 October 2014	“Patarkulam” rock with drip ledged cave with stone inscriptions, sites of ruins of buildings with chisel holing and other archaeological evidences and the rock with drip ledged cave with stone inscriptions	
Paththam village ruins		10 colaniya (Paththam village)	No. AP/20A/4 Aalimnahar	Akkaraipattu	10 October 2014	Rock plain with drains and other archaeological graffiti situated in the middle of paddy field at 10 colaniya (latitude 07º 12' 39" N and longitude 081º 44' 22" E)	
Perawelpitiya archaeological site		Lathugala	No. W/100/1, Lathugala	Uhana	10 October 2014	Perawelpitiya site of ruins where ruins of buildings are found with hillock of Dagoba and stone pillars (latitude 07º 23' 22" N and longitude 081º 32' 37" E)	
Perawelthalawa ruins		Perawelthalawa	Unuwathura Bubula	Maha Oya	26 December 2014	Site of the ruins of buildings (latitude 07º 37' 79" N and longitude 081º 35' 44.8" E)	
Piyangala Forest Hermitage		Piyangala	No. 104/5W, Piyangala	Uhana	26 December 2014	Site of the ruins of buildings with stone pillars (latitude 07º 30' 16" N and longitude 081º 37' 40" E)	
Piyangala frescoes cave		Piyangala	No. W/104/5W, Piyangala	Uhana	10 October 2014	Piyangala cave with paintings of Adiwasi People (Indigenous) (latitude 07º 30' 44" N and longitude 081º 37' 12" E)	
Pokkanagala ruins			No. 11C, Sagama	Thirukkovil	10 October 2014	Buddhist Monastery complex with hillocks of Chaitya, ruins of buildings and drip ledged caves in Pokkanagala reserve. (latitude 07º 07' 52" N and longitude 081º 45' 10" E)	
Pokunugala Raja Maha Vihara		Ambalanoya	Ambalanoya W/24/D	Damana	10 October 2014	All archaeological evidences including ancient chaithya, stone pillars and hillocks, ponds at the premises (latitude 07º 17894' N and longitude 081º 69590' E)	
Pollebedda drainage system ruins			Pollebedda	Maha Oya	23 January 2009	The drainage system made of rock	
Pothana Welyaya ruins		Sagama	No. 11C, Sagama	Thirukkovil	10 October 2014	Hillock covering a Chaitya and site with archaeological evidence in the land called Pothana Welyaya. (latitude 07º 07' 45" N and longitude 081º 45' 17" E)	
Radella ruins		Radella	No. PP 04 Panama North	Lahugala	10 October 2014	Rock plain with archaeological evidences situated in the middle of "Radella" paddy field. (latitude 06º 82123' N and longitude 081º 76987' E); Rock plain with archaeological evidences at the place of latitude 06º 81631' N and longitude 081º 76604' E; Rock plain with prehistoric evidences and other archaeological remains in "Radella Paddy fields	
Radella Wewa		Radella	No. PP 04 Panama North	Lahugala	10 October 2014	Radella tank with ancient sluice, tank bunt and break water (latitude 06º 82562' N and longitude 081º 75996' E)	
Rahuman Nagar ruins		Rahumanthi Nagar	No. 5-2-34-005 Eragama 07	Eragama	10 October 2014	Rock boulder with ancient stairway and other archaeological evidences at the place called Rahuman Nagar	
Rajagama 08 ruins		Rajagama 08	No. W/944/1-135, Rajagama South	Uhana	26 December 2014	Hillock of Dagoba in 95/1, land (latitude 07º 24' 45.3" N and longitude 081º 41' 45.4" E)	
Rajagalatenna		Rajagalatenna		Uhana			
Rajagalatenna ruins		Rajagalatenna	No. W/104/4025, Rajagalatenna South	Uhana	10 October 2014	Rock plain with buildings, flight of steps, chronicles and chisel holing at the catchment area of Divulana lake (latitude 07º 27' 56" N and longitude 081º 35' 35" E)	
Rajagalatenna ruins		Rajagalathenna 80 Bunteka	No. W/104/3, Rajagalathenna North	Uhana	26 December 2014	Site where ruins of buildings are scattered with stone pillars (latitude 07º 28' 36" N and longitude 081º 38' 37" E); Site of the ruins of buildings with stone pillars (latitude 07º 28' 33" N and longitude 081º 38' 37" E)	
Rajagiri Purana Vihara		Mahakandiya	No. WA100, Mahakandiya	Uhana	26 December 2014	Rock with hillock of ancient Dagoba, ruins of buildings with stone pillars, places with chisel holing and other archaeological evidences	
Rambakan Oya Dam ruins			Pollebedda	Maha Oya	23 January 2009	The ancient Tank bund of Rambukken Oya (Watawala Kandiya)	
Rupaskulama lake reserve ruins		Rupaskulama	Kanchirankuda	Thirukkovil	10 October 2014	Site with ruins of buildings in Rupaskulam lake reservation. (latitude 07º 05' 09" N and longitude 081º 46' 30" E)	
Rupaskulama lake reserve ruins			Kanchikudiaru	Thirukkovil	10 October 2014	Ruins consisting of caves with inscriptions, hillock covering Chaitya, Stone pillars, stairways and other archaeological remaining in Rupaskulama lake reserve; Ruins consist of ancient hillock covering Chaitya, drip and all caves with inscriptions and stone pillars in Rupaskulam lake reserve	
Rupaskulama ruins		Rupaskulama	Kanchirankuda	Thirukkovil	10 October 2014	Site with drip ledged caves with Brahmi inscriptions and stone pillars on the East of the Rupaskulam lake towards the road to lake. (latitude 07º 04' 39" N and longitude 081º 46' 53" E)	
Rupaskulama Wewa and bund		Rupaskulama	Kanchirankuda	Thirukkovil	10 October 2014	(latitude 07º 05' 10" N and longitude 081º 46' 53" E)	
Ruwanmaluwa Aranya Senasanaya		Pannalagama	W/25/A Pannalagama	Damana	10 October 2014	Other archaeological evidence including drip ledged caves with inscriptions and stone pillars (latitude 07º 09380' N and longitude 081º 6459' E)	
Sadhdhathissa Maha Vidyala ruins		Sadhdhathissapura	No. W/86/A, Jayawardhanapura	Ampara	10 October 2014	Rock plain with drip ledged cave, flight of steps and other Graffiti, construction site with stone pillars at the premises of Sadhdhathissa Maha Vidyala (latitude 07º 13' 28.5" N and longitude 081º 34' 22.1" E)	
Sagama Seya		Urakawattei	No. 11/C, Sagama	Thirukkovil	10 October 2014	(latitude 07º 08' 24" N and longitude 081º 49' 24" E)	
Sagama ruins			No. 11C, Sagama	Thirukkovil	10 October 2014	The site of archaeological ruins with evidences of ancient settlements in the land near Kalipotaru canal (latitude 07º 07' 59" N and longitude 081º 48' 00" E)	
Sagama ruins			Sagama	Thirukkovil	10 October 2014	Drip ledged cave situated in the road leads towards Sagama Wewa	
Sagama Wewa ruins		Sagama	No. 11C, Sagama	Thirukkovil	10 October 2014	Sluice of Sagama lake and nearby stone pillars and other archaeological ruins. (latitude 07º 07' 38" N and longitude 081º 48' 56" E)	
Sagama Wewa reservation ruins		Manankulama	Sagama	Thirukkovil	10 October 2014	Rock plain with archaeological evidence and signs situated near Rajawewa	
Samanabedda cave temple				Ampara			
Samangala Forest Hermitage		Samangala	No. W/104B/2, Bandaraduwa	Uhana	10 October 2014	Samangala mountain range with drip ledged cave complex containing inscriptions	
Samapura Pilleyar Kovil		Samapura	No. W/89/B, Samapura	Ampara	10 October 2014	Rock plain with chronicles at the premises of Pilleyar Kovil (latitude 07º 17' 16.5" N and longitude 081º 39' 53.6" E)	
Sambunagar ruins		Sambunagar	No. 05 Addalachchenei	Addalachchenai	10 October 2014	Hillock covering ancient Chaithya	
Sangaman Kanda Kattuchena reserve ruins			Kandiadi	Thirukkovil	10 October 2014	Ruins of a Buddhist Vihara complex and archaeological site with prehistoric evidence	
Sangaman Kanda ruins		Sangaman Kanda	Sangaman Kanda	Thirukkovil	10 October 2014	Rock plain with ruins of buildings near Sangaman Kanda Kattupillayar Kovil	
Sangaman Kanda ruins		Sangaman Kanda	No. P22 Sangaman Kanda	Pothuvil	10 October 2014	The rock boulder called Sangaman Kanda with hillock covering chaitya, ruins of buildings, prehistoric cave art, cave inscriptions and complex of drip ledged caves and other archaeological evidences (latitude 07º 01' 04.8" N and longitude 081º 50' 53.3" E)	
Sapanagar ruins		Sapanagar	No. 5-2-34-015 Eragama 02	Eragama	10 October 2014	Rock plain with rock inscription, place containing ruins of Dagoba and Kethukawata at 8th Mile Post (latitude 07º 12' 49" N and longitude 081º 44' 32" E)	
Saranagama ruins		Saranagama	No. 140/D, Saranagama	Padiyathalawa	10 October 2014	Premises with slag. (Premises adjoining Thalapitaoya from Demodara College) situated within latitude 07º 25' 004" N and longitude 081º 15' 945" E	
Sehunapura ruins		Sehunapura	No. SP 84C-005-07 Eragama	Eragama	10 October 2014	Two rock boulders with Kethukawata and other archaeological evidences and the land where ancient pieces of pottery are scattered belonging to Sehunapura village (from the east of Eragama lake) (latitude 7º 14' 45" N and longitude 081º 44' 50" E)	
Sellak Oya ruins		Meegahapallama	Dewalahinda W/26/E	Damana	10 October 2014	The site of ruins with hillocks covering Chaithyas, building site with stone pillars, flight of steps in the place called “Sellak Oya” (latitude 07º 17976' N and longitude 081º 56398' E)	
Sengamuwa army camp ruins		Sengamuwa	Pansalgoda	Lahugala	10 October 2014	Site of ruins with stone pillars and buildings, located at the premises of Sengamuwa Army Camp (latitude 06º 88438' N and longitude 081º 76309' E)	
Sengamuwa ruins		Sengamuwa	Victor estate 02 P 17	Pothuvil	10 October 2014	Rock plain with stairways, signs of chisel holing and other archaeological evidences (latitude 6º 53' 37" N and longitude 81º 46 00' E)	
Serankada Purana Vihara			No. 137/A, Serankada	Padiyathalawa	26 December 2014	The two places with ruins of buildings and other archaeological evidences at Ancient Temple premises (latitude 07º 27' 165" N and longitude 81º 16' 660" E)	
Shasthrawela Vihara		Shasthrawela	No. PP 06 Panama North	Lahugala	10 October 2014	Small rock (crocodile rock) with drip ledged caves, flight of steps, ruins of an ancient stupa at coastal belt situated towards east from Shasthrawela Vihara premises (latitude 06º 80998' N and longitude 081º 82424' E)	
Sir Swami Vipulananda house		Karthivu	Karthivu 01	Karativu	26 December 2014		
Somawathi Abhayapura Idama ruins		Abhayapura	No. W/88C/01/275, Abhayapura	Uhana	10 October 2014	Rock with the hillock of ancient Dagoba at the place	
Sri Chandimarama Purana Vihara		Serupitiya	No. 142, Serupitiya	Dehiattakandiya	26 December 2014	Other archaeological relics including ancient shrine with stone statue of Buddha and stone pillars at the premises	
Sri Dharmendrarama Raja Maha Vihara		Mayadunne	No. W/04A/055, Mayadunne	Uhana	10 October 2014	Rock inscription, places with ruins of buildings and other archaeological evidences in vihara premises. (latitude 07º 25' 32.1" N and longitude 081º 37' 58.3" E)	
Sri Sumanarama Vihara, Weheragama		Weheragama	No. W/94A/3-115, Weheragama West	Uhana	26 December 2014	Natural rock plane with archeological evidences including ruins of buildings, drains, chisel holing, small stone ponds at the premises	
Sri Suvusudhdharmara Vihara, Moragahapallama			Moragahapallama	Damana	26 December 2014	Drip ledged cave (latitude 07º 20' 85.4" N and longitude 81º 60' 62.9" E)	
Sthree Gala			Panama South	Lahugala	10 October 2014	Rock called “Sthree Gala” with drip ledged caves, ponds, flight of steps, buildings and other archaeological evidences scattered in the surrounding area	
Sudagala pond		Wattamadu	No. 11C, Sagama	Thirukkovil	10 October 2014	The pond situated on the rock called Sudugala (latitude 07º 07' 13" N and longitude 081º 46' 06" E)	
Sudharshanarama Vihara		Colony 33 village	No. W/08J/270, Navagiriyawa	Uhana	10 October 2014	Rock with archaeological evidences such as stone pillars, stone tablets, stone, flower stones and treasure stones at the premises	
Tempitiya Wewa		Tempitiya	Tempitiya	Mahaoya	10 October 2014	Tempitiya Lake with the ancient bund of the lake, Bisokotuwa and sluice	
Thalapitaoya ruins		Thalapitaoya South	No. 140/B, Thalapitaoya south	Padiyathalawa	26 December 2014	The place with ruins of buildings with stone pillars and rock plane with Brahmi inscriptions in the village (latitude 07º 23' 811" N and longitude 81º 15' 867" E)	
Thangavelavipuram reserve ruins			Thangavelavipuram	Thirukkovil	10 October 2014	Site with ruins of Buddhist Monastery complex with rock inscription	
Thangavelawipuram ruins		Thangavelawipuram	Thangavelavipuram	Thirukkovil	10 October 2014	Rock plain with archaeological evidences	
Tharulengala Aranya Senasana		Hulannuge	No. PP 11 Hulannuge	Lahugala	10 October 2014	Karandahela amountain range with cave inscriptions of Tharulengala Aranya Senasana, cave complex with ancient art and drip ledged caves, building site with stone pillars, inscriptions, hillock covering dagoba and stairways and other archaeological evidences (latitude 06º 92763' N and longitude 081º 65491' E)	
Third mile post ruins			Victor Estate 02-P-17	Pothuvil	10 October 2014	A Monastery complex with ruins of an old dagoba and remaining of buildings situated at third mile post (latitude 06º 52' 56" N and longitude 081º 47' 36" E)	
Thiruwaliwarpuram ruins		Thiruwaliwarpuram	No. 89, Thiruwaliwarpuram Malwaththa 01	Samanthurai	26 December 2014	Rock plane with archeological evidences (latitude 07º 19' 55" N and longitude 081º 44' 5 1" E); Settlement with stone pillars, stone tablets, inscriptions, ancient pottery pieces, remains of scattered tile and bricks belonging to Thiruwaliwarpuram Village (latitude 07º 32' 81.9" N and longitude 081º 74' 98.2" E)	
Thissa Purana Raja Maha Vihara		Rathupas Uhana	Unuwathura Bubula	Mahaoya	10 October 2014	Rock plain with other archaeological remains and flight of steps including hillock of ancient Chaitya, all places with the ruins of buildings at the premises (latitude 07º 57573' N and longitude 081º 35059' E)	
Thiththawel Mandiya Welyaya ruins			Lahugala PP 10	Lahugala	10 October 2014	The site containing ruins of buildings with stone pillars and other archaeological remains (latitude 06º 86725' N and longitude 081º 70942' E)	
Thonikal Kandam ruins		Thonikal Kandam	No. 11C, Sagama	Thirukkovil	10 October 2014	Buddhist Monastery complex with hillock covering of stupa, drip ledged caves, rock inscriptions and ruins of buildings (latitude 07º 07' 49" N and longitude 081º 46' 33" E)	
Udayagiri Raja Maha Vihara		Udagirigama	No. W/88B, Udagirigama Eas	Uhana	26 December 2014	Site with the evidences of buildings with stone pillars, all archaeological relics such as Stupa chatra, Balustardes, Moonstone and flower altar at the premises	
Udayapura Piller Inscription and other ruins		Mihindupura	No. W/89/N, Mihindupura	Ampara	10 October 2014	Udayapura Piller inscription with archaeological evidences in the surrounding area, rocks (with Chisel holing) and place where pieces of ancient pottery are scattered at the place called Pansalwatta (latitude 07º 17' 35.8" N and longitude 081º 42' 04.5" E)	
Uraniya ruins		Uraniya	No. P/25, Kanakarakiramam	Pothuvil	26 December 2014	Brick wall and archaeological evidences found in nearby area in the land called Suddage waththa (latitude 06º 53' 59" N and longitude 81º 50' 34" E)	
Uththara Jayamaha Vihara		Hingurana	No. W/27/F, Karalewa	Damana	26 December 2014	Caves with drip ledges and inscriptions (latitude 07º 22' 14.5" N and longitude 81º 67' 93.3" E)	
Uthurupaw archaeological site		Bokkebedda	No. W/102/1085, Walagampura	Uhana	10 October 2014	Madankanda mountain range with drip ledged cave complex with inscriptions and the hillock of ancient stupa at the foot of the mountain range at the archaeological site	
Veddagala Archaeological ruins		Mollikulam		Addalachchenai	31 December 1999	Ancient caves with drip ledge and other ruins of ancient buildings at Veddagala rock	
Veeradi Amuna		Neinakadu		Addalachchenai	31 December 1999	Old Bund called Veeraadi Amuna crossed the Gal Oya	
Veheragala archaeological ruins		Veheragala, Maha Oya		Maha Oya	6 July 2007	Ancient Bodhigaraya, image house, pond with naga symbol, ancient rampart, Dathumandira, Poyage, Dagoba and the cave	
Veheragala archaeological site		Dighavapi		Addalachchenai	31 December 1999	Stone inscription and other ruins in veheragala rock	
Veheragala caves		Dighavapi colony	No. 1 Dighavapi	Addalachchenai	10 October 2014	Drip ledged cave complex with Brahmi inscriptions extended from the area near Sinhala College up to archaeological site “Veheragala”	
Veheragala ruins		Buddhist colony	No. 1 Dighavapi	Addalachchenai	10 October 2014	Rock with rock inscriptions, ruins of buildings and flight of steps and the pond with stone rampart wall at the base of the said rock at the place called “Veheragala”	
Veheragala ruins		Aligambe	Aligambe	Alayadiwembu	10 October 2014	The rock plain called Veheragala with hillock covering old Chaitya, ruins of buildings, stairways, rock inscription, pond and other scattered archaeological evidences (latitude 07º 64090' N and longitude 081º 76' 565' E)	
Veheragala ruins		colony No. 19A	W/25/C Weheragala	Damana	10 October 2014	Rock with archaeological ruins (latitude 07º 14166' N and longitude 081º 77674' E)	
Veheragoda ruins		Thalapita Oya South	No. 140/B, Thalapita Oya South	Padiyathalawa	10 October 2014	Ruins with the Hillock of stupa and pillars at the place (latitude 07º 23' 315" N and longitude 081º 15' 913" E)	
Vehera godella ruins		Samapura	No. W/89/B, Samapura	Ampara	10 October 2014	Place with hillock with ancient stupa and Stone pillars at the place called Vehera godella (latitude 07º 17' 07.8" N and longitude 081º 39' 56.7" E)	
Veherakema Buddhist Religious Center		Kunukola	Panama South	Lahugala	10 October 2014	Rock with archaeological ruins including hillocks covering ancient chaithyas, ruins of buildings, ponds, flight of steps, inscriptions (latitude 06º 70028' N and longitude 081º 77635' E)	
Viharagala ruins		Kannakiramam	Kannkiramam No. 01 AV 20	Alayadiwembu	10 October 2014	The rock plain called Viharagala with hillock covering dagoba, stairways, water canals and other scattered archaeological evidence (latitude 07 17702' N and longitude 081º 80 766' E)	
Wadinagala forest reservation ruins		15th mile post village	Wadinagala	Damana	10 October 2014	Ruins of buildings with stone pillars within forest reservation (latitude 07º 10557' N and longitude 081º 55160' E)	
Wahava ruins		Wahava	No. 139, Dorakumbura	Padiyathalawa	10 October 2014	Hillock of ancient stupa, ruins of buildings and other archaeological remains (latitude 07º 21' 609" N and longitude 081º 18' 419" E)	
Walathapitiya ruins			No. 89B, Walathapitiya 01	Samanthurai	26 December 2014	Rock plane with grinding places and other archaeological evidences in the paddy field, Pudukkadu (latitude 07º 18' 50.0" N and longitude 81º 43' 48.9" E)	
Walathapitiya Wewa road ruins			No. 89B, Walathapitiya 01	Samanthurai	26 December 2014	Rock plane with sign of quarry at Walathapitiya lake road (latitude 07º 18' 42.6" N and longitude 081º 43' 17.7" E)	
Walathapitiya Wewa ruins		Wilwewa	No. 89B, Walathapitiya 011	Samanthurai	10 October 2014	The premises with stone pillars, relics of ancient bricks and pieces of tiles (premises bounded North-east by outer canal of Walathapitiya lake, South and West by paddy field, North-west by the bund of the lake) situated towards South-east from the spill of Walathapitiya lake (latitude 07º 19' 23.5" N and longitude 081º 43' 30.9" E)	
Wandagama ruins		Wandagama-Gamagoda	No. PP 02 Panama South	Lahugala	10 October 2014	Site with archaeological ruins at "Wandagama" with ancient buildings (latitude 06º 74860' N and longitude 081º 77828' E)	
Waralanda road ruins		Lahugala	Perani Lahugala PP 10	Lahugala	10 October 2014	The site of ruins with stone pillars and other archaeological remains, at Waralanda road (latitude 06º 87330' N and longitude 081º 72224' E)	
Waralanda ruins		Waralanda	Waralanda	Lahugala	26 December 2014	Place of ruins with ancient stone pillars in a land near the causeway on Lahugala-Kiriwehera road belonging to Waralanda village (latitude 06º 87' 208" N and longitude 81º 72' 11.9" E)	
Wattamadu ruins		Wattamadu	No. 11C, Sagama	Thirukkovil	10 October 2014	Building complex with ruins with places consists of ruined buildings, stupas and stone remains at the place called Wattamadu (latitude 07º 06' 29" N and longitude 081º 45' 45" E)	
Wavinna Gewal Hatha ruins		Wavinna Gewal Hatha	No. W/86/E, Wavinna	Ampara	26 December 2014	Rock plane with rock inscription and evidences of the construction of ancient buildings (latitude 07º 14' 089" N and longitude 81º 14' 58.5" E)	
Weeragoda Purana Gale Vihara		Weeragoda	No. W/93C/420, Weeragoda North	Uhana	10 October 2014	Site of buildings with the hillock of ancient Dagoba and stone pillars, moonstone and balustrades (Korawakgala) at the surrounding	
Weeragoda Purana Gale Vihara		Weeragoda	No. W/93C/4-220, Weeragoda North	Uhana	26 December 2014	Rock plane with hillock of Chaithya, ruins of a shrine and base pockets of pillars at the premises (latitude 07º22' 48.7" N and longitude 081º 41' 29.9" E)	
Weheragala Aranya Senasanaya		Weheragala	Unuwathura Bubula	Mahaoya	10 October 2014	Weheragalakanda with all other archaeological remains including cave inscriptions and all drip ledged caves, rock inscriptions, hillock of Dagoba, flight of steps and chronicles at the premises (latitude 07º 77790' N and longitude 081º 35448' E)	
Weheragala rock ruins		Bandaraduwa	No. W/104B/2, Bandaraduwa	Uhana	10 October 2014	Weheragala rock plain with archaeological evidences including hillock of Dagaba, rock inscriptions and, flight of steps	
Weheragoda ruins		Kudalakatuwa	Tempitiya	Mahaoya	10 October 2014	Weheragoda site of ruins with four hillocks of ancient Chaityas, places containing buildings with stone pillars and other archaeological remains (latitude 07º 60088' N and longitude 081º 41850' E)	
Wehera Goddella ruins		Weeranthalawa	Unuwathura Bubula	Mahaoya	10 October 2014	Hillock of ancient Chitya, places with the ruins of buildings and other archaeological remains (latitude 07º 39026' N and longitude 081º 79298' E)	
Wembeadikulam ruins		Wembeadikulam	No. 11C, Sagama	Thirukkovil	10 October 2014	Natural rock plain with flight of steps and base stones at the Eastern end of forest reservations (latitude 07º 05' 42" N and longitude 081º 43' 54" E); Rock with prehistoric evidences and ruins of Buddhist Monastery complex situated on the North-East from the lake called Wembeadikulam (latitude 07º 05' 34" N and longitude 081º 43' 40" E)	
Weppeadikulam ruins		Weppeadikulam	No. 11C, Sagama	Thirukkovil	10 October 2014	Archaeological site with ruins of buildings in Weppeadikulam reserve; Rock plain with archaeological evidence in Weppeadikulam reserve. (latitude 07º 05' 22" N and longitude 081º 42' 58" E)	
Werankotagoda Agrarian Services office ruins		Werankotagoda	No. W/104A/005, Mayadunna	Uhana	26 December 2014	Site with other archaeological evidences including the building with laid down stone tablets and the wall around the building situated towards south from Agrarian Services office (latitude 07º 25' 12" N and longitude 081º 37' 16" E)	
Wiranathalawa ruins		Wiranathalawa	Unuwathurabubula	Maha Oya	26 December 2014	Site of the ruins with hillock of ancient Chaithya, ruins of buildings and plight of steps (latitude 07º 56' 52.3' N and longitude 081º 34' 26.3" E); Rock plane with chronicles and marks of Watapatha in the middle of paddy field (latitude 07º 56' 97.28" N and longitude 081º 34' 270" E)	
Wewe Vehera		Mangalagama	Panama South	Lahugala	10 October 2014	The monastery Complex, where the ruins of ancient buildings hillocks covering Chaithyas, inscriptions, caves, ponds and archaeological evidences are scattered, at the place called “Wewevehera” (latitude 06º 74409' N and longitude 081º 77817' E)	
Yalpotha Wewa ruins		Bogahalanda	Pansalgoda PP 07	Lahugala	10 October 2014	Rock plain with ancient chisel holing located towards North West to the Yalpotha tank (06º 86944' N and 081º 73777' E)	
Yalpotha Wewa sluice		Bogahalanda	Pansalgoda	Lahugala	10 October 2014	Ancient sluice and break water of Yalpotha tank (latitude 06º 86940' N and longitude 081º 74312' E)	
Yannai Paambulakanda ruins		Aalimnahar	No. AP/20A/4 Aalimnahar	Akkaraipattu	10 October 2014	The site with caves built on the rock at the place called “Yannai Paambulakanda” (latitude 071º 94' 93" N and longitude 081º 78' 21.4" E)	
