= Thimbirigolla Grama Niladhari Division =

Thimbirigolla
- Grama Niladhari Division
- Interactive map of Thimbirigolla
- Coordinates: 7.151871°N 81.652612°E
- Country: Sri Lanka
- Province: Eastern Province
- District: Ampara District
- Divisional Secretariat: Damana Divisional Secretariat
- Electoral District: Digamadulla Electoral District
- Polling Division: Pothuvil Polling Division

Area
  - Total: 29.45 km^{2} (11.37 sq mi)
- Elevation: 67 m (220 ft)

Population (2012)
  - Total: 1,309
  - Density: 44/km^{2} (110/sq mi)
- ISO 3166 code: LK-5242125

Thimbirigolla

Thimbirigolla Grama Niladhari Division is a Grama Niladhari Division of the Damana Divisional Secretariat of Ampara District of Eastern Province, Sri Lanka . It has Grama Niladhari Division Code W/24C.

Thimbirigolla is a surrounded by the Wadinagala, Ambalanoya, Ekgaloya, Kumana, Madana, Pannalgama, Madawalalanda and Thottama Grama Niladhari Divisions.

== Demographics ==
=== Ethnicity ===
The Thimbirigolla Grama Niladhari Division has a Sinhalese majority (99.9%) . In comparison, the Damana Divisional Secretariat (which contains the Thimbirigolla Grama Niladhari Division) has a Sinhalese majority (99.5%)

Ethnicity in Thimbirigolla
1. Sinhalese (99.9%)
2. Other (0.10%)

=== Religion ===
The Thimbirigolla Grama Niladhari Division has a Buddhist majority (99.8%) . In comparison, the Damana Divisional Secretariat (which contains the Thimbirigolla Grama Niladhari Division) has a Buddhist majority (99.0%)

Religion in Thimbirigolla
1. Buddhist (99.8%)
2. Other (0.20%)
