= Padawala =

- Village
- Location within Sri Lanka Location within South Asia Location within Asia
- Coordinates: 7°29′N 81°14′E
- Country: Sri Lanka
- Province: Eastern Province
- District: Ampara District
- Divisional Secretariat: Padiyathalawa Divisional Secretariat
- Grama Niladhari: Galode
- Time zone: UTC+5:30 (Sri Lanka Time)

Padawala is a village in Padiyathalawa Divisional Secretariat, Ampara District, Eastern Province, Sri Lanka.
