= Hidayapuram 1 Grama Niladhari Division =

Hidayapuram 1
- Grama Niladhari Division
- Interactive map of Hidayapuram 1
- Coordinates: 6.897090°N 81.840844°E
- Country: Sri Lanka
- Province: Eastern Province
- District: Ampara District
- Divisional Secretariat: Pothuvil Divisional Secretariat
- Electoral District: Digamadulla Electoral District
- Polling Division: Pothuvil Polling Division

Area
  - Total: 6.42 km^{2} (2.48 sq mi)
- Elevation: 2 m (6.6 ft)

Population (2012)
  - Total: 1,554
  - Density: 242/km^{2} (630/sq mi)
- ISO 3166 code: LK-5248105

Hidayapuram 1

Hidayapuram 1 Grama Niladhari Division is a Grama Niladhari Division of the Pothuvil Divisional Secretariat of Ampara District of Eastern Province, Sri Lanka. It has Grama Niladhari Division Code P/20.

Hidayapuram 1 is a surrounded by the Kanagarkiramam, Hidayapuram 2, Rasak Moulana Nagar and Hijra Nagar Grama Niladhari Divisions.

== Demographics ==
=== Ethnicity ===
The Hidayapuram 1 Grama Niladhari Division has a Moor majority (99.4%). In comparison, the Pothuvil Divisional Secretariat (which contains the Hidayapuram 1 Grama Niladhari Division) has a Moor majority (78.2%) and a significant Sri Lankan Tamil population (18.8%)

Ethnicity in Hidayapuram 1
1. Moor (99.4%)
2. Other (0.60%)

=== Religion ===
The Hidayapuram 1 Grama Niladhari Division has a Muslim majority (99.4%). In comparison, the Pothuvil Divisional Secretariat (which contains the Hidayapuram 1 Grama Niladhari Division) has a Muslim majority (78.2%) and a significant Hindu population (15.5%)

Religion in Hidayapuram 1
1. Muslim (99.4%)
2. Other (0.60%)
