= Tempitiya =

- Village
- Location within Sri Lanka
- Coordinates: 07.597416°N 81.431519°E
- Country: Sri Lanka
- Province: Eastern Province
- District: Ampara District
- Divisional Secretariat: Mahaoya Divisional Secretariat
- Established: 1880

Population
  - Estimate (2024): 705
- Time zone: UTC+5:30 (Sri Lanka Standard Time Zone)
- Postal Code: 32072

Tempitiya (Sinhala: ටැම්පිටිය, Tamil: தெம்பிட்டிய) is a village in Mahaoya in the Ampara District, Eastern Province, Sri Lanka. It is located nearly 12 kilometres (7 mi) away from the town of Mahaoya, along the Peradeniya-Badulla-Chenkalady Highway (A5 Road).

== History ==
Tempitiya is an ancient agricultural village in the Mahaoya Divisional Secretariat surrounded by the villages of Dumana, Pulawala, Kosgolla and Periyapullumalai. This village is built based on the Tempitiya Reservoir and the Tempitiya Rajamaha Viharaya which lies opposite the reservoir both of which are credited to King Saddha Tissa (137-119 BC) of Anuradhapura kingdom who was the regional ruler of the Digamadulla during the reign of King Dutugemunu.

Tempitiya Reservoir
Tempitiya Reservoir is said to have been restored by the British in 1838 making it one of the first ancient reservoirs to be restored by the British in the Ampara District. The ancient bunt, bisokotuwa the sluice gate of the Tempitiya Reservoir was declared as a protected archaeological site.

== Education ==
=== Schools ===
- Tempitiya Maha Vidyalaya

== Healthcare ==
=== Hospitals ===
- Primary Medical Care Unit (PMCU) - Tempitiya

The nearest larger hospital:

- Base Hospital - Mahaoya

== Religious Places ==
- Tempitiya Rajamaha Viharaya

Tempitiya Rajamaha Viharaya (Sinhala: ටැම්පිටිය රජමහා විහාරය) ruins that are believed to belong to the King Saddha Tissa's era have been found at this site. These ruins include a carving of a seven-hooded cobra with Bahirawa figures, granite Buddha statues, moonstones and different forms of Korawak Gal. The ruins of Tempitiya Rajamaha Viharaya was declared as an archaeologically protected site on October 10, 2014.

- Paththini Devalaya (Sinhala: ටැම්පිටිය ඓතිහාසික පත්තිනි දේවාලය)

== Transport ==
Tempitiya has a public transport system based primarily on buses.
From Mahaoya, travel 10 km along the Peradeniya-Badulla-Chenkalady Highway (A5 Road) via 69 Junction, Bedirekka, Pulawala and turn left before the 239th Mile post.

== Nearby Attractions ==
- Tempitiya Reservoir Ancient Bisokotuwa and Sluice
- Archaeological Ruins of Tempitiya Rajamaha Viharaya
- Niyandawaragala Archaeological Ruins
- Kapurella Hotwater Spring
