= Lahugala Kota Vehera =

Ancient Buddhist temple in Sri Lanka

Lahugala Kota Vehara
- ලාහුගල කොට වෙහෙර
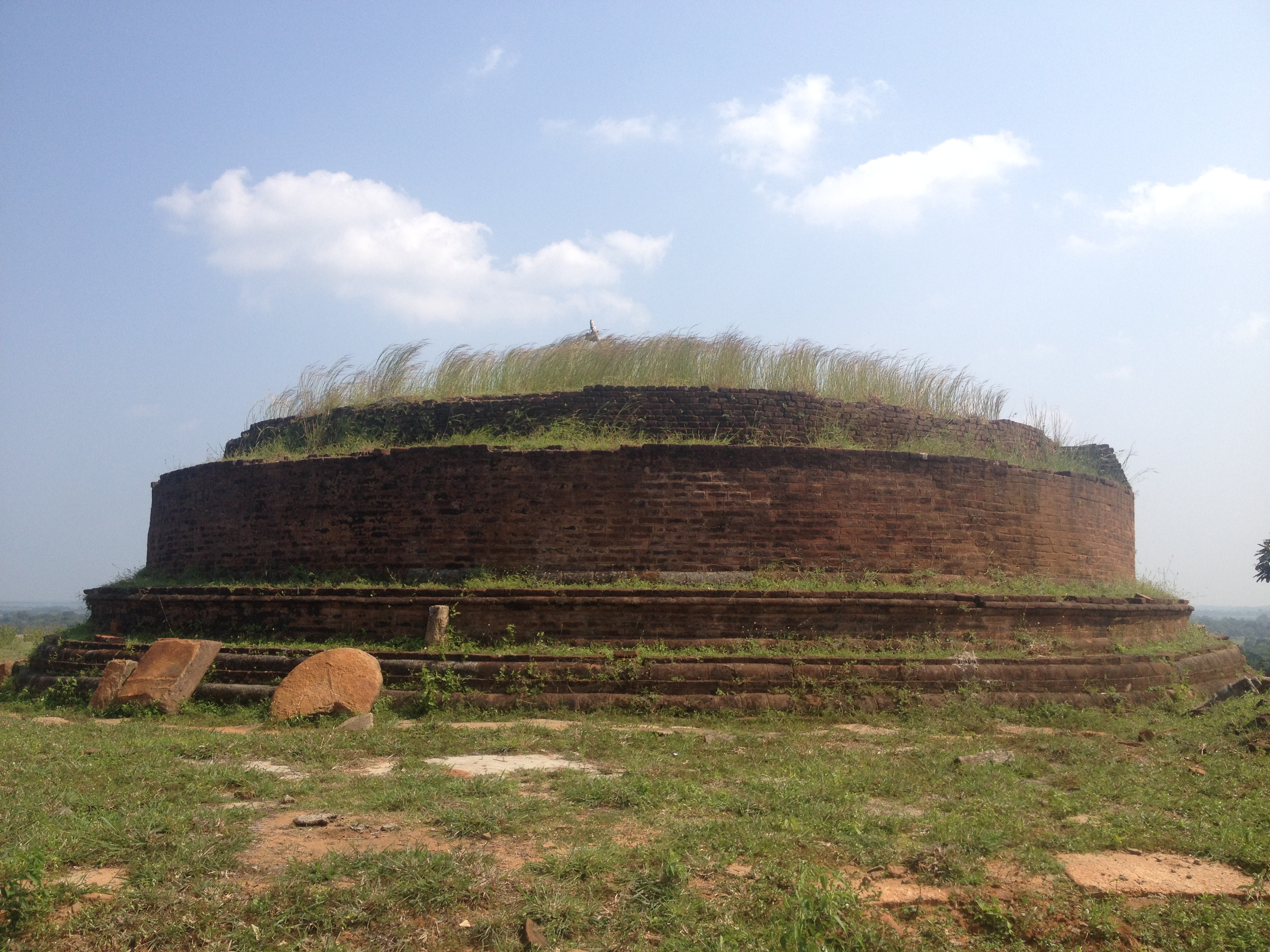

Religion
- Affiliation: Buddhism
- District: Ampara
- Province: Eastern Province

Location
- Location: Lahugala, Sri Lanka
- Interactive map of Lahugala Kota Vehara
- Coordinates: 06°52′41.1″N 81°45′10.6″E

Architecture
- Type: Buddhist Temple
- Official name: APMSL
- Designated: 10 October 2014

Lahugala Kota Vehera (Sinhalaː ලාහුගල කොට වෙහෙර) or Kota Vehara Raja Maha Vihara is an ancient Buddhist temple situated in Lahugala, Ampara District, Sri Lanka. The temple is located in Pansalgoda Grama Niladari division of Lahugala DS and lies on Colombo - Batticaloa main road about 10 km (6.2 mi) far from Pothuvil town. The temple has been formally recognised by the Government as an archaeological site in Sri Lanka. The designation was declared on 10 October 2014 under the government Gazette number 1884. The protected monuments include the ancient Dagaba, building sites with stone pillars, flight of steps carved on natural rock plain and drip ledged caves. The Stupa in the Vihara has been identified as one of four Kota Vehera Styled structures found around Sri Lanka.

== Kota Vehera inscriptions ==
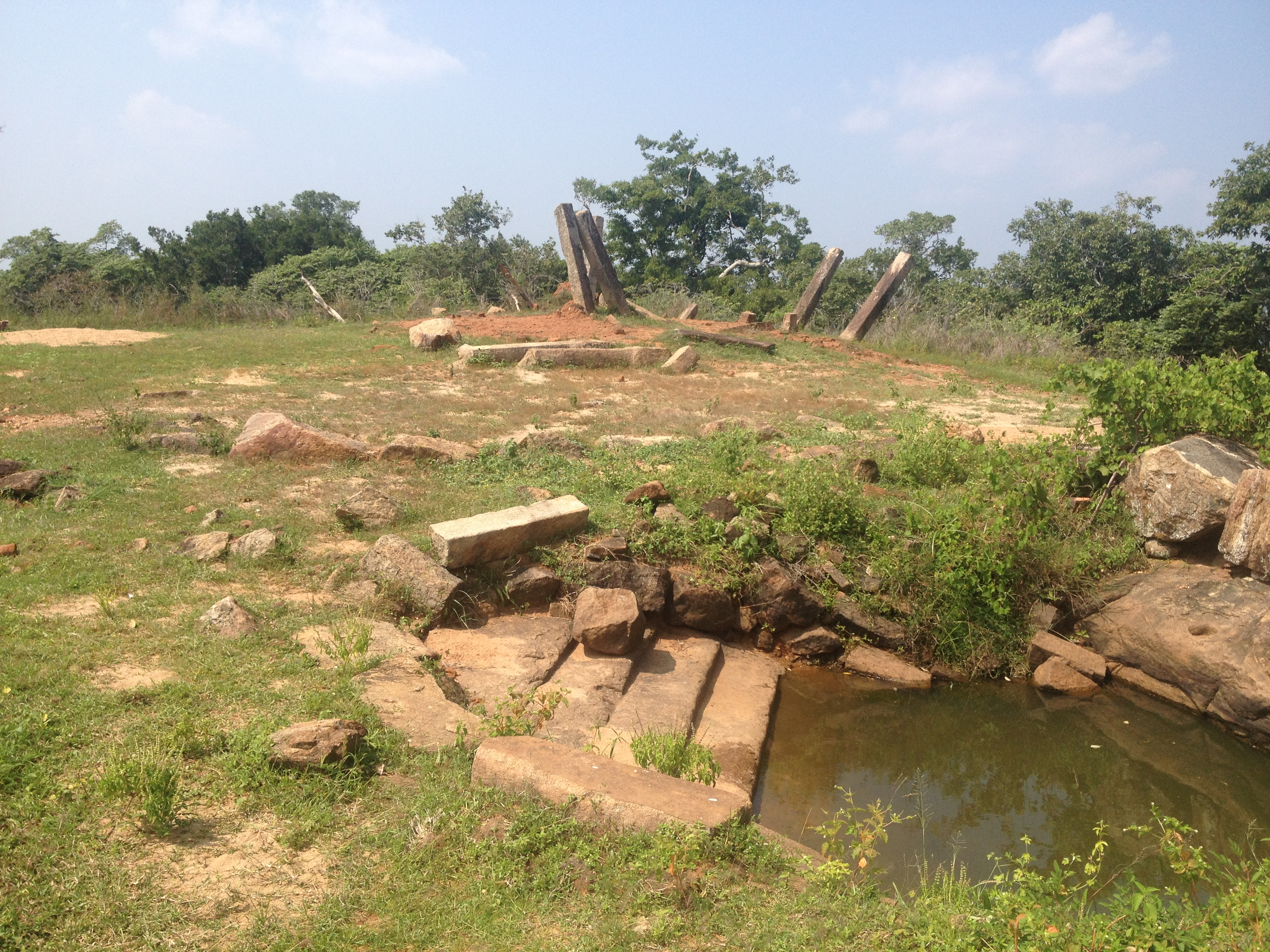
Ruins of an ancient pond and image house

=== Inscription no. 1 ===
Reign: Bhathika Tissa (19 BC - 9 AD)
Period: 1st century AD
Script: Later Brahmi
Language: Old Sinhala
Text: Siddham! Devanapiyatisa rajaha marumakanakaha Kutakana rajaha puta Gamini Abaya......
Content: "Hail! Gamini Abhaya, son of Kutakanna Tissa, grandson of king Devanampiya Tissa......"

=== Inscription no. 2 ===
Reign: Gajabahu I (112 - 134)
Period: 2nd century AD
Script: Later Brahmi
Language: Old Sinhala
Content: "Sabaya, the minister of king Gamini Abhaya (Gajaba) having exempted from taxes the hundred karises (400 amunas) of paddy land under Digalaka tank, donated it to Digalaka Vihara. Furthermore ten karises (40 amunas) of paddy land were offered for the activities of the Cetiya and one karisa (4 amunas) has been donated for lighiting lamp at the Stupa"

== See also ==
- Dadigama Kota Vehera
- Deliwala Kota Vehera
- Damila Maha Seya
