= Lahugala Kiri Vehera =

- ලාහුගල කිරි වෙහෙර
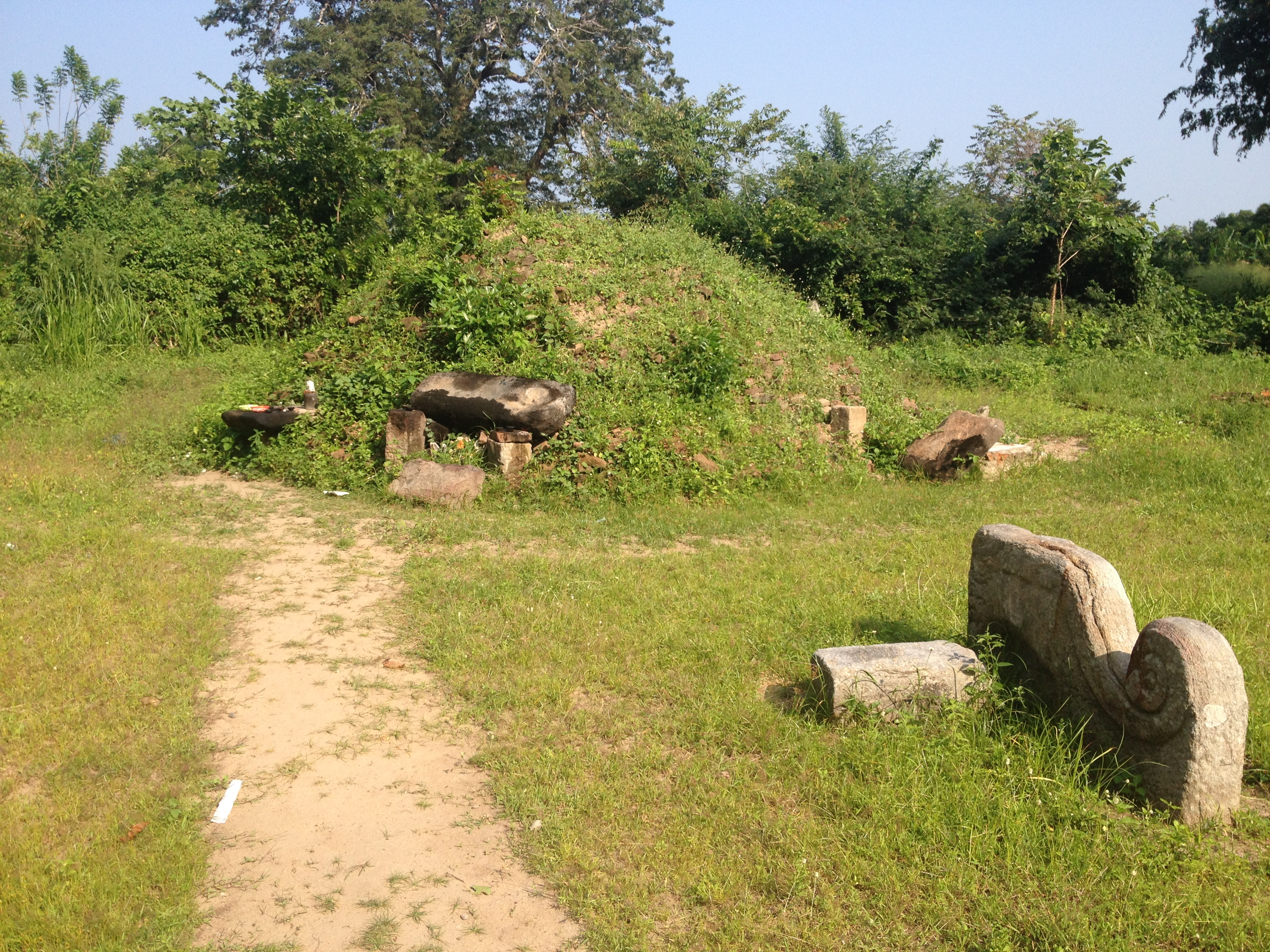
- The ruined Stupa and a Korawak Gala

Religion
- Affiliation: Buddhism
- District: Ampara
- Province: Eastern Province

Location
- Location: Lahugala, Sri Lanka
- Interactive map of Lahugala Kiri Vehera
- Coordinates: 06°52′11.7″N 81°43′11.0″E

Architecture
- Type: Buddhist Temple
- Archaeological Protected Monument of Sri Lanka
- Designated: 10 October 2014

Lahugala Kiri Vehera (Sinhala: ලාහුගල කිරි වෙහෙර) or Kiri Vehera Viharaya is an ancient Buddhist temple situated in Lahugala, Ampara District, Sri Lanka. The temple is located in Perani Lahugala Grama Niladari division of Lahugala DS. It is believed that this temple is belonged to the reign of king Dappula I (661–664). The temple has been formally recognised by the Government as an archaeological site in Sri Lanka. The designation was declared on 10 October 2014 under the government Gazette number 1884.

== Notes ==
- "PART I : SECTION (I) — GENERAL Government Notifications" (PDF). The Gazette of the Democratic Socialist Republic of Sri Lanka. 1884. 10 October 2014. Archived from the original (PDF) on 22 June 2019.
