= Konduwattuwana Wewa =

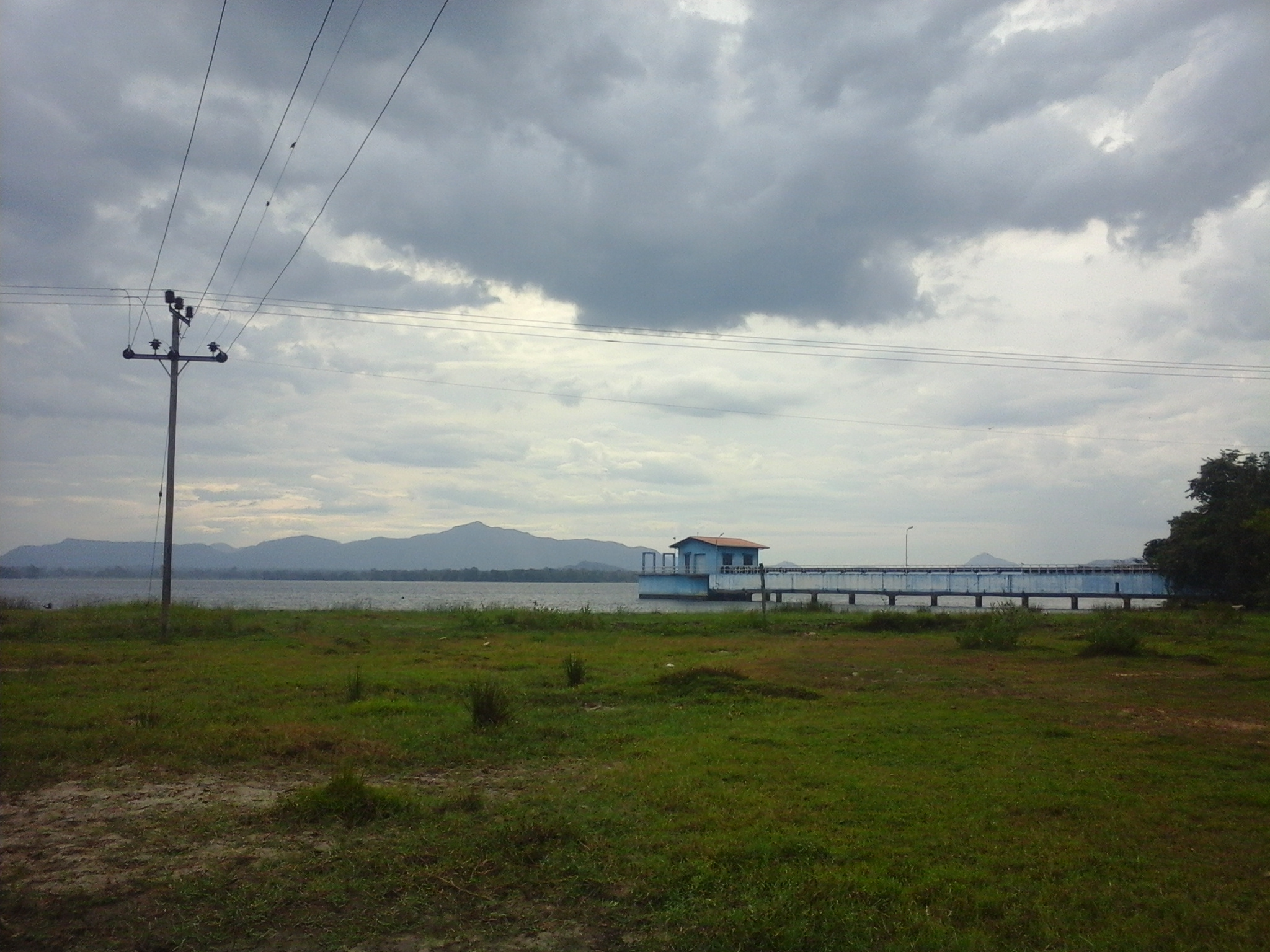

- Location within Sri Lanka
- Location: Ampara
- Coordinates: 7°17′34.2″N 81°38′06.1″E
- Type: Irrigation Reservoir
- Catchment area: 358 ha (880 acres)
- Basin countries: Sri Lanka
- Surface area: 45 ha (110 acres)

Konduwattuwana Wewa (Sinhalese: කොණ්ඩුවටුවාන ජලාශය) or Kondawattuwana Wewa is an ancient reservoir located in Ampara, Sri Lanka. The reservoir lies on the Ampara – Inginiyagala main road, approximately 4 km (2.5 mi) away from the town of Ampara. The site with ancient Buddhist ruins belonging to the Konduwattuwana reservoir area is formally recognised as an archaeological site in Sri Lanka.

The reservoir, Kondawattuwana Wewa, was constructed between the 1st and 3rd centuries BCE, most likely under the patronage of King Vasabha (67–111 AD). According to a stone pillar inscription found near the reservoir, the irrigation water of this reservoir was taxed, along with the paddy fields during the reign of King Dappula IV (939 - 940). It also records certain immunities granted by the king in respect of a village named Äragama

The reservoir was renovated in 1912 to supply both irrigation and drinking water to nearby villages.

== Kondavattavan Tank Waterdrome ==
Kondavattavan Tank Waterdrome
- IATA: AFK; ICAO: none

Summary
- Serves: Ampara, Eastern Province, Sri Lanka
- Coordinates: 7°17′01″N 81°38′42″E
- Interactive map of Kondavattavan Tank Waterdrome

Kondavattavan Tank Waterdrome (IATA: AFK) is a seaplane base located on the reservoir. It was served previously by SriLankan AirTaxi.

== Gallery ==
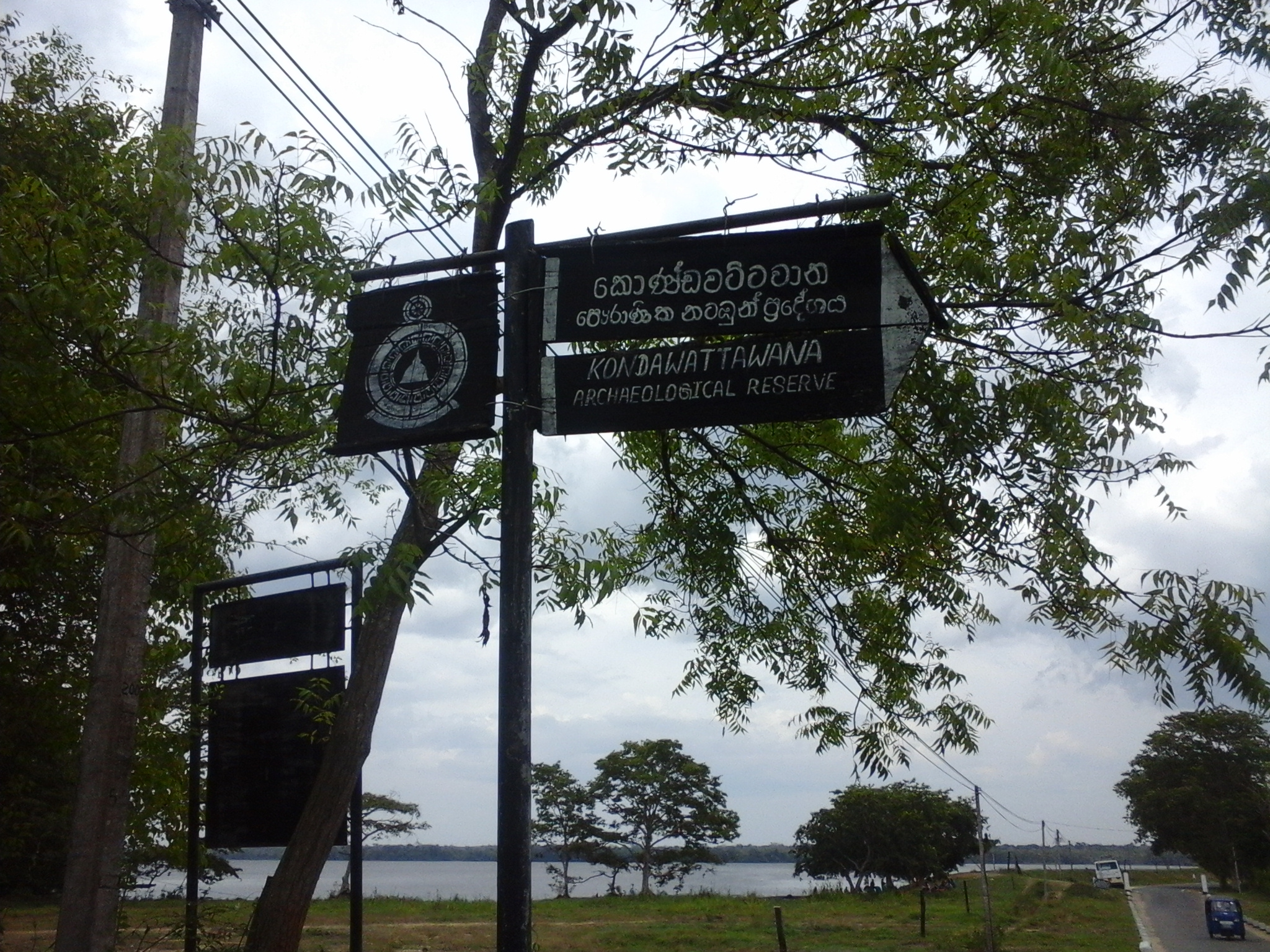

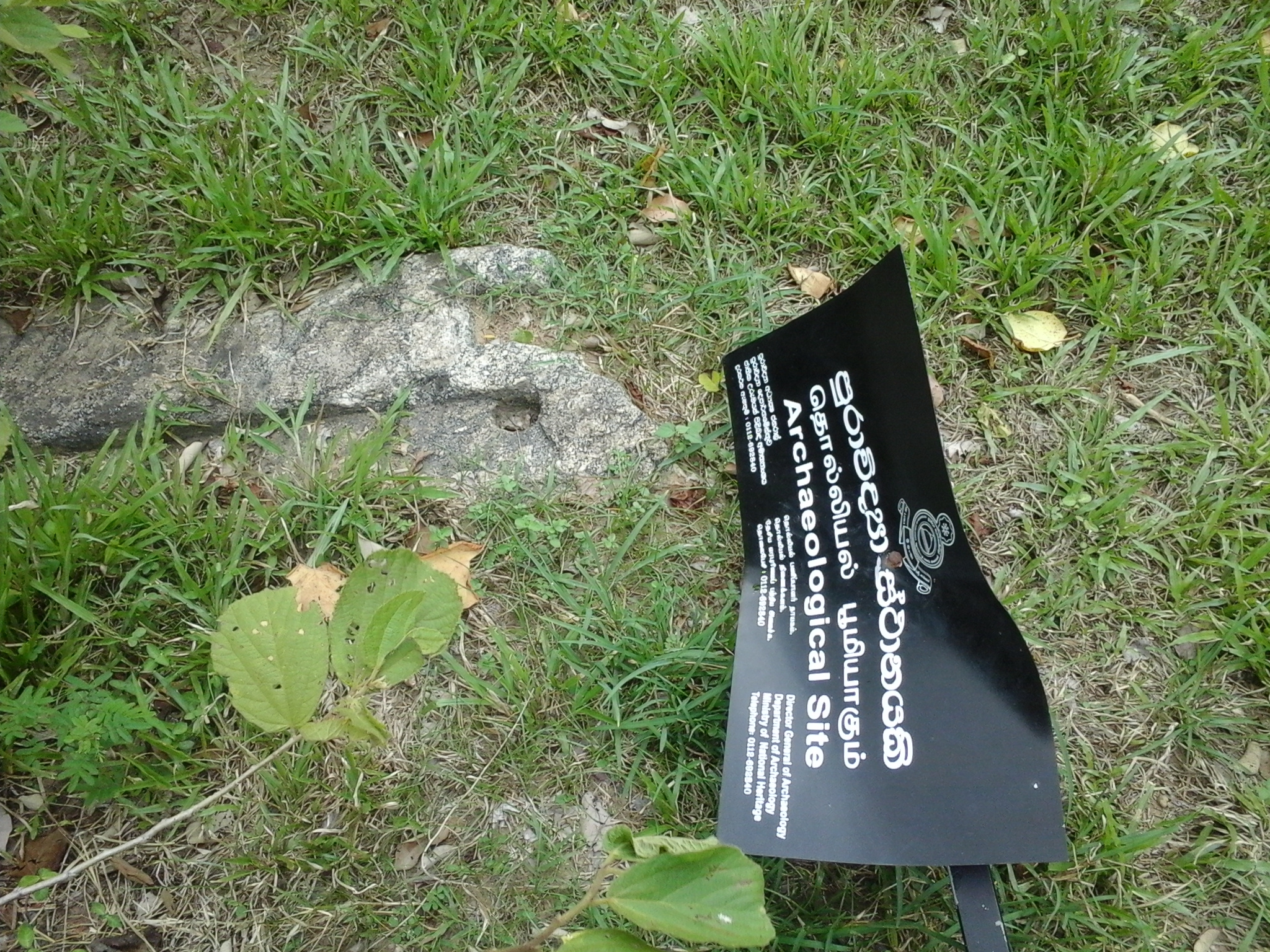

== See also ==
- List of Archaeological Protected Monuments in Ampara District
