= Ovagiriya =

Archeological site

Ovagiriya Archaeological Site
- ඔවාගිරිය පුරාවිද්‍යා භූමිය
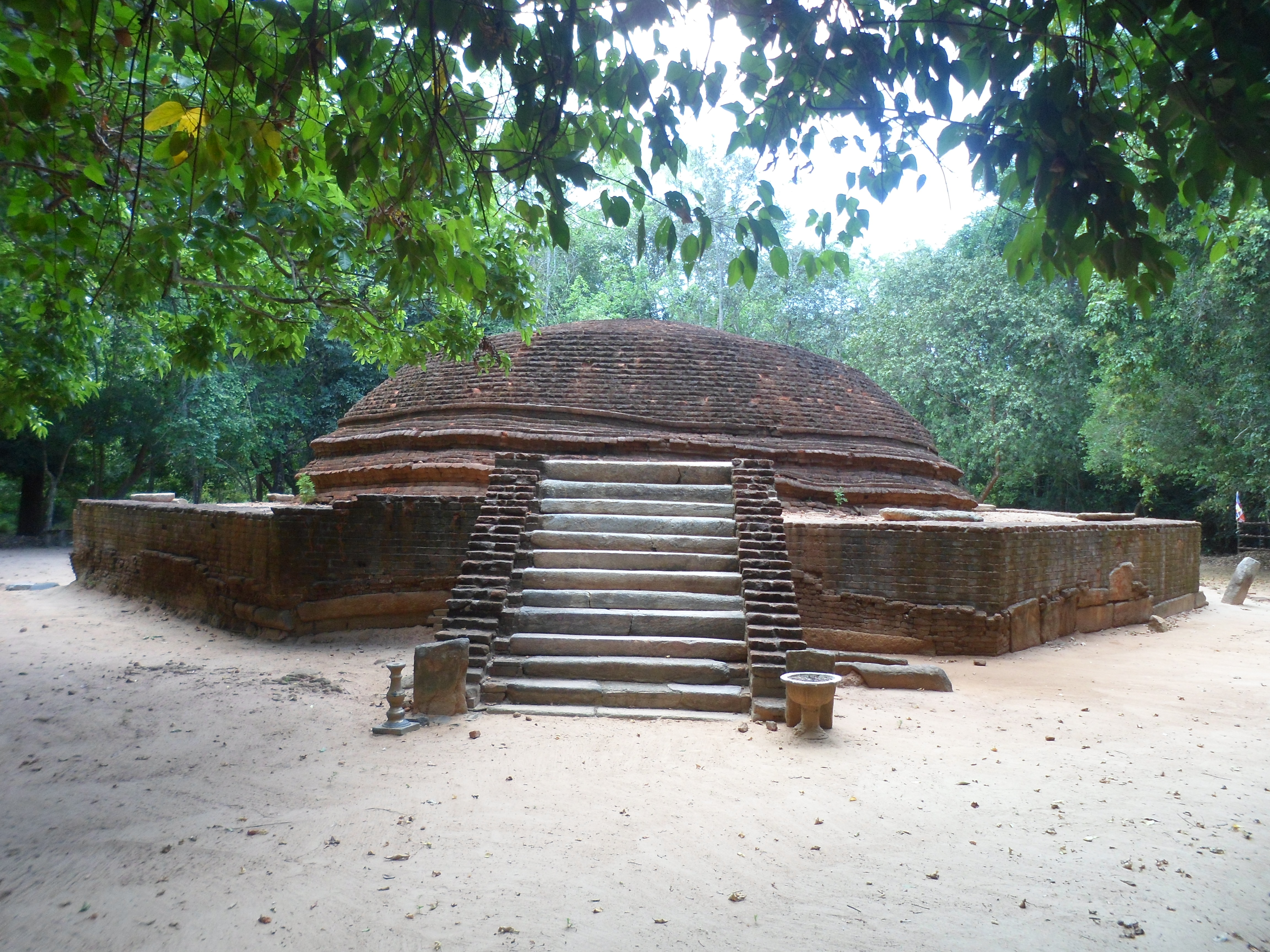
- The pagoda with unusual octagonal platform

- Location within Sri Lanka

Religion
- Affiliation: Buddhism
- District: Ampara
- Province: Eastern Province

Location
- Location: Ovagiriya, Sri Lanka
- Coordinates: 07°13′26.6″N 81°33′45.8″E

Architecture
- Type: Buddhist Temple
- Archaeological Protected Monument of Sri Lanka

Ovagiriya (ඔවාගිරිය පුරාවිද්‍යා භූමිය) is one of archaeological sites in Polwatta, Ampara District, Sri Lanka. It is situated on Ampara-Inginiyagala road, about 19 km (12 mi) away from Ampara.

== History ==
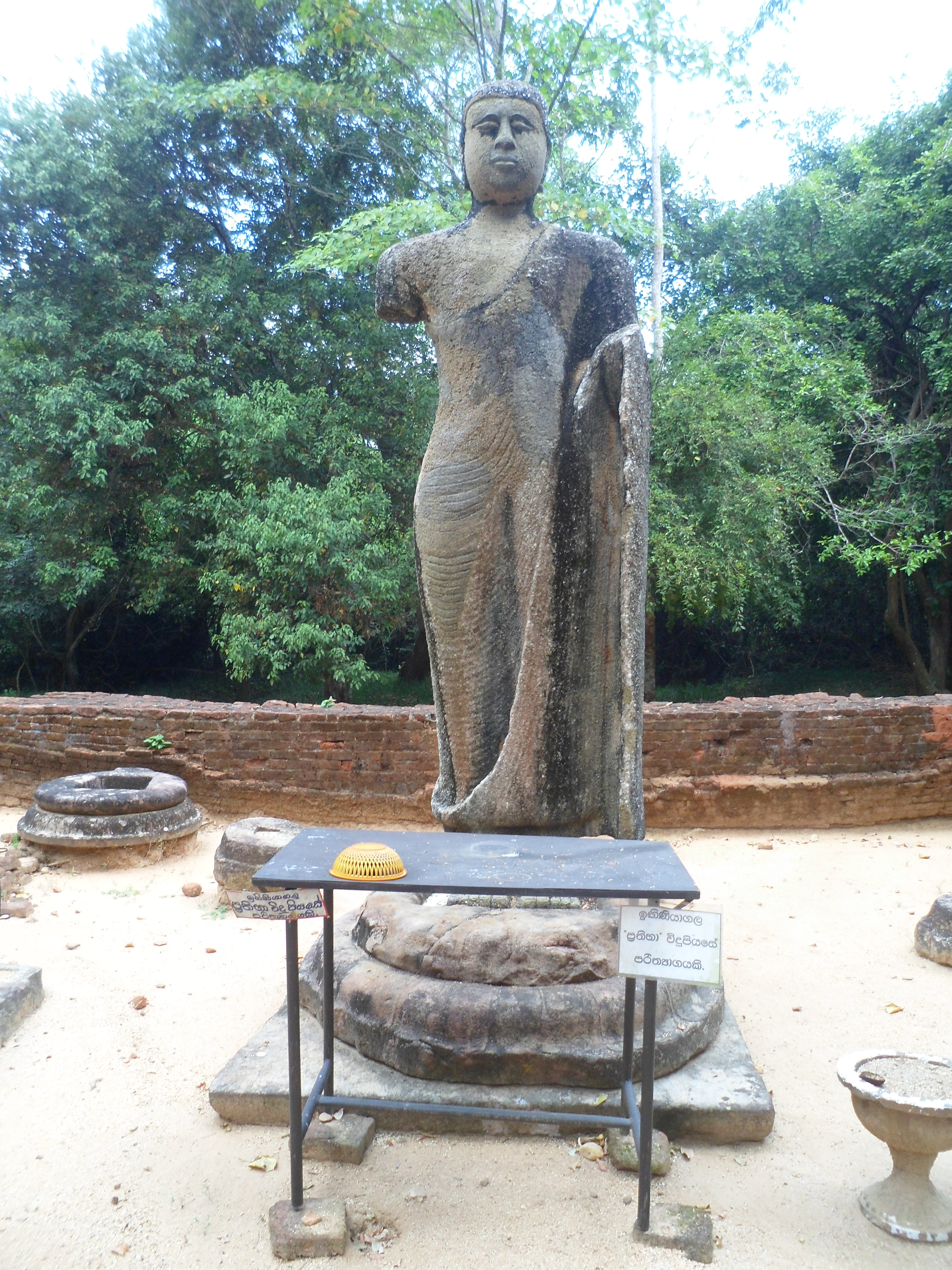
The granite Buddha statue

The history of Ovagiriya archaeological ruins dates back to the 5th century or before. It is believed this ancient monastery to be a creation of King Kavantissa, the ruler of Ruhuna. Although there is no archaeological evidence to corroborate this assumption.

With time this site was ruined and again it was explored and discovered by the Archaeology Department of Sri Lanka in 1956 at the request of the Gal Oya Development Board. At the time of discovery, most of the ruins had been destroyed by the operations of the Gal Oya Development scheme.

== Ruins ==
Among the ruins, a stupa, an image house with a Buddha statue, Guard stones, stone pillars, Balustrades (Korawak gal), and flat clay tiles used for roofing purposes, can be seen on this site. The stupa which belongs to the early Anuradhapura Period is built on an unusual octagonal platform instead of a normal circular or square-shaped platform. Which is one of the unique features of this temple.

In 2008 the Chemical Conservation Division of the Archaeology Department commenced restoration of the 3.5 m (11.5 ft) height handless granite Buddha statue in the image house. At the time of restoration, the shoulder portion of the statue was broken and fallen on the ground. Today the statue has been lifted and kept in the standing position.

These Ovagiriya ruins are scattered over an area of 2.8–3.2 ha (7–8 acres).

== See also ==
- List of Archaeological Protected Monuments in Sri Lanka
