= Addalachchenai Divisional Secretariat =

- Divisional Secretariat
- Interactive map of Addalachchenai Divisional Secretariat
- Coordinates: 7.27551°N 81.82047°E
- Country: Sri Lanka
- Province: Eastern Province
- District: Ampara District
- Time zone: UTC+5:30 (Sri Lanka Standard Time)

Addalachchenai Divisional Secretariat is a Divisional Secretariat of Ampara District, of Eastern Province, Sri Lanka.

== Demography-Religion ==
Religion in Addalachchenai DS Division (2012)
1. Buddhist (5.80%)
2. Hindu (1.70%)
3. Muslim (92.3%)
4. Roman Catholic (0.10%)
5. Other Christian (0.00%)
6. Other (0.00%)
