= Ampara Divisional Secretariat =

- Divisional Secretariat
- Country: Sri Lanka
- Province: Eastern Province
- District: Ampara District
- Time zone: UTC+5:30 (Sri Lanka Standard Time)

Ampara Divisional Secretariat is a Divisional Secretariat of Ampara District, of Eastern Province, Sri Lanka.

== Demography-Religion ==
Religion in Ampara DS Division (2012)
1. Buddhist (97.2%)
2. Hindu (0.30%)
3. Muslim (0.70%)
4. Roman Catholic (1.20%)
5. Other Christian (0.50%)
6. Other (0.00%)
