= Uththara Jayamaha Vihara =

Buddhist temple in Hingurana, Sri Lanka

- උත්තර ජයමහා විහාරය
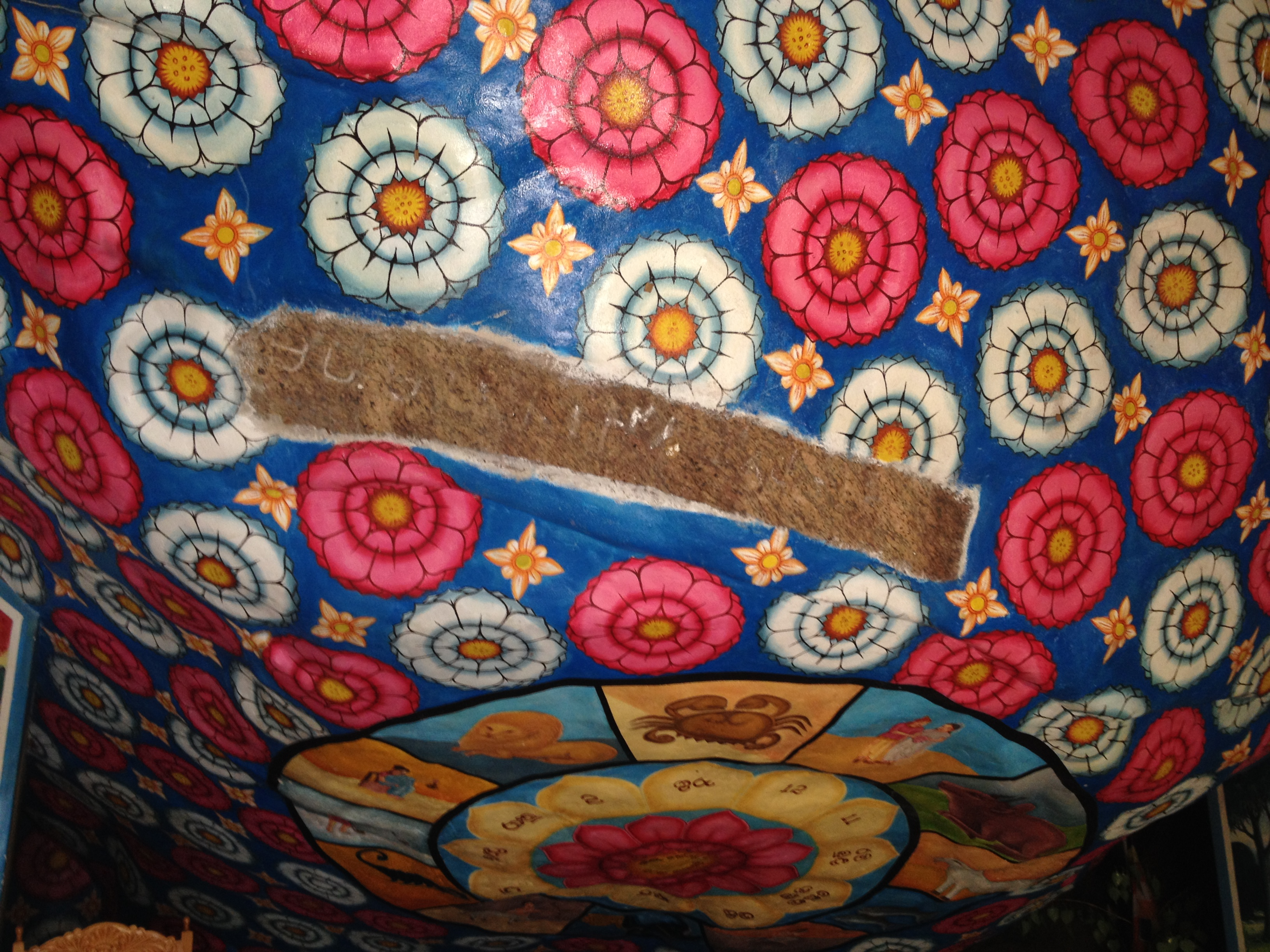
- The rock inscription inside the Image house of the Vihara

Religion
- Affiliation: Buddhism
- District: Ampara
- Province: Eastern Province

Location
- Location: Hingurana
- Country: Sri Lanka
- Interactive map of Uththara Jayamaha Vihara
- Coordinates: 07°13′17.8″N 81°40′45.7″E

Architecture
- Type: Buddhist Temple
- Archaeological Protected Monument of Sri Lanka
- Designated: Sri Lanka

Uththara Jayamaha Vihara (Sinhala: උත්තර ජයමහා විහාරය) is an ancient Buddhist temple in Hingurana, Sri Lanka. The temple has been formally recognised by the Government as an archaeological site in Sri Lanka. The designation was declared on 26 December 2014 under the government Gazette number 1895.

== The temple ==
The temple at Hingurana which lies behind the Gal Oya Plantations Sugar factory is located about 1 km (0.62 mi) distance from the Hingurana Roundabout. It is believed that the history of Uttara Jayamaha Vihara is dated back to the reign of King Saddha Tissa (137 BC – 119 BC). The modern temple complex stand today is said to be built upon the ancient temple belonging to the old Digamadulla Kingdom. Due to the recent modernisation works, the antiquity of the temple has been almost diminished. Among the ancient structures, stone Korawak Gala, rock inscriptions, drip ledged caves, parts of pillars and other artifacts can be identified.

== Inscriptions ==
An early Brahmi inscription belonging to the pre-Christian era has been identified on the rock ceiling of the temple image house. The inscription was copied in 1971 by the Department of Archaeology.

Period: 2nd century BC, Script: Early Brahmi, Language: Old Sinhalese
Text: "Mahamata-Utara-jhita-Racitaya lene"
Translation: "The cave of Racita, the daughter of the great minister Uttara"
