= Niyuguna Raja Maha Vihara =

Buddhist temple in Niyuguna, Sri Lanka

- නියුගුණ රජ මහා විහාරය

Religion
- Affiliation: Buddhism
- District: Ampara
- Province: Eastern Province

Location
- Location: Niyuguna Kanda, Eragama
- Country: Sri Lanka
- Interactive map of Niyuguna Raja Maha Vihara
- Coordinates: 07°13′49.0″N 81°42′08.9″E

Architecture
- Type: Buddhist Temple
- Archaeological Protected Monument of Sri Lanka
- Designated: 26 December 2014

Niyuguna Raja Maha Vihara is an ancient Buddhist temple in Niyuguna, Sri Lanka. It is located on the wayside of Hingurana – Eragama road approximately 4 km (2.5 mi) from Hingurana. Presently, the temple has been formally recognised by the Government as an archaeological site in Sri Lanka through a Gazette notification published on 26 December 2014.

The temple complex was constructed on a rocky outcrop called Niyuguna Kanda. A large number of ancient monuments such as mounds of Stupas, rock inscriptions, ruined building structures, flight of steps, drip ledged caves, and Siripathul gal have been identified in the temple premises. The Brahmi inscriptions discovered from the site indicate that the temple has a history running back to the pre-Christian era.
