= Peace Pagoda, Ampara =

Peace Pagoda
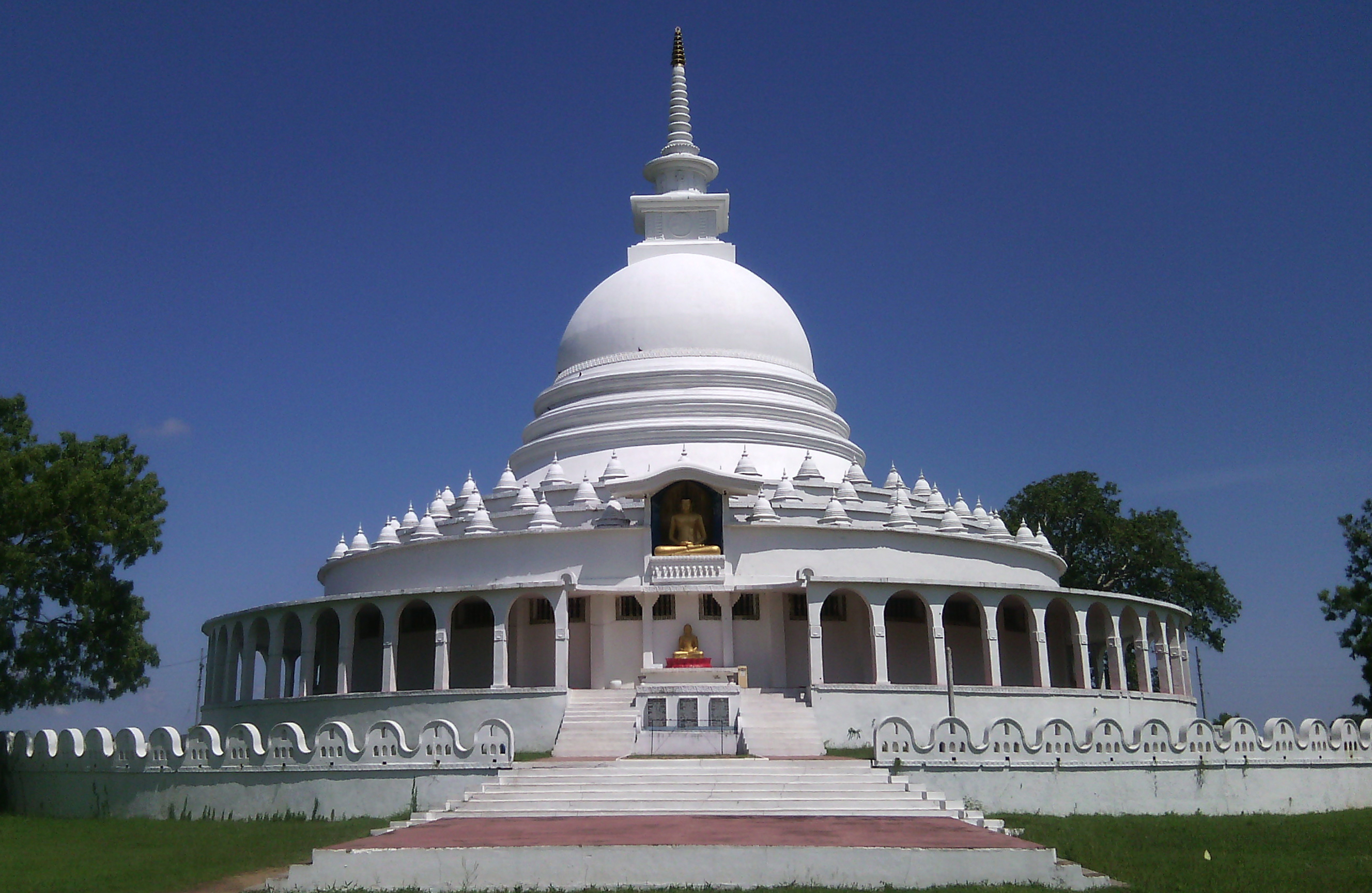

Religion
- Affiliation: Buddhism

Location
- Country: Sri Lanka
- Interactive map of Peace Pagoda
- Coordinates: 7.2852855°N 81.6539499°E

Architecture
- Founder: Nichidatsu Fujii
- Completed: 1988

Ampara Peace Pagoda (Sinhala: අම්පාර සාම චෛත්‍යය) (also known as Ampara Sama Ceitya) is one of a number of Peace Pagodas in the world, built since World War II and designed to promote the non-violence in the community and unite them in their search for world peace. It is located in Ampara, a small town located in the Eastern Province of Sri Lanka and is one of the Ampara's most prominent landmarks.

There are another four Peace Pagodas constructed in various places around Sri Lanka. They are located at Unawatuna, Adam's Peak, Bandarawela and Walapane.

== History ==
The Ampara Peace Pagoda was constructed by Nipponzan monks under the patronage of Nichidatsu Fujii maha thero (1885–1985) of Nipponzan-Myōhōji of Japan with the objective of commemorating his 99th birth day. The Pagoda was declared open by Junius Richard Jayewardene, President of Sri Lanka on 28 February 1988.

== Temple ==
The Peace pagoda temple is situated 4 km far away from the ampara DS Senanayake Rd from the clock tower, which heads towards Inginyagala.

The temple consists of a Pagoda, a Mahayana style Vihara geya (Image house) and a small Bodhi tree. The pagoda is retinue with 99 small pagodas and there is a straight path from the entrance to the pagoda.

== Gallery ==
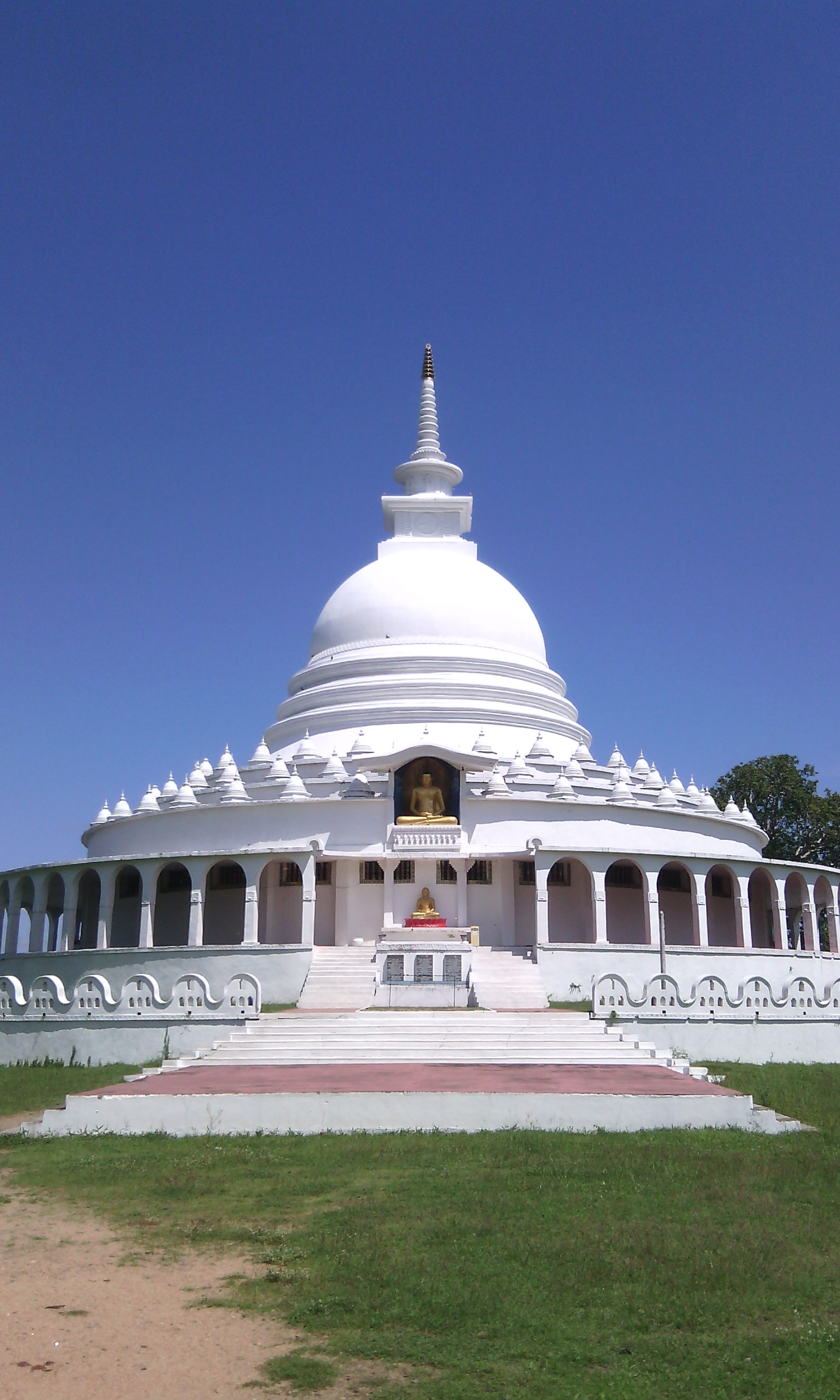
The stupa.

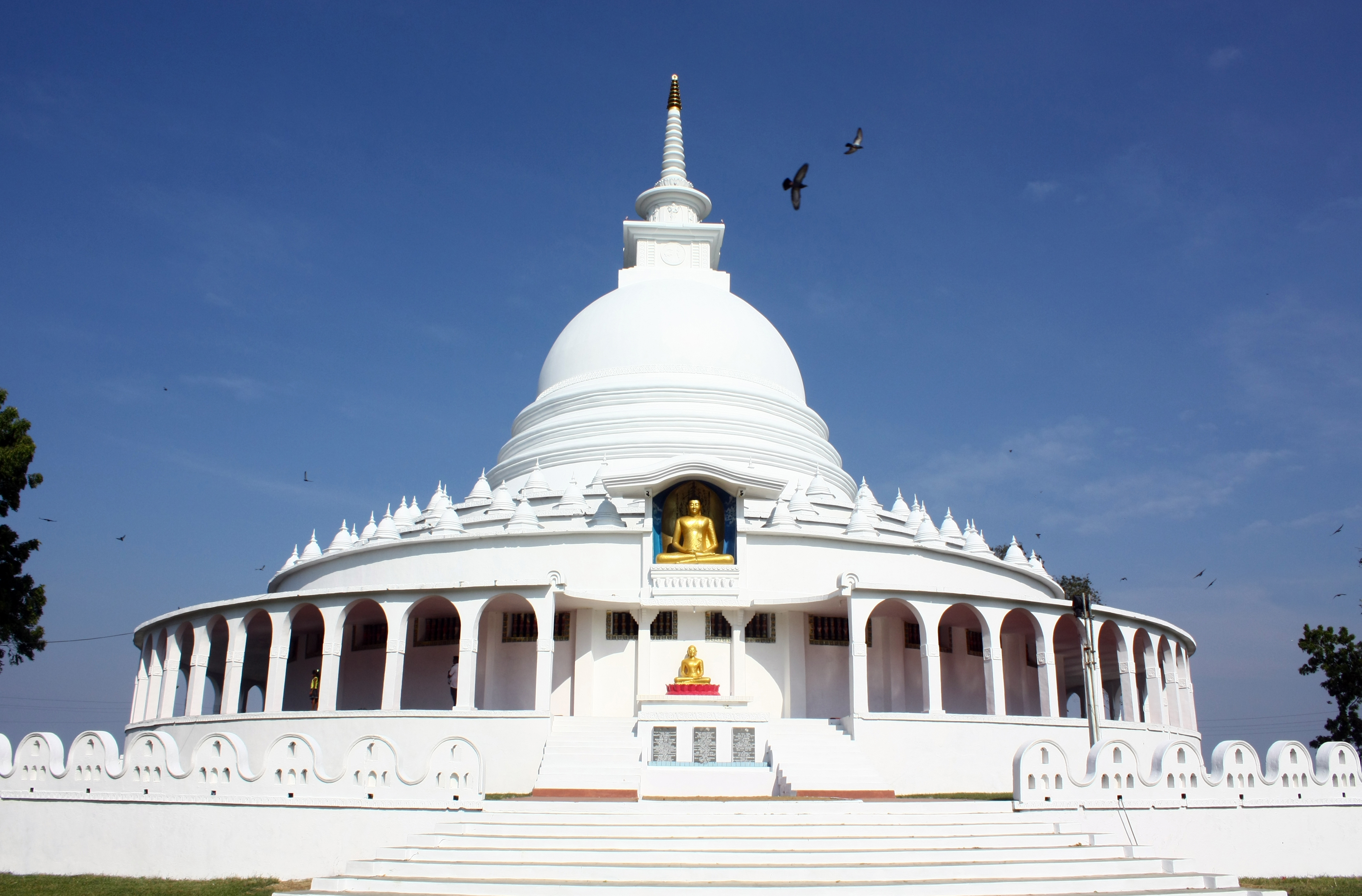
A closeup photo on the stupa.

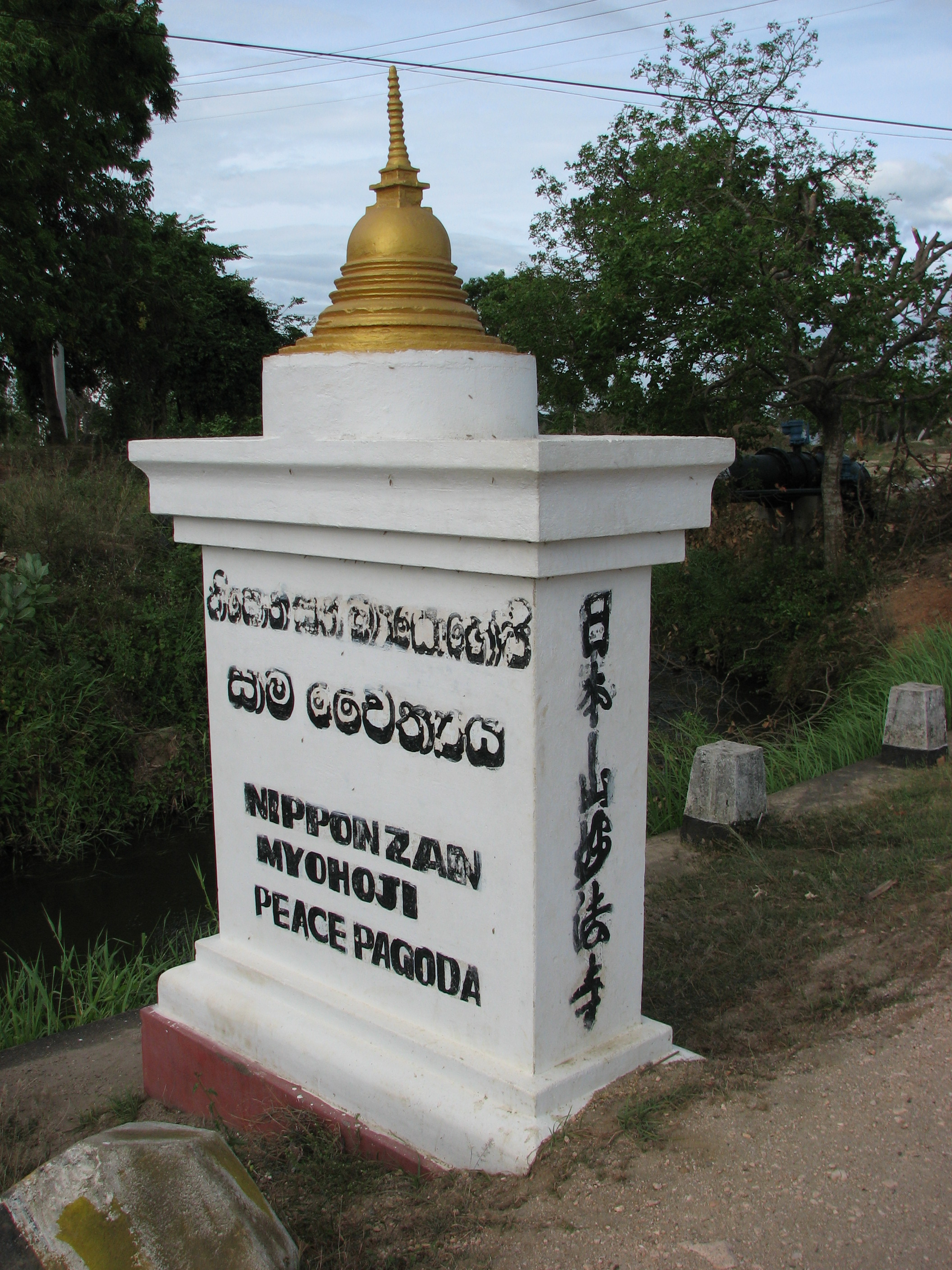
The Signpost at the entrance.
