= Lahugala =

Lahugala ලාහුගල லகுகலை
- Town
- Location within Sri Lanka
- Coordinates: 6°52′41.3″N 81°43′12.1″E
- Country: Sri Lanka
- District: Ampara District
- Time zone: UTC+5:30 (SLST)
- Postal code: 32512

Lahugala (Sinhala: ලාහුගල, Tamil: லகுகலை) is a small town in Ampara District, Eastern Province of Sri Lanka. The town is located on Colombo-Batticaloa main road approximately 14 km (8.7 mi) away from Pothuvil town.

Religion in Lahugala DS Division
1. Buddhist (93.0%)
2. Muslim (0.03%)
3. Hindu (6.35%)
4. Roman Catholic (0.27%)
5. Other Christian (0.30%)
6. Other (0.01%)

== History ==
Lahugala area was an ancient populated place in Sri Lanka since Anuradhapura era and was a part of the Kingdom of Ruhuna. A number of ancient ruined sites located in and around the area prove the long history of Lahugala. Most of these sites found in the area is said to be belonged to the royal family of King Mahanaga.

== Education ==
The government owned schools in Lahugala division are listed below.

- Panama Maha Vidyalaya.
- Lahugala Maha Vidyalaya.
- Hulannuge Vidyalaya.
- Paranagovipola Vidyalaya.
- Government Tamil mixed school.
- viharamahadevi vidyalaya

== Tourist attractions ==
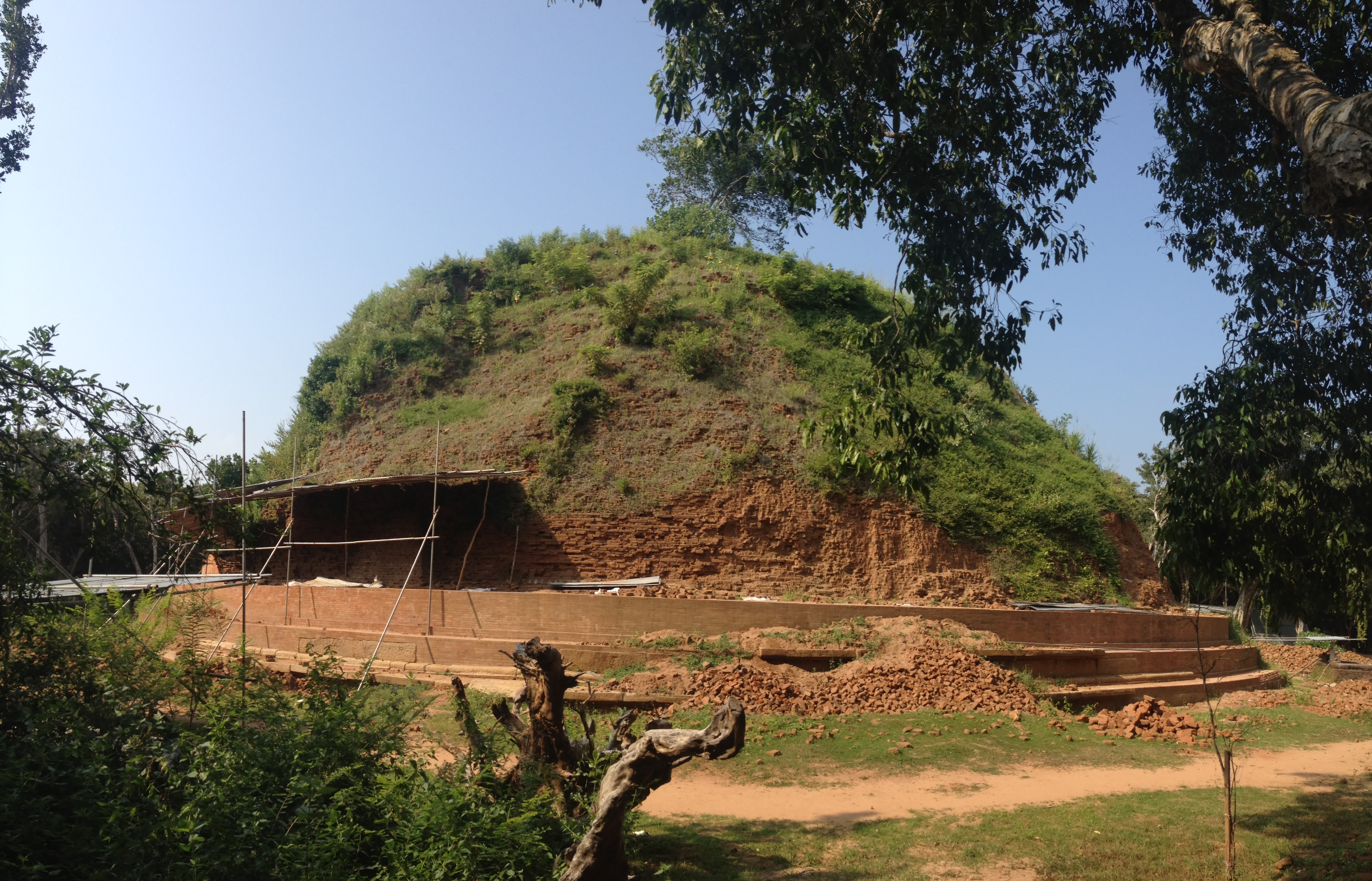
Lahugala Neelagiriseya is the largest Buddhist Stupa in Eastern Province.

- Lahugala Kitulana National Park, was declared a national park on 1 October 1980 and is one of the smallest national parks in Sri Lanka. Despite its land area, the park is considered as an important habitat for Sri Lankan elephants.
- Magul Maha Vihara, is an archaeologically protected Buddhist temple in Lahugala, built by King Kavanthissa in the 2nd Century BC. The temple lies on the northern edge of the Lahugala National Park. The famed moonstone with a mahout on the elephant can be seen in the temple.
- Neelagiriseya, is an ancient Buddhist Stupa which is believed to have been built by either King Kawantissa (3rd Century BC) or King Bhatikabaya (20 BC-9 AC).
- Lahugala Kota Vehera, is one of four ancient Stupas belonging to the Kota Vehera style in the country.
- Lahugala Kiri Vehera, is an old Vihara, located in Lahugala. Currently this temple has been protected as one of archaeological protected sites in Sri Lanka.
