= Padiyathalawa Divisional Secretariat =

- Divisional Secretariat
- Country: Sri Lanka
- Province: Eastern Province
- District: Ampara District

Area
  - Total: 379 km^{2} (146 sq mi)

Population
  - Total: 18,209
- Time zone: UTC+5:30 (Sri Lanka Standard Time)

Padiyathalawa Divisional Secretariat is a Divisional Secretariat of Ampara District, of Eastern Province, Sri Lanka.

Located in the DS division of Padiyathalawa is the town of Padiyathalawa.

== Demography-Religion ==
Religion in Padiyathalawa DS Division (2012)
1. Buddhist (99.2%)
2. Hindu (0.10%)
3. Muslim (0.50%)
4. Roman Catholic (0.10%)
5. Other Christian (0.10%)
6. Other (0.00%)

The DS division of Padiyathalawa is further divided into 20 GN divisions:

- Dorakumbura
- Galode
- Hagamwela
- Holike
- Kehelulla
- Kirawana
- Kolamanthalawa
- Komana
- Marangala
- Miriswatta
- Moradeniya
- Padiyathalawa
- Palathuruwella
- Pallegama
- Pulungasmulla
- Saranagama
- Serankada
- Thalapitaoya Left
- Thalapitaoya South
- Unapana
