= Damana Divisional Secretariat =

- Divisional Secretariat
- Interactive map of Damana Divisional Secretariat
- Country: Sri Lanka
- Province: Eastern Province
- District: Ampara District
- Time zone: UTC+5:30 (Sri Lanka Standard Time)

Damana Divisional Secretariat is a Divisional Secretariat of Ampara District, of Eastern Province, Sri Lanka.

== Demography-Religion ==
Religion in Damana DS Division (2012)
1. Buddhist (99.0%)
2. Hindu (0.10%)
3. Muslim (0.40%)
4. Roman Catholic (0.30%)
5. Other Christian (0.20%)
6. Other (0.00%)
