= Mahaoya Divisional Secretariat =

Coordinates: 7.5762°N 81.3524°E

- Divisional Secretariat
- Interactive map of Mahaoya Divisional Secretariat
- Country: Sri Lanka
- Province: Eastern Province
- District: Ampara District
- Time zone: UTC+5:30 (Sri Lanka Standard Time)
- Postal code: 32070

Mahaoya Divisional Secretariat is a Divisional Secretariat of Ampara District, of Eastern Province, Sri Lanka.

== Demography-Religion ==
Religion in Mahaoya DS Division (2012)
1. Buddhist (99.3%)
2. Hindu (0.10%)
3. Muslim (0.20%)
4. Roman Catholic (0.10%)
5. Other Christian (0.20%)
6. Other (0.00%)
