= Pothuvil Divisional Secretariat =

- Divisional Secretariat
- Interactive map of Pothuvil Divisional Secretariat
- Country: Sri Lanka
- Province: Eastern Province
- District: Ampara District
- Time zone: UTC+5:30 (Sri Lanka Standard Time)

Pothuvil Divisional Secretariat is a Divisional Secretariat of Ampara District, of Eastern Province, Sri Lanka.

Religion in Pothuvil DS Division (2012)
1. Buddhist (2.60%)
2. Hindu (15.5%)
3. Muslim (78.2%)
4. Roman Catholic (0.70%)
5. Other Christian (3.00%)
6. Other (0.00%)
