= Lahugala Divisional Secretariat =

- Divisional Secretariat
- Interactive map of Lahugala Divisional Secretariat
- Country: Sri Lanka
- Province: Eastern Province
- District: Ampara District
- Time zone: UTC+5:30 (Sri Lanka Standard Time)

Lahugala Divisional Secretariat is a Divisional Secretariat of Ampara District, of Eastern Province, Sri Lanka.

== Demography-Religion ==
Religion in Lahugala DS Division (2012)
1. Buddhist (93.0%)
2. Hindu (6.40%)
3. Muslim (0.00%)
4. Roman Catholic (0.30%)
5. Other Christian (0.30%)
6. Other (0.00%)
