= Batticaloa region =

Ancient region of Tamil settlements

Batticaloa region மட்டக்களப்புத் தேசம்
- Territory of Colonial Ceylon
- ????–1961
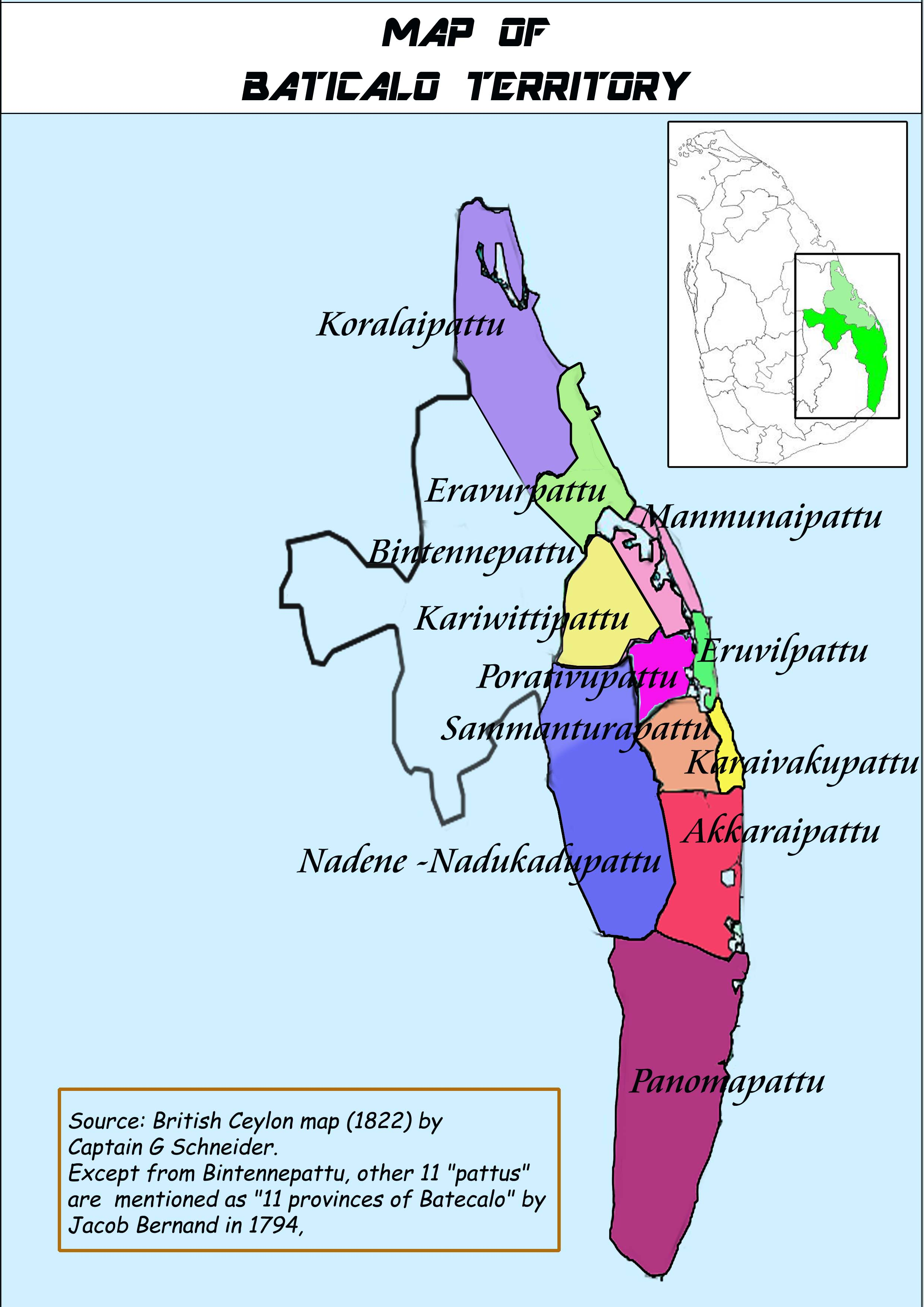
- The map of former Batticaloa District based on a British Ceylon map of 1822 CE
- Capital: Sammanthurai till 1628, Puliyanthivu 1628–1961
- Population
  - 1881: 105,558
  - 1953: 270,043
- History
  - Tribal Native and settlements from Tamilakam: ????
  - Bifurcated into two districts of Batticaloa District and Ampara District: 1961
Preceded by	Succeeded by
Dominion of Ceylon	Batticaloa district; Ampara District

Batticaloa region (Tamil: மட்டக்களப்புத் தேசம் Maṭṭakkaḷapput tēcam; also known as Matecalo; Baticalo;) in colonial records was the ancient region of Tamil settlements in Sri Lanka. The foremost record of this region can be seen in Portuguese and Dutch historical documents along with local inscriptions such as Sammanthurai Copper epigraphs written in 1683 CE which also mentions Mattakkalappu Desam. Although the region was bifuricated into districts of Batticaloa and Ampara Districts, the amended term "Batti-Ampara Districts" as well as “Keezhakarai” can still be seen in the Tamil print media of Sri Lanka.

== History ==
The Ancient Batticaloa region spread south to Verugal Aru and north to Kumbukkan Oya, and some researchers lengthen it from Koneswaram to the north and Katirkamam to the south. Brahmi Inscriptions and ruins related to Megalithic period observed in Kathiraveli, Vellaveli, Ukanthai and Kudumbigala pointed out the antiquity of the Batticaloa region. Mattakalappu Purva Charithiram, the chronicle of Eastern Tamils, which was collected from palm manuscripts dated back to the 17th century CE, annotates the history of the kings who ruled this region with some historical background that is still in question. It narrates that this region was an ancient settlement of aborigines including Nagar, Thumilar or Iyakkar, and Vedar. Etymological research on some places such as Nagamunai, and Mantunagan Saalai (present Mandur) indicated their association with Naga tribe of ancient Sri Lanka.

Mattakalappu Purva Charithiram also includes the settlements that arrived in this territory from various parts of present India in different time periods. The arrival of Virasaivite Priests for Nagarmunai Subramanya Swami Kovil from Srisailam of Andhra is believed to be a contemporary example of the Vira Saivite renaissance that occurred during the 12th century CE.

== Capital ==
It is said that Sammanthurai, a town in the present-day Ampara district, was the primary capital of the Batticaloa region until the colonial period. The Portuguese built a fort in 1628 against the union of the Kandy kings and Dutch merchants at Puliyanthivu, where present-day Batticaloa is situated. However, the Portuguese were defeated in the war with the alliance of Kandyan and the Dutch East India Company in 1638, and the fort was captured by the Dutch. Puliyanthivu became the administrative capital of the district until the independence of the island in 1948.

== Administration ==
During the colonial period, the Batticaloa region followed Vannimai chieftainship, the same as in the Vanni region of northern Ceylon. There were three or four Vannian chieftainships as observed by Portuguese historians like Bocarro and Queroz – Palugāmam, Panova, and Sammanturai, along with Eravur. By the end of the eighteenth century, the Dutch colonial territories comprised eleven separate sub-chieftaincies, or as Dutch called them, provinces as well as seven Mukkuvar controlled districts of Eravur, Manmunai, Eruvil, Poraitivu, Karaivaku, Sammanturai and Akkaraipattu, plus Panama in the south, Nadu Kadu (or Nadene) in the west, and Koralai and Kariwitti to the north. A total of eleven provinces were in the Batticaloa territory. Nadukadupattu, the last pattu inhabited by the people who came from Sitawaka in the 17th century, was abandoned by its inhabitants at the end of the 19th century and its residual populated area was later identified as "Wewgampattu". In the 1950s, there were nine D.R.O divisions (Divisional Revenue Officer Divisions – present Divisional secretariat Divisions) in Batticaloa District: Panamapattu, Akkaraipattu, Nintavur-Karaivakupattu, Sammanthuraipattu, Manmunaipattu North, Porativu – Manmunai South – Eruvilpattu, Bintennapattu, Eravur-Koralaipattu, and Wewgampattu.

== Bifurcation of the ancient territory ==
After independence, the Gal Oya scheme was proposed by the Dominion of Ceylon to increase the rice productivity of the southeastern part of the country in 1949, which caused the creation of many settlements in the Nadukadupattu region within the end of that scheme in 1953. According to the new proposal of electoral reforms in Ceylon in 1959, Nadukadu – Nadene pattus were introduced as a new electoral district with the name Digamadulla on 19 March 1960. At the end of 1960, Batticaloa District consisted of four electoral districts in its southernmost part – Pottuvil, Kalmunai, Nintavur, and Ampara.

Subsequently, the government declared a new administrative district including Pottuvil, Kalmunai, and Ampara electoral districts on 10 April 1961. Ancient Batticaloa region was thereby divided into two administrative districts where the northern part remained under the same name, and the southern part got a new name, "Amparai". According to the 1978 Constitution of Sri Lanka, the four single-member electoral districts of Ampara were replaced with one multi-member Digamadulla electoral district.

Pattu divisions of the newly formed Batticaloa district kept their old names, though they disrupted to following divisions in modern Ampara District.

- Akkaraipattu – Divided into four divisions today; Akkaraipattu, Addalaichenai, Alayadivembu and Thirukkovil.
- Panamaipattu – Lahugala and Pottuvil divisions.
- Karaivakupattu – Navitanveli, Karaitivu, Kalmunai Tamil, Kalmunai Muslim and Sainthamaruthu
- Sammanturaipattu – Sammanthurai, Irakkamam and Nintavur
- Nadene -Nadukadupattu / Wewagampattu – Ampara, Damana and Uhana
- Bintennapattu – Pathiyathalawa(Bintenna West) and Maha-Oya (Bintenna East)
