= Thambiluvil Inscription =

16th century Tamil inscription

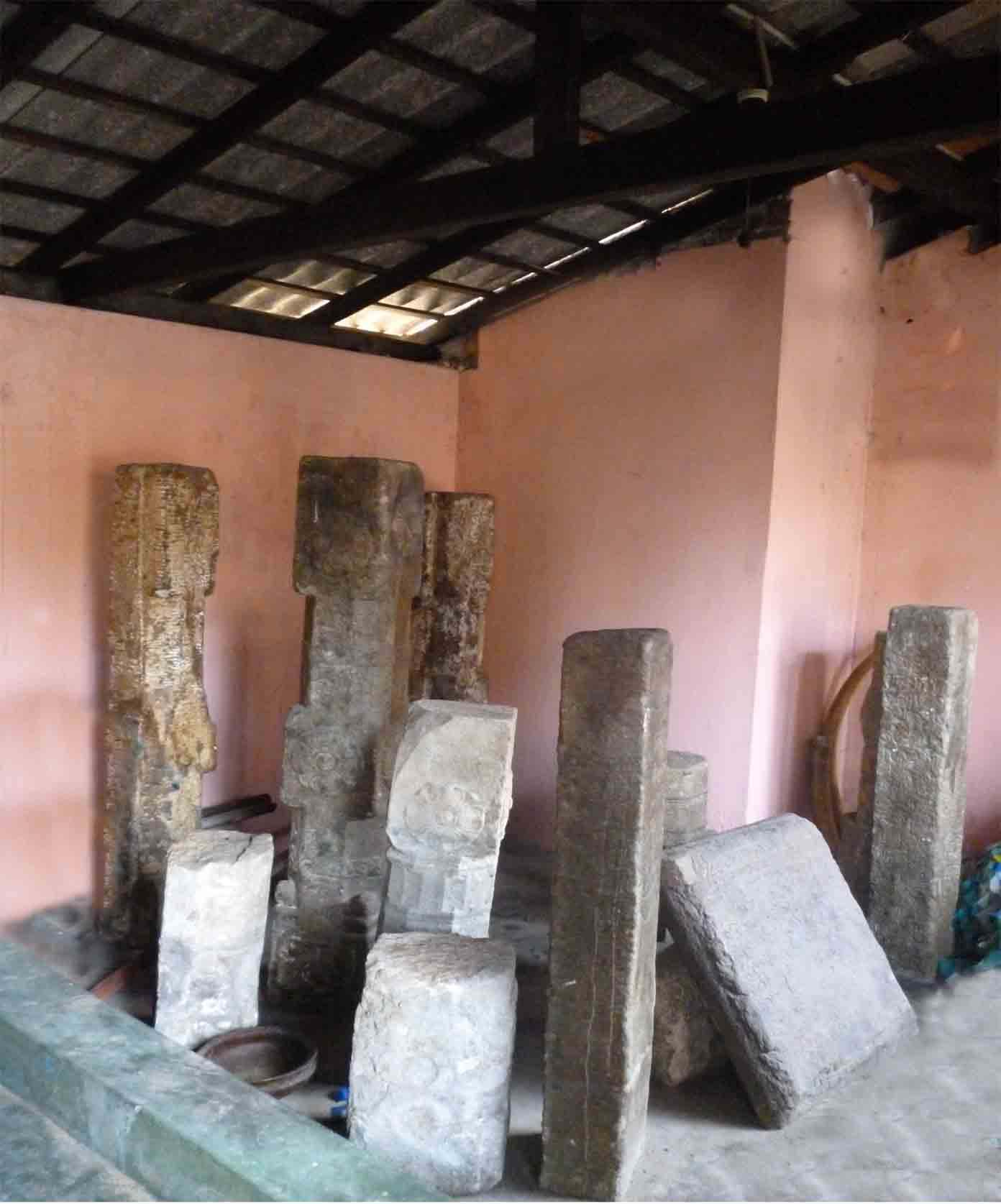
Thambiluvil Inscription along with other inscriptions kept now in Thirukkovil Temple

Thambiluvil Inscription is a Tamil inscription dated to 16th Century CE initially found at Thambiluvil village in Ampara District, Sri Lanka. This inscription was donated by Vijayabahu VII of Kotte mentioning about his donation of "Vōvil" or "Wowil" to a temple.

== Hugh Nevill ==
This inscription was observed by Hugh Nevill, a British Ceylon civil servant at Thambiluvil Sri Kannaki amman temple in the 1800s. The mount of lord Murugan - "peacock" engraved in that inscription let him to assume that it was belong to the nearest Thirukkovil Murugan Temple and he brought it there. Thambiluvil Inscription still can be seen in the small "Museum" in that temple.

== Epigraphy ==
The cuboid shaped inscription which is nearly 1.5 m in height, is engraved with a peacock and a pair of Trident and Spear, the holy weapons of Hindu gods, Shiva and Murugan in its two sides. Its other two sides contain the old Tamil scripts which state the purpose of the inscription.

ஸ்ரீ சங்கபோதி பருமரான திறிபுவனச் சக்கரவர்த்திகள் ஸ்ரீ விசயபாகு தேவற்கு ஆண்டு பத்தாவதில் தை மாதம் 20 தியதி, சிவஞான சங்கரர் கோவிலுக்குக் கொடுத்த வோவில். இந்த தன்மத்துக்கு அகித்தம் செய்தானாகில் கெங்கைக் கரையில் காராம்பசுவைக் கொன்ற பாவத்தை அடையக் கடவராகவும்
Srī caṅkapōti parumarāṉa tiṟipuvaṉac cakkaravarttikaḷ srī vicayapāku tēvaṟku āṇṭu pattāvatil tai mātam 20 tiyati, civañāṉa caṅkarar kōvilukkuk koṭutta vōvil. Inta taṉmattukku akittam ceytāṉākil keṅkaik karaiyil kārāmpacuvaik koṉṟa pāvattai aṭaiyak kaṭavarākavum
Protector of Sri Sangabodhi, The Lord of three worlds, His holiness "Sri Vijayabahu Devar" gave vōvil to "Sivanjana Sangarar Temple" on 20th of "Thai month" of 10th year of his reign. If anyone violate this Dharma, they will suffer with the sin of killing a cow in the bank of river Ganges.

== Donor ==
Most of researchers conclude that the king mentioned in this inscription is Vijayabahu VII of Kotte who ruled the country from 1509 to 1521 CE. However, it is not confirmed yet whether there was a Siva temple named "Siva njana Sangarar" was situated in the present Kannaki Amman Temple premises whereas the inscription was initially found.

Dutch maps of Ceylon indicate that there was a vast water resource named "Wowil" or "Bouwille" in Tamblowielle region of Batecalo. Mattakkalappu Purva Carithram, an ancient chronicle of Eastern Sri Lanka, also mention about a lagoon near Sankamankandy made by a Feudatory king named "Manuneya Gajabahu". A large brackish lake known as "Thandiyadi Lake" nowadays south to Thambiluvil is identified as this "Wowil".

It is still unclear that why did the king donated this lake to a temple again. Someone in this area may forcibly caught the paddy fields and the lake of "Vovil" from public usage which may be recaptured by the king and donated to temple.

== See also ==
- Thambiluvil
- Batticaloa Territory
- Tamil copper-plate inscriptions
