= Thirukkovil Temple =

- திருக்கோவில் Thirukkovil Arulmigu Citra Velayudha Swami Aalayam
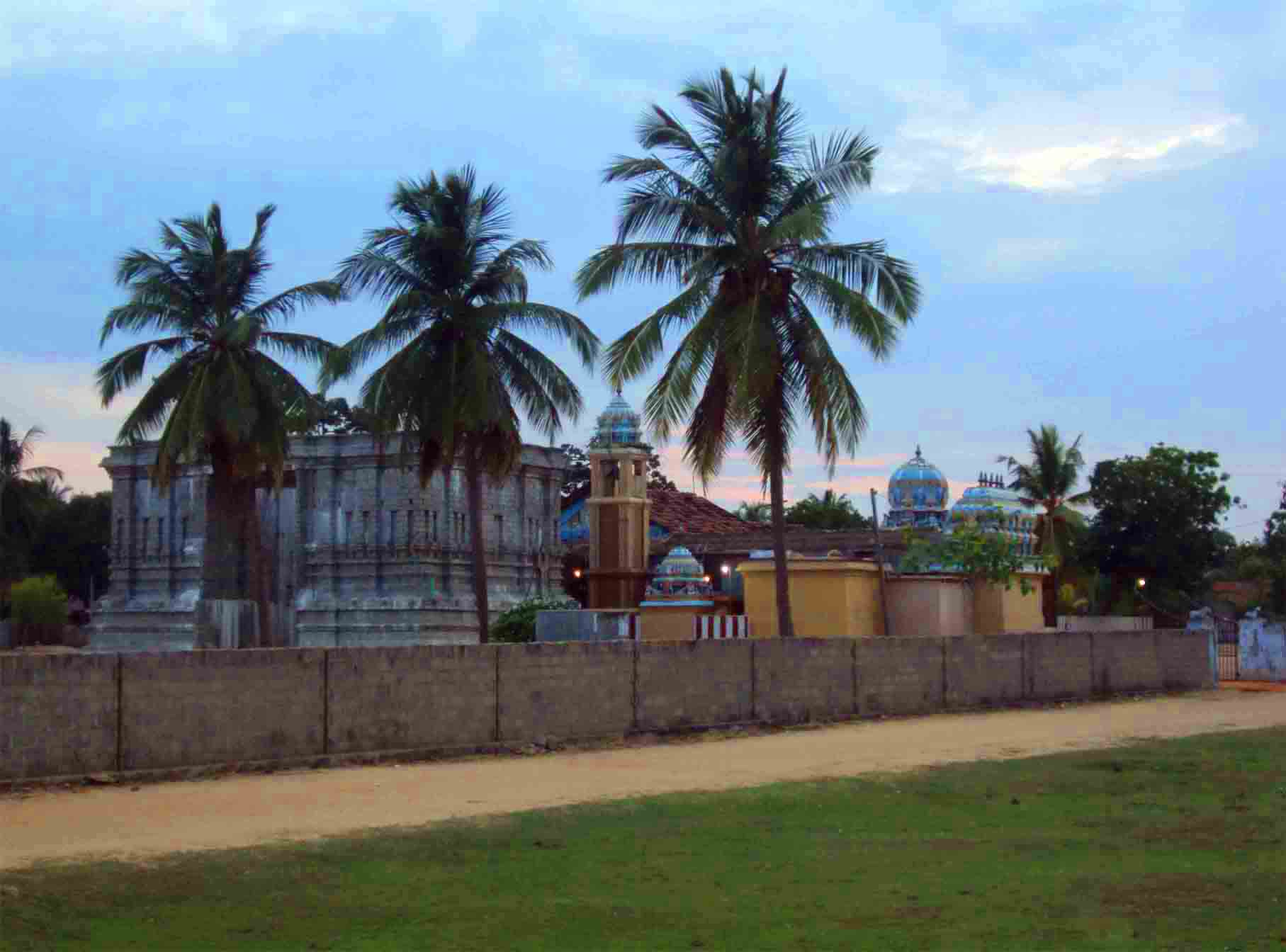
- Front view of temple

- Location in Sri Lanka

Religion
- Affiliation: Hinduism
- District: Ampara
- Province: Eastern
- Deity: Sithiravelayuthar (his Vel)
- Festivals: Utsava and Śrāddha centered on Aadi Amavasai

Location
- Country: Sri Lanka
- Coordinates: 7°7′6″N 81°51′22″E

Architecture
- Type: Tamil architecture
- Inscriptions: Thambiluvil Inscription

Thirukkovil Temple (officially Thirukkovil Citra Velayudha Swami Kovil, Tamil: திருக்கோவில் சித்திரவேலாயுத சுவாமி ஆலயம்) is the most significant Hindu temple in Thirukkovil, Ampara District of Eastern Province, Sri Lanka. It is dedicated to Chitravelayudhar (Cittiravēlāyutar, literally "One with elegant spear") who was once the guardian deity of Mattakkalappu Desam (Batti - Ampara districts nowadays) and this temple enjoyed the honor of Desathukkovil (Tēcattukkōvil, royal temple) of the Batticaloa region. Archaeological and historical evidences suggest that Cholan, Kotte and Kandyan kings maintained strong relations with this temple in the past.

== Etymology ==
Kovil is the Tamil equivalent of shrine or temple. All Hindu temples in Tamil Speaking region are generally known as Thirukkovils adding the prefix 'Thiru' which means great or sacred. The inhabitants of Eastern Sri Lanka praise that it is unusual to apply the sacred term "Thirukkovil" to not only a specific temple but to its whereabout too. "Mattakkalappu Purva charithiram", the 18th century CE Tamil chronicle of Eastern Sri Lanka, narrates that Nagarmunai Subramanya Kovil was the first temple initially constructed in agamic tradition at Batticaloa region and it was subsequently known as "Thirukkovil" (prominent temple).

The old name Nagarmunai is interpreted as it was one of the ancient settlements of Naga tribe of ancient Sri Lanka. Another name indicating Thirukkovil, Kaṇṭapāṇantuṟai, is also mentioned in Purva Charithiram manuscript.

== Legends ==
Kalinga King Bhuvaneka Gajabahu and his wife Cholan princess Thambathi Nallaal visited Batticaloa region during their way to Katirkamam. Prasannajith, the kinglet of Batticaloa welcomed the royal couple and requested them to repair the chief temple of his country, Nagarmunai Subrahmanya Swami Kovil. Bhuvaneka Gajabahu sought the assistance of his father in law Thirucholan and constructed Nagarmunai Kovil with the chola immigrants sent by the same. He consecrated the temple and renamed Thiukkovil since it was the first temple erected in agamic tradition in Batticaloa region. Prasannajith gifted his southern territory to Bhuvaneka Gajabahu as a reward for this marvelous construction. Gajabahu and his queen Thambathi Nallaal established a new kingdom known as 'Unnaasagiri' there. After a few years, their son Megavarnan, whose royal title was Manuneya Gajabahu reconstructed the temple in stone.

There were many ladies and Devadasis providing their services in Thirukkovil. Thangammai was one among them and she was the aalaathipendu (lady doing aarti) of Thirukkovil. During her later life, She couldn't be at the temple on time for the service and temple administrators terminated her service as she was 80 years old then. She couldn't bear that pain of leaving lord Citravelyudhan and cried and yelled all the night in the temple. Next day morning no one could find Thangammai in the temple premises but miraculously there was an eight-year-old girl getting ready for aarti. Devotees and administrators surprised when she revealed herself she was none other than Thangammai.

== History ==
Though the origin of the Thirukkovil temple is uncertain, it is assumed that the temple was initially a small thatched hut worshipped by Vedda and Naga tribes of this region. It was later expanded and built according to agamic tradition during the Chola rule in Sri Lanka (993-1070 CE). The deity here was venerated as the guardian deity of the Batticaloa region, ruled by Vannimai chieftains, feudatory under the Kandyan Kings. The stone inscriptions such as Thambiluvil Inscription confirm that once this deity was revered by the kings such as Vijayabahu VII of Kotte and Rajasinha II of Kandy. This temple has been substantially mentioned as Thirukkovil Pagoda in the Dutch maps of Ceylon starting from 16th century CE.

The temple was looted and destructed by Portuguese in the 1620s and it could only resurrect after two centuries. However, the rituals and its state importance through Batticaloa region were continued in its grievous period also. Thomas Christie, an Inspector of Hospitals of British Ceylon describes the antiquity of Sanctum, the sculptures and chariot belonged to Thirukkovil during his journey to Tangalle from Trincomalee in 1802.

== Thesaththukkovil ==
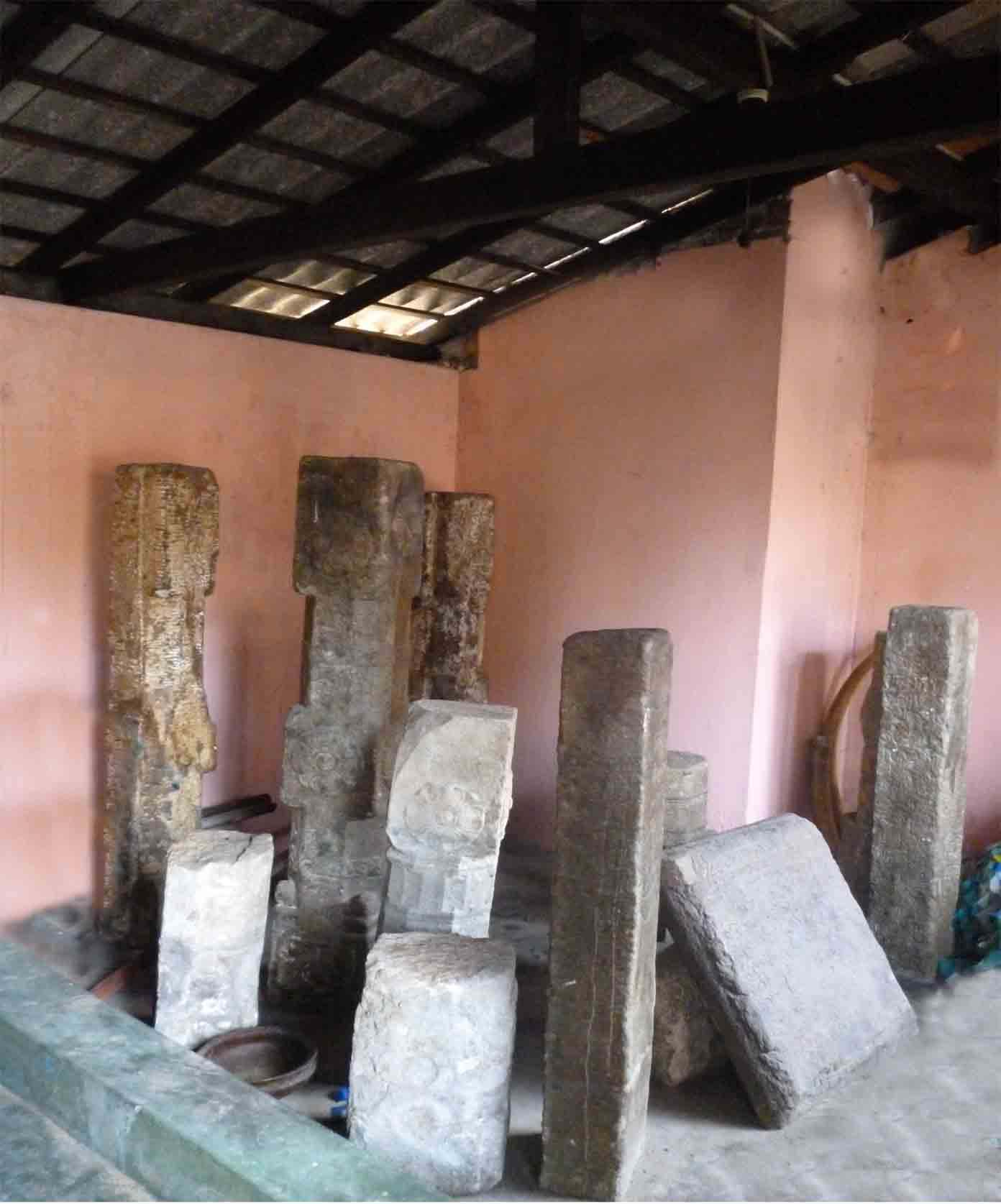
Inscriptions and Sandstone pillars preserved at Thirukkovil temple.

Thirukkovil is usually referred as thesaththukkovil as well as thiruppadaikkovil. Thiruppadai Kovil (திருப்படைக் கோவில் Tiruppaṭaik kōvil Literally "Holy Temple of Soldiers' Camp or weapons") is the term referred to seven popular temples in Batticaloa region - Kokkadichcholai, Sithandy, Thirukkovil, Mandur, Kovil Porativu, Verugal and Ukanthai. They are believed to be revered by the Chieftains ruled the country. Some historians consider the term "paṭai" in Thiruppataik kovil refers to weapon of Murugan - Vel, and ignores Kokkadichcholai from Thiruppataik Kovil list as it is a Sivan temple.

Old Batticaloa District was divided into 8 "pattu"s (Administrative divisions) - Akkaraipattu, Karaivakupattu, Eruvilpattu, Manmunaippattu, Sammanthuraipattu, Porativupattu, Eravurpattu, Kiriwittipattu along with three other adjacent pattus - Koralaipattu, Panamaipattu and Nadukadupattu. Ritual rights in Thirukkovil Annual Festivals were shared with whole inhabitants of 7 main pattus and Panamaipattu of Batticaloa region. According to Temple records, it can be confirmed that this custom was continued until the 1950s.

The structure of Sanctum is identified with Pandyan architecture. Inscriptions and Segments of broken sandstone pillars can be observed in the courtyard around the temple. Two main inscriptions are preserved in a small room south to temple entrance. One of them - Thambiluvil Inscription found in Thambiluvil Sri Kannaki amman temple tells about the donation of "Vovil" (probably an irrigation water source) by King Vijayabahu VII of Kotte kingdom (1507–1521) while the purpose of another inscription is unclear which is also donated by the same king.

== Annual Festival ==
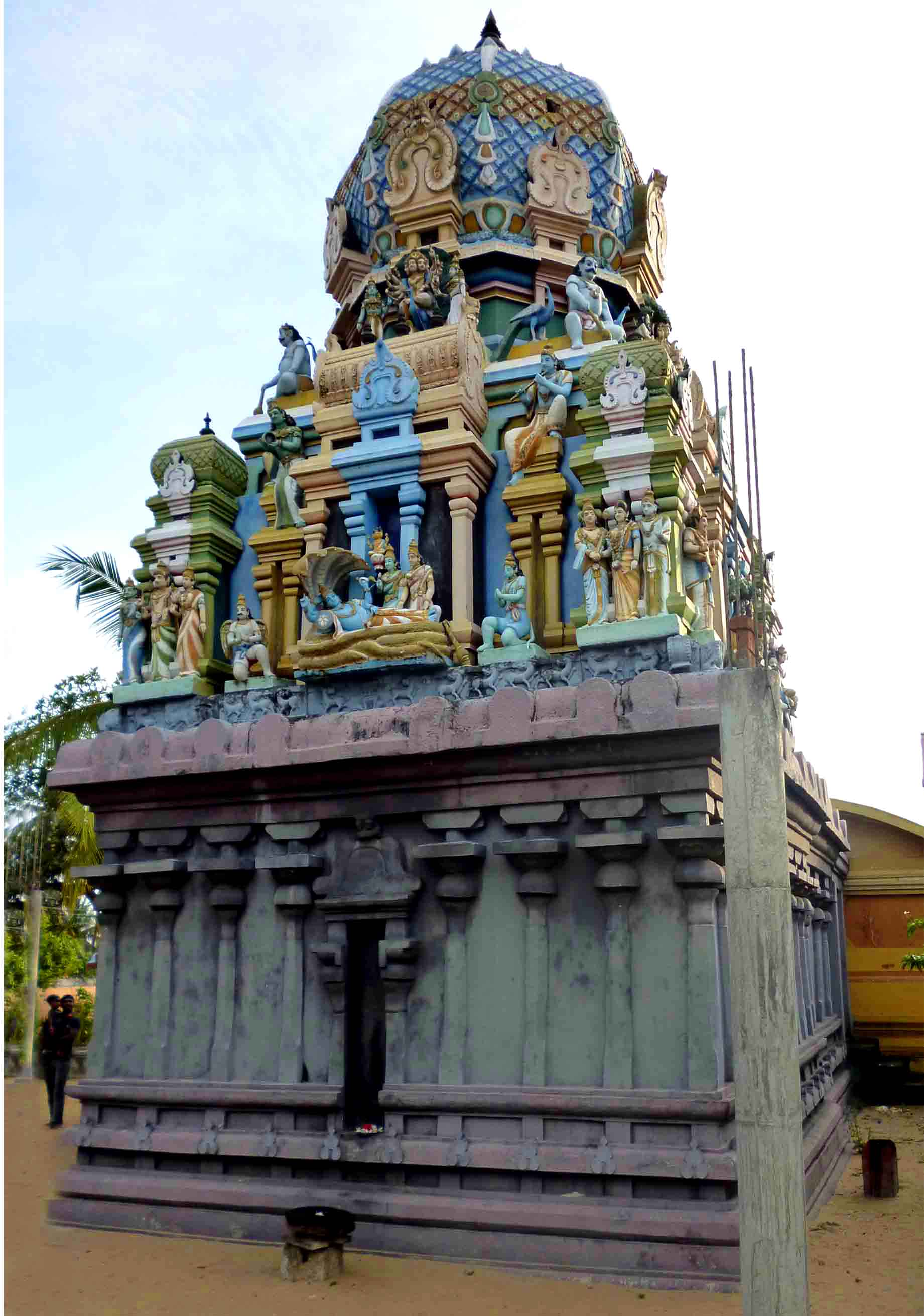
Sanctum of Thirukkovil Temple believed to manifest Pandyan Architecture.

Annual Festival of Thirukkovil is called as "Aadi Amavasai theertham" ("ஆடி அமாவாசைத் தீர்த்தம்""Āṭi amāvācait tīrttam" simply "tīrttam") which is a mega festival of South-East Sri Lanka. It is celebrated for 18 days and finished on Aadi Amavasya, the new moon day comes on Aadi month (July–August) of Tamil Hindu Calendar. Necrolatry carried out in the shore of Thirukkovil sea on an Aadi Amavasai is considered to give peace to the spirits of ancestors. A Dutch merchant Johann Herman Von Bree states about the Annual Festival of Thirukkovil where the assembly of "Dessave" (Chieftain) and the thousand of people of Batticaloa happened in July month of 1603 CE.

== Deterioration of Administration ==
Even after the colonial period, Temple was administrated by a conservative method based on clan system - பண்டு பரவணி ("Paṇṭu paravaṇi"). The வண்ணக்கர் (Vaṇṇakkar, the Batticaloan equivalent post for head of trustee), belongs to Vellalar caste of Thambiluvil village played a main role in the administration while "வன்னியனார்" (Vaṉṉiyaṉār - former kinglet of Batticaloa region) of Karavakupattu, belongs to Paṇikkaṉā matriclan of Mukkuvar caste supervised the rituals and other main activities of temple. Vaṇṇakkar is expected to be from Kantan kuty, one of the prominent matriclans of Thambiluvil village. Karavaku Vanniyanar is identified in the name of "Kovil Vanniyanar" during his temple activities.

A post named "வட்டாரப் பிரதிநிதி" (Vaṭṭārap piratiniti, Regional representatives) was given to each villages and "Pattus" of Batticaloa, from Panama to Kallady. Nur Yalman, a Turkish anthropologist observed "Kudukkai Kuruthal", a ritual based on Caste and Clan system, which was observed in another Thiruppadaikkovil Kokkadichcholai.

After the independence of the country, the reliability of Paṇṭu paravaṇi was questioned in the mid 20th Century and had to face many court cases. Since the old settlement around the temple was started to be distinguished as two villages separately - Thirukkovil and Thambiluvil, where the latter had the post of Vannakkar, the inhabitants of Thirukkovil raised their voice for the right to rule their own temple. And the old Mattakkalappu Desam divided de facto two new districts in 1961 - one remained in the same name while latter got the name "Amparai". As the capital of newly formed Batticaloa District, Mamangam, another ancient temple situated near Puliyantivu, which also celebrated its annual festival on Adi Amavasai, subsequently began to replace Thirukkovil in northern Batticaloa. As the results of these facts, Vaṭṭārap piratinitis north to Kalmunai ignore their responsibilities on temple. At last, Thirukkovil lost its primitive state significance permanently.

However, the Vannakkar-based Paṇṭu paravaṇi system still continues compromised along with the modern administration system of President, Secretary and Treasurer in which Kovil Vanniyanar post was integrated into President post. Hence, Thirukkovil Temple could maintain its position as "Tecathuk Kovil" with the homage of the Tamil inhabitants of Southern Batticaloa - known as Ampara District today. They still praise the guardian deity at Thirukkovil and celebrate his Mega fiesta "tīrttam" Festival annually with full of devotion and harmony.

== See also ==
- Thambiluvil Inscription
- Batticaloa Territory
- History of Eastern Tamils
- Thirukkovil
- Thambiluvil
- Thambiluvil Sri Kannaki amman temple
