= List of cities in Sri Lanka =

The following is a list of settlements in Sri Lanka with a population over 50,000.

== Cities ==
City	Image	DS Division	District	Province	Population		Area		Density (/km^{2})	Coordinates
City	Image	DS Division	District	Province	Conurbation (2012 est)	Municipality (2012 census)	km^{2}	mi^{2}	Density (/km^{2})	Coordinates
Colombo කොළඹ கொழும்பு		Colombo / Thimbirigasyaya	Colombo	Western	752,993	561,314	37	14	15,171	6°56′04″N 79°50′34″E
Dehiwala- Mount Lavinia දෙහිවල-ගල්කිස්ස தெஹிவளை-கல்கிசை		Dehiwala	Colombo	Western	245,974	184,468	21	8	8,784	6°50′23″N 79°52′33″E
Moratuwa මොරටුව மொறட்டுவை		Moratuwa	Colombo	Western	207,755	168,280	23	9	7,317	6°47′57″N 79°52′36″E
Sri Jayawardenepura Kotte ශ්‍රී ජයවර්ධනපුර කෝට්ටේ ஶ்ரீ ஜெயவர்த்தனபுரம் கோட்டை		Kotte	Colombo	Western	135,806	107,925	17	7	6,349	6°54′39″N 79°53′16″E
Negombo මීගමුව நீர்கொழும்பு		Negombo	Gampaha	Western	127,754	142,449	31	12	4,595	7°13′00″N 79°50′00″E
Kandy මහනුවර கண்டி		Kandy	Kandy	Central	125,351	98,828	27	10	3,660	7°17′47″N 80°38′06″E
Kalmunai කල්මුනේ கல்முனை		Kalmunai Muslim / Kalmunai Tamil / Sainthamarathu	Ampara	Eastern	106,783	99,893	23	9	4,343	7°25′00″N 81°49′00″E
Vavuniya වවුනියාව வவுனியா		Vavuniya	Vavuniya	Northern	99,653	34,816				8°45′00″N 80°29′00″E
Galle ගාල්ල காலி		Galle	Galle	Southern	99,478	86,333	17	7	5,078	6°02′03″N 80°12′59″E
Trincomalee ත්‍රිකුණාමලය திருகோணமலை		Trincomalee; Town and Gravets	Trincomalee	Eastern	99,135	48,351				8°34′00″N 81°14′00″E
Batticaloa මඩකලපුව மட்டக்களப்பு		Manmunai North	Batticaloa	Eastern	92,332	86,227	75	29	1,150	7°43′00″N 81°42′00″E
Jaffna යාපනය யாழ்ப்பாணம்		Jaffna / Nallur	Jaffna	Northern	88,138	80,829	20	8	4,041	9°40′00″N 80°00′00″E
Matale මාතලේ மாத்தளை		Matale	Matale	Central	78,864	38,299	25	10	4,051	7°28′7″N 80°37′22″E
Katunayake කටුනායක கட்டுநாயக்கா		Katana	Gampaha	Western	76,816	60,915	21		2,794	7°10′00″N 79°52′00″E
Dambulla දඹුල්ල தம்புள்ளை		Dambulla	Matale	Central	72,306	23,814	54	21	441	7°51′24″N 80°38′57″E
Kolonnawa කොලොන්නාව கொலன்னாவ		Kolonnawa	Colombo	Western	64,887	60,044				6°55′00″N 79°54′00″E
Anuradhapura අනුරාධපුරය அனுராதபுரம்		Anuradhapura	Anuradhapura	North Central	63,208	50,595	36	14	1,405	8°21′00″N 80°23′00″E
Ratnapura රත්නපුර இரத்தினபுரி		Ratnapura	Ratnapura	Sabaragamuwa	52,170	47,105	20	8	2,474	6°40′00″N 80°24′00″E
