= Thambiluvil =

Thambiluvil தம்பிலுவில் තම්බිලුවිල්
- Village
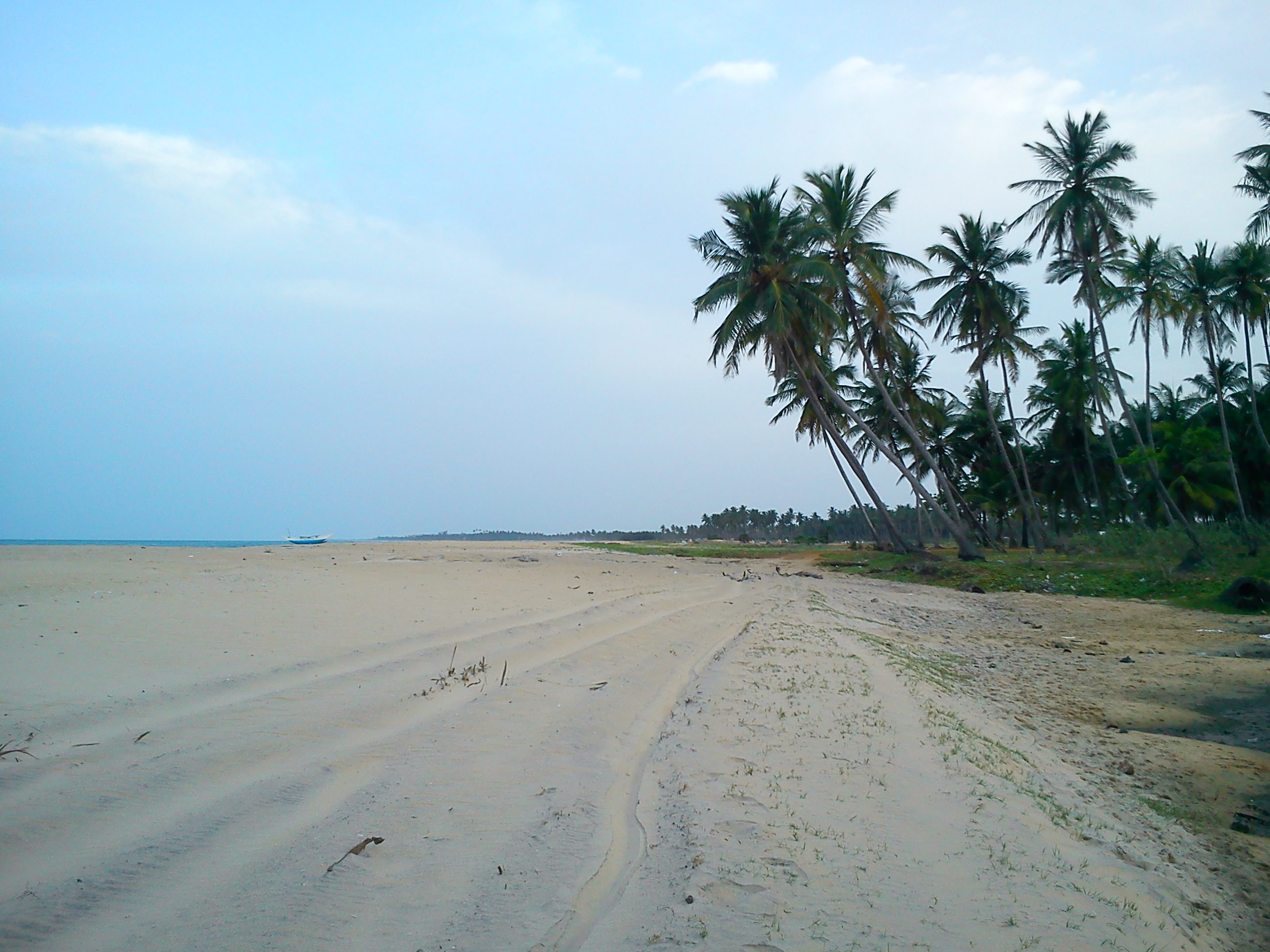
- Thambiluvil Beach

- Location within Sri Lanka
- Coordinates: 7°08′0″N 81°51′0″E
- Country: Sri Lanka
- Province: Eastern
- District: Ampara
- DS Division: Thirukkovil

Thambiluvil (Tamil: தம்பிலுவில்) is a coastal village situated in the Eastern Province of Sri Lanka. It is 78 kilometres (48 mi) south of Batticaloa, on the east coast of the island. Thambiluvil is known for its preservation of the Tamil culture, especially the traditions of the ancient Mattakkalappu Desam. It is also known for Periya Kalappu, an area that has a lagoon and rice paddys.

== Etymology ==
Medieval Tamil sources, compiled in Mattakkalappu Purva Sarithiram, claim that Megavarnan, the son of Chola princess Thampathi nallāḷ and Kalinga prince Puvaṉēka kayavāku, renovated the Thirukkovil Temple and constructed a memorial tank in the name of his mother, Tampativil (lit. Pond of Tampati). It is believed that Tampativil later became Tambiluvil.

Another theory suggests that Thambiluvil is derived from the words Thambal and Vil (Tamile: தம்பல் + வில்), which means "sludge puddle; pond". Oral reports from residents suggest that the original Thambiluvil villages spread north to Kolavil and south to Thandiyady and included a vast water source used for paddy cultivation near Koraikkalappu, a suburb of Thambiluvil.

== Background ==
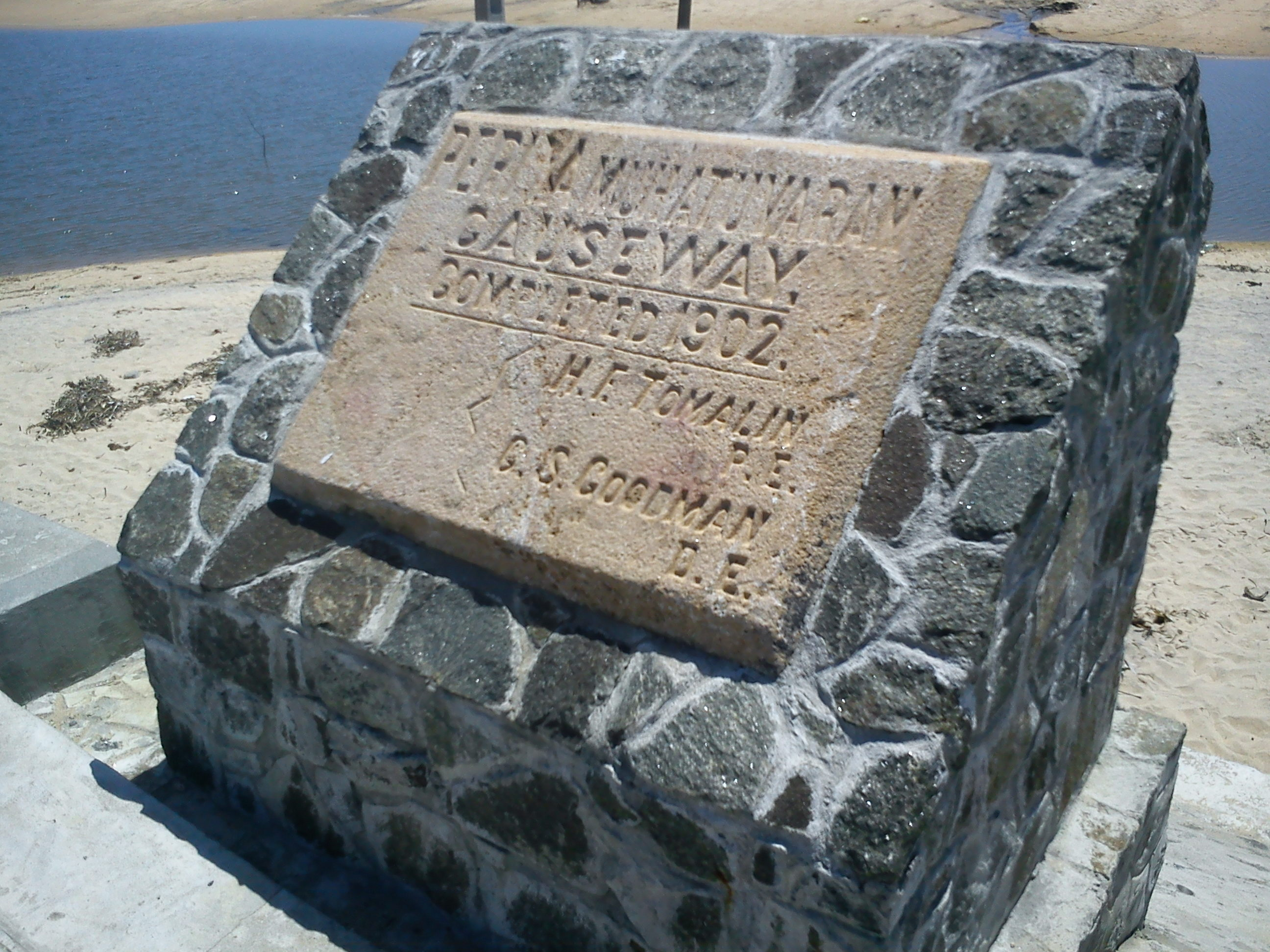
The inscription at Thambiluvil estuary dated 1902

Thambiluvil village covers an area of 5.2 square kilometres (2 sq mi), and has a population of 8,937 inhabitants, including 2,686 families. About 99.55% of the population are followers of Hindu Saivism, with a small Christian minority. The village is bordered by Thirukkovil village to the south and Thampaddai village to the north. The main industries are agriculture, animal husbandry, and fishing.

Thambiluvil, along with its southern sister village, Thirukkovil, were significant in the history of Eastern Tamils. The villages were part of Mattakkalappu Desam (lit. Batticaloa Country, corresponding to present day Batticaloa and Ampara Districts) until 1961 when the new Ampara District, located at the southern part of old Batticaloa District, was formed. According to oral history, Thambiluvil, Thirukkovil, and their suburbs were primitive settlements of the Nāga people, tribes of old Ceylon referred to as "Nagarmunai". The administration of the Thirukkovil Sithira Velayutha Swami Temple is carried out by locals, based on the maternal clan "Kuty" system, which was traditionally called "Pandu Paravani", although this tradition has since been abandoned. The Thambiluvil Inscription was found here and is now kept in the temple.

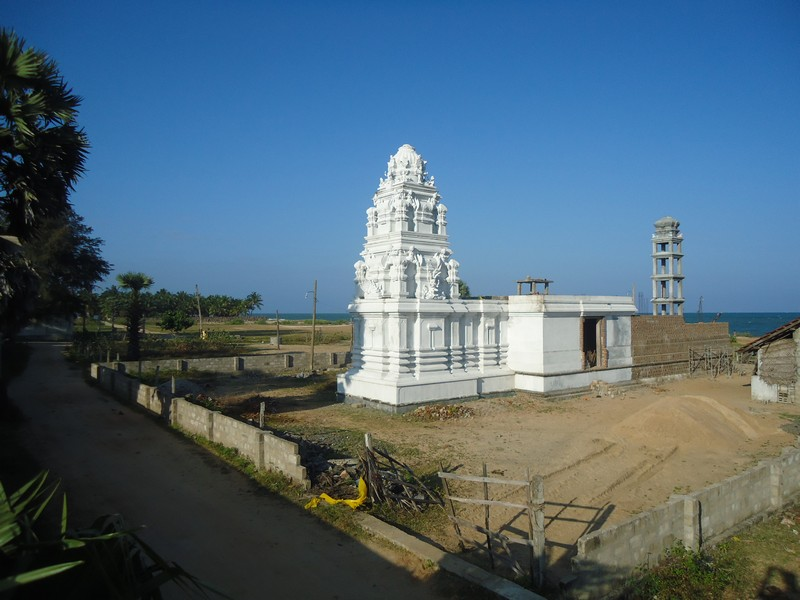
Thambiluvil Sivan Kovil under reconstruction following the 2004 Tsunami.

== Social significance ==
Thambiluvil was once known for practicing Nattu Koothu and Vasanthan (a kind of Kummi), which are traditional dances of the Batticaloa Tamils. These practices disappeared under the ethnic tensions of the Sri Lankan Civil War. The cult of the Kannaki Amman, prevalent throughout Sri Lanka, has also been observed there. Some legends suggest that Thambiluvil may have originated the Kannaki cult of Sri Lanka's east coast. The Thambiluvil Kannaki temple is highly regarded by the inhabitants of the area.

The anthropological and sociological significance of Thambiluvil, especially to Sri Lankan Tamils, has been described in the research of anthropologists including Nur Yalman, Dennis B. McGilvray, and Lester Hiatt.

== See also ==
- Thambiluvil Sri Kannaki amman temple
- Thambiluvil Madhya Maha Vidyalayam
- Thambiluvil Inscription
- Thirukkovil Sithira Velayutha Swami Kovil
