= Thambiluvil Central College =

- தம்பிலுவில் மத்திய கல்லூரி

Location
- Main Street; Thambiluvil, Ampara District 32415; Sri Lanka
- Coordinates: 7°07′14.90″N 81°51′09.60″E

Information
- School type: Public National 1AB
- Motto: Be learned, be good
- Religious affiliations: Saivism, Christianity
- Established: 1944
- Founder: A. Nadarasa
- Authority: Ministry of Education
- Principal: Mr. Vanniyasingam Jayanthan
- Grades: 6–13
- Gender: Co-educational
- Houses: Valluvar (Yellow), Ilango(Blue), Kambar(Green)

Thambiluvil Central College (Tamil: தம்பிலுவில் மத்திய கல்லூரி), abbreviated as TCC and formerly known as Thambiluvil Madhya Maha Vidyalayam) is a recently upgraded National school. It is located in Thambiluvil, Sri Lanka. TCC is the main school in Thirukkovil Educational Zone employing nearly 60 academic staff and enrolling approximately 1500 students.

== History ==
Methodist missionaries introduced modern educational methods to Thambiluvil in the later 19th century. A Methodist Boys school (Thambiluvil Saraswathi Vidyalayam) started in 1877, while a girls school (Thambiluvil Kalaimagal Vidyalayam) started in 1979 in former Batticaloa District.

Saivite Revivalism took root early in 19th century British Ceylon. This led the people to seek education based on native religion and reject Christian missionary schools. A. Nadarasa, a Thambiluvil noble, started a Saivite school in front of Thambiluvil Sri Kannaki amman temple in 1944.

In 1945, one Saivite and two Methodist schools operated there. They were taken over by the British Government of Ceylon and the Saivite school was relocated to the Methodist Girls' School premises with the name of "Junior School".

Grades One to Five were taught at Girls and Boys schools and whoever wished to continue their studies till Eighth grade was allowed to continue in Junior School. After the Independence of Ceylon, the Junior school was renamed "Maha Vidyalayam" in 1958 and relocated once more to its current premises where it grew quickly.

== Principals ==
- Mr. A. Nadarasa (1944–1945) Founder of Saivite School
- Mr. Sepamalai (1945–1953) Principal of Junior School
- Mr. K. Somasundaram (1953–1961)
- Mr. S. M. Leena (1961–1969)
- Mr. M. Pararajasingam (1969–1970)
- Mr. M. Sachithananda Sivam (1970–1984)
- Mr. P. Sathasivam (1984–1988)
- Mr. J. Jeyarajasingam (1988–1991)
- Mr. A. Kaneshamoorthy (1991)
- Mr. R. Nesarajah (1991–1994)
- Mr. A. Kaneshamoorthy (1994–1996)
- Mr. P. Sivapiragasam (1996–1997)
- Mr. S. Thavarajah (1997)
- Mr. A. Kaneshamoorthy (1998–2000)
- Mr. V. Jayanthan(2000–2009)
- Mr. T. Pushparaja (2009)
- Mr. S. Raventhiran (2010–2016)
- Mr. V. Jayanthan(2016–2018)
- Miss.K.Vasanthakohila (2018 - 2019)

== See also ==
- List of schools in Eastern Province, Sri Lanka
- Thambiluvil
