= Thambiluvil Kannaki Amman Temple =

Thambiluvil Kannaki Amman Kovil
- தம்பிலுவில் ஸ்ரீ கண்ணகை அம்மன் ஆலயம்
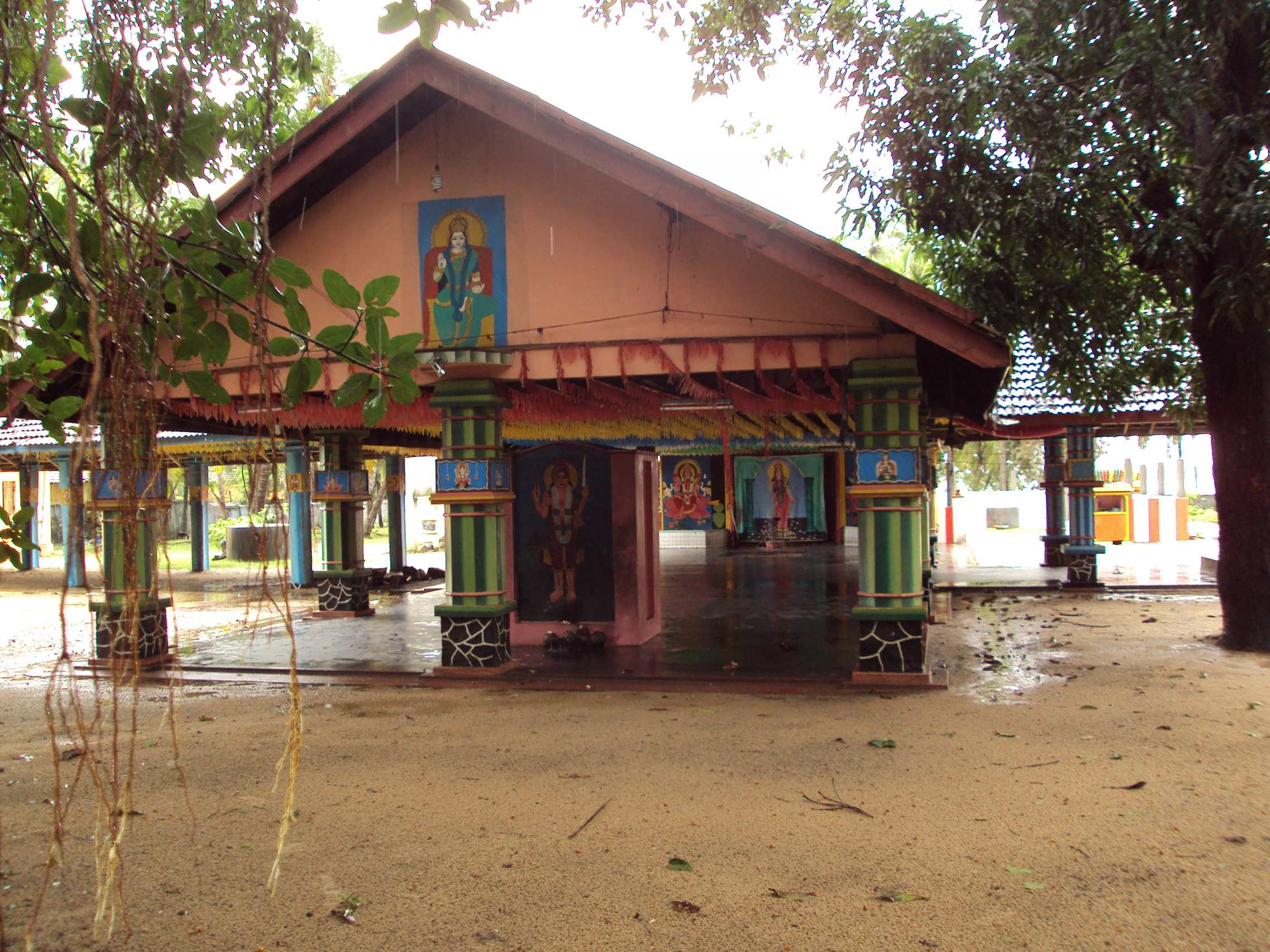
- Temple Entrance in Thambiluvil, Sri Lanka.

- Location in Sri Lanka

Religion
- Affiliation: Hinduism
- District: Ampara
- Province: Eastern

Location
- Country: Sri Lanka
- Interactive map of Thambiluvil Kannaki Amman Kovil
- Coordinates: 7°7′34″N 81°50′52″E

Thambiluvil Kannaki Amman Kovil (Tamil: தம்பிலுவில் கண்ணகி அம்மன் ஆலயம்) is one of the most significant Hindu temples in the Ampara District of Eastern Province, Sri Lanka. It is situated about 70 km (43 mi) south of Batticaloa and 11 km (6.8 mi)— south to Akkaraipattu. It is considered as one of the ancient temples of Mattakkalappu Desam (Batti - Ampara districts nowadays) made for Kannaki Amman, the heroine of the great Tamil epic Silappatikaram.

== History ==
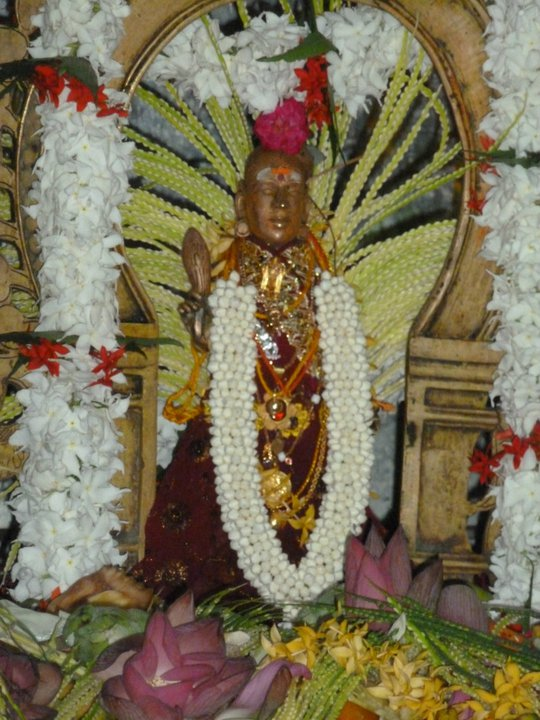
Idol of Kannaki Amman at Sanctum

Thambiluvil and its sister village Thirukkovil are considered as the ancient settlement of Nāga tribe thus called as "Nagarmunai". The cult of Kannaki is believed as the continuity of tribal worship of mother goddess of Nagas. The alternative name "Nāga Mangalai" (literally "the Auspicious Nāga") given to Kannaki only in the literary records of Thambiluvil and Pattimedu signifies the same.

The temple is believed to have been constructed after the arrival of Pattini cult by Gajabahu I during 113-135 CE. Another myth tells that the idols of three goddesses - Kannaki, Kali and Chenbaga Nachi arrived east coast of Ceylon through a merchant vessel from Tamilakam and three temples were built for them wherever they stopped. That three locations are identified nowadays as Thambiluvil, Sampur and Eachchilampattu respectively. However, so many historical evidences confirm that Thambiluvil temple was honored by the Kandyan and Kotte kings of Sri Lanka who ruled the island since 14th century CE. The ancient location of this temple is pointed out by the elders as "Urakkai", a paddy field land west to Thambiluvil village. They claimed that once, the idol of goddess was miraculously shown by a golden pigeon at Urakkai and Old temple at Urakkai was shifted to its present many years ago for unknown reasons.

An inscription of Vijayabahu VII of Kotte (1507-1521) known as "Thambiluvil Inscription" was found in this temple premises. It claims about the donation of "Vovil" by Vijayabahu to Sivagnāna Sankarar Kovil. Hugh Nevill (1848 – 1897) concluded that "Sivagnāna Sankarar Kovil" is none other than Thirukkovil Sithira Velayutha Swami Kovil and displaced the inscription there. According to this inscription, It may be assumed that an old temple built for Sivagnāna Sangarar (Lord Shiva) was replaced by Kannaki Amman from Urakkai after the destruction of that temple by Portuguese in 16th Century CE.

"Thambiluvil Mazhai Kāviyam" and "Thambiluvil Amman Pallu", two literary works made on this goddess praise the Kandyan kings Rajasingan(1635-1687) and Narendra Singan (1707-1739) and indicate their religious influences with the Kannaki Amman of this temple.

== Annual Festival ==
Annual Festival of Thambiluvil Kannaki Amman is celebrated on "Vaikāsi" month (May–June) of Tamil calendar along with other Kannaki Temples in Batticaloa region. It is called as "Kathavu Thiraththal" (Door Opening), "Vaikasi Pongal", "Amman Kulirthi" and so on. It is conducted for one week prior to or including full moon of Vaikasi month. The final day of Festival will be always a Monday. Chariot procession of the temple through the village is held on Sixth day of the festival (always on a Sunday night) and the next day is known as "Kulirthi Naal" (literally Cooling Day). Thousands of Devotees cook "Pongal" in the temple premises and offer it to the goddess in the midnight "Kulirthi" puja.

"Amman Kulirthi Kaaviyam" which describes her angry and sorrow during her lifetime is recited during the puja for requesting her calming down. Then, "Theertham" - The sacred water used to bathe the goddess during the Kulirthi ritual will be sprinkled over the devotees. The festival finishes with distributing offered Pongal to devotees and "Kathavu Adaiththal" (Door Closing of Sanctum).

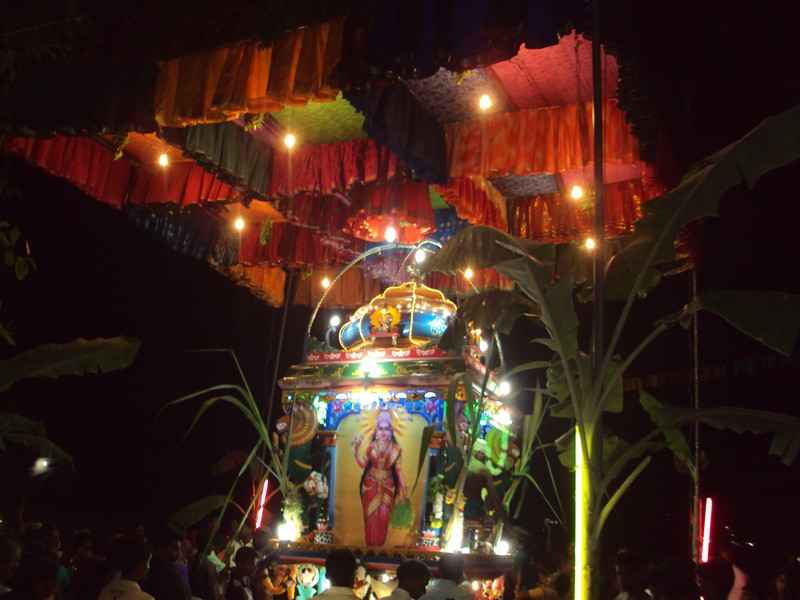
Temple Chariot under a Pandal (on 2012 Kulirthi Vizha)

== Kannaki Cult at Thambiluvil ==
Kannaki Amman Temple is built in non-Agamic tradition with simple four halls called as "Karuvarai"(Sanctum), "Mun Mandapam", "Nadu Mandapam" and maha Mandapam. Karuvarai and Mun Mandapam are closed always except from the festival season comes during May - June month. Pillayar, Vairavar and Nāga Thambirān are seated in separated shrines around the main temple of Kannaki. Pooja rituals are conducted in front of the closed doors of Mun Mandapam every Tuesday and Fridays.

The Aspects of Sri Lankan Pattini Cult - Kombu Vilayattu (Horn - play) and Porthengai (Coconut Play) was conducted till 1980s here and ceased due to the war conflict. One of the Priest of This Temple "Kannappan" lived in the time of Rajasinha II sung a verse on Goddess "Amman Mazhai Kaviyam" (மழைக் காவியம் - Raining Poetry) for relieving the country from a terrible draught. The inhabitants of this village still believe that it should be rained whenever this verse is recited with full of devotion during a drought season.
