= Kalmunai Divisional Secretariat =

Kalmunai Divisional Secretariat may refer to:

- Kalmunai Divisional Muslim Secretariat
- Kalmunai Divisional Tamil Secretariat
