= Addalaichenai =

Addalaichenai அட்டாளைச்சேனை අඪ්ඪලචෙන්නය
- City
- Location within Sri Lanka
- Coordinates: 7°14′0″N 81°51′0″E
- Country: Sri Lanka
- Province: Eastern
- District: Ampara
- DS Division: Addalaichenai

Government
  - Type: Pradeshiya Sabha
  - Chairman: ASM Uwais (SLMC)

thumb

Addalaichenai (Tamil: அட்டாளைச்சேனை) is a Town in the Ampara District of Sri Lanka derived its name from a classical origin "Addalai Chenai" in which Addalai (அடளை) means a place made for protect the cultivation at higher places, and Chenai (சேனை) means crop cultivation. However many is of the opinion that farmers origin is also behind the framing of the name Addalaichenai. The village Addalaichenai was being part of Akkaripattu up to 1978 and then separated from Akkaraipattu. Addalaichenai came to be regarded as the country's agricultural important place in 1978 when the DRO office was formed. Addalaichenai has been well known by traders from almost 2000 years ago.

Prior to the establishment of the Divisional Secretariat in 1991, the office of the Assistant Government Agent was functioning as the institution catering to the day to day news of the people in the division.

which was in view on office of the Assistant Government Agent was opened on October 10, 1973 in Addalaichenai consisting Palamunai, Oluvil, Deegawapiya and Thiraikerny hamlets. This office is situated on the main road near the 36th mile post from Batticaloa to Akkaraipattu in the coastal belt of Ampara District.

On the north there is the Kaliodai river, on the south Akkaraipattu D.S. Office Boundary and drainage road. On the east Bay of Bengal, on the west a vast stretch of Paddy Lands and the eastern boundaries of Sammanthurai, Irakkaman and Damana Divisional Secretariat.

== History of Addalaichenai Divisional Secretariat ==
Prior to October 10, 1973, the Addalaichenai Division was alliterate with the Akkaraipattu Division. After this date a separate division was carved out from Akkaraipattu and named as Addalaichenai Division. At that time there was a voluntary organization namely "Social Service Society" which was instruments in greeting this new with the able assistance of the late M.M. Musthapha, Member of Parliament and Deputy Minister of Finance.

Late Mr. Senerath Somarathne, M.P. and political authorities of the Ampara District was good enough to allocate sufficient funds from DCB to construct the present building complex.

== Role performed at DS ==
Name	From	To
S. Rangaraja	1978	1979
Wijayawardene	1979	1980
Piyasena	1980	1981
G.A.C. De Silva	1981	1984
Rajapaksha	1984	1985
A. Abdul Majeed	1985	1987
S. Umar	1987	1989
K.M.A. Cader	1989	1990
K. Samdudeen	1990	1991
A.H.M. Ansar	1991	1993
U.L.A. Azeez	1993	2005
U.L. Niyas	2005	2008
I.M. Haniffa (Acting)	2008	2009
M.M. Nazeer	2009	2011
I.M. Haniffa	2012	
MS.Udhumalebbe	2013	2015
