= Sammanthurai 10 Grama Niladhari Division =

Sammanthurai 10
- Coordinates: 7.368287°N 81.799069°E
- Country: Sri Lanka
- Province: Eastern Province
- District: Ampara District
- Divisional Secretariat: Samanthurai Divisional Secretariat
- Electoral District: Digamadulla Electoral District
- Polling Division: Samanthurai Polling Division

Population (2012)
  - Total: 789
- ISO 3166 code: LK-5218070

Sammanthurai 10 Grama Niladhari Division

Sammanthurai 10 Grama Niladhari Division is a Grama Niladhari Division of the Samanthurai Divisional Secretariat, of Ampara District, of Eastern Province, Sri Lanka.

== Demographics ==
=== Ethnicity ===
Sammanthurai 10 by Ethnicity
1. Sinhalese (0.00%)
2. Sri Lankan Tamil (10.4%)
3. Indian Tamil (0.00%)
4. Moor (89.6%)
5. Malay (0.00%)
6. Burgher (0.00%)
7. Chetty (0.00%)
8. Bharatha (0.00%)
9. Others (0.00%)

=== Religion ===
Sammanthurai 10 by Religion
1. Buddhist (0.00%)
2. Hindu (10.4%)
3. Islam (89.6%)
4. Roman Catholic (0.00%)
5. Other Christian (0.00%)
6. Others (0.00%)
