= Ninthavur 21 Grama Niladhari Division =

Ninthavur 21
- Interactive map of Ninthavur 21
- Coordinates: 7.342156°N 81.849053°E
- Country: Sri Lanka
- Province: Eastern Province
- District: Ampara District
- Divisional Secretariat: Ninthavur Divisional Secretariat
- Electoral District: Digamadulla Electoral District
- Polling Division: Kalmunai Polling Division

Population (2012)
  - Total: 608
- ISO 3166 code: LK-5230105

Ninthavur 21 Grama Niladhari Division

Ninthavur 21 Grama Niladhari Division is a Grama Niladhari Division of the Ninthavur Divisional Secretariat, of Ampara District, of Eastern Province, Sri Lanka.

== Demographics ==
=== Ethnicity ===
Ninthavur 21 by Ethnicity
1. Sinhalese (0.00%)
2. Sri Lankan Tamil (0.00%)
3. Indian Tamil (0.30%)
4. Moor (99.7%)
5. Malay (0.00%)
6. Burgher (0.00%)
7. Chetty (0.00%)
8. Bharatha (0.00%)
9. Others (0.00%)

=== Religion ===
Ninthavur 21 by Religion
1. Buddhist (0.00%)
2. Hindu (0.20%)
3. Islam (99.8%)
4. Roman Catholic (0.00%)
5. Other Christian (0.00%)
6. Others (0.00%)
