= Sammanthurai Divisional Secretariat =

- Divisional Secretariat
- Country: Sri Lanka
- Province: Eastern Province
- District: Ampara District

Government
  - Divisional Secretary: A.Mansoor
- Time zone: UTC+5:30 (Sri Lanka Standard Time)
- Postal code: 32200
- Area code: 067
- Website: http://www.sammanthurai.ds.gov.lk/

Sammanthurai Divisional Secretariat is a Divisional Secretariat of Ampara District, of Eastern Province, Sri Lanka.

== Demography-Religion ==
Religion in Sammanthurai DS Division (2012)
1. Buddhist (0.60%)
2. Hindu (11.7%)
3. Muslim (86.6%)
4. Roman Catholic (0.50%)
5. Other Christian (0.60%)
6. Other (0.00%)

== History ==
It was formed as a Divisional Registrar's office (DRO) in 1944. Mr.I.Mohaiyadeen was the first Divisional Registrar. And also it was upgraded as an Assistant Government Agent (AGA) office in 1972 and Mr.B.P.Tambinayaham was the first Assistant Government Agent. Thereafter it was changed as a Divisional Secretariat in 1993 and Mr.A.Mansoor was the first Divisional Secretary.

== Location ==
Sammanthurai Divisional Secretariat is situated at 19 km east of Ampara town. It is boundary of North of Navithanveli Divisional Secretariat, South of Irakkamam Divisional Secretary's Division East of Karaitivu Divisional Secretary's Division and West of Ampara Urban Council.

== Size and population ==
The total area of this division is about 132.8 squares kilo meters. Consists of 51 Grama Niladhari divisions. The population statistics report of 2010 shores 68591 members, this is made up of Muslims 85.22%, Tamils 14.49% Sinhalese 0.09% and others 02%, and over 64% of families are farmers.

== Divisions ==
The Sammanthurai Divisional Secretariat has a number of departments or divisions such as Administration, Financial management, Land, Social services, Planning, Samurdhi and additional Registrar's division
