= Vinayagapuram, Sri Lanka =

Vinayagapuram விநாயகபுரம்
- Village
- Location within Sri Lanka
- Coordinates: 7°08′0″N 81°51′0″E
- Country: Sri Lanka
- Province: Eastern
- District: Ampara
- DS Division: Thirukkovil

Vinayagapuram (Tamil: விநாயகபுரம்) is a Tamil village in the Thirukkovil Divisional Secretariat Division of the Ampara District in the Eastern Province of Sri Lanka. In the early days, all the land that was once a coastal land was ceded to the state and distributed to the landless in 1959. The village was named Vinayagapuram in 1962 as a settlement village.

== Schools ==
- Parameshwara Vidyalayam
- Shakthy Vidyalayam
- Kanishda Vidyalayam
- Vinayagapuram Madhya Maha Vidyalayam
