= Kudinilam =

Village in Thirukkovil, Sri Lanka

Coordinates: 7.1262538°N 81.82995040000003°E

Kudinilam (Tamil: குடிநிலம்) is a village in the town Thirukkovil of Sri Lanka. It is situated along the eastern coast of the island. It is 2.9:km of Tirukovil and 35.6:km, 33 mins drive north of Pottuvil. It was under Thirukkovil town.

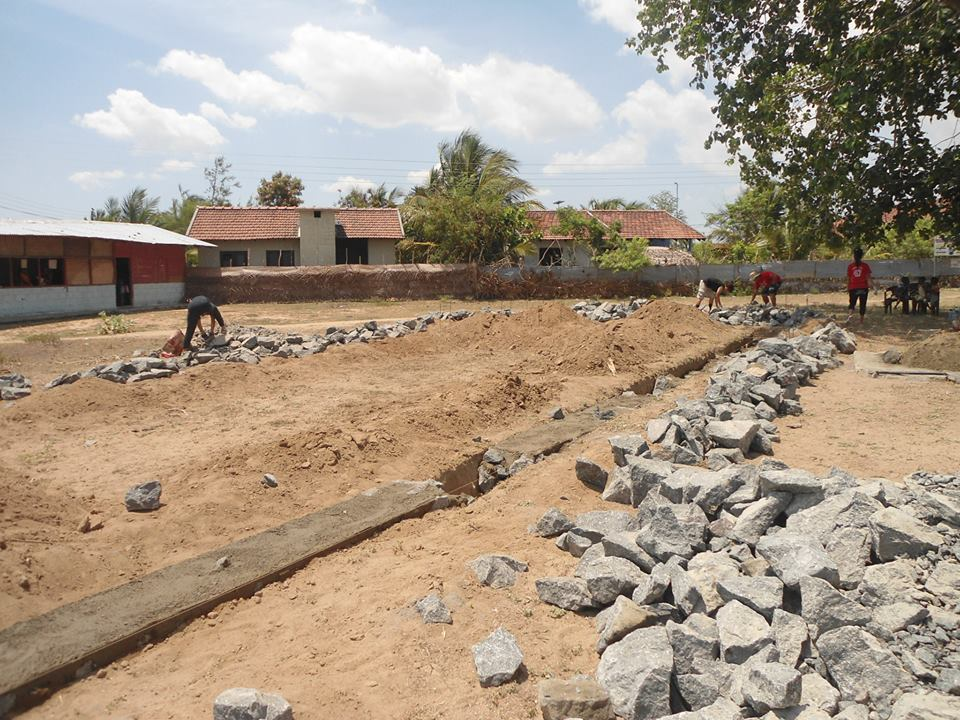
build new school

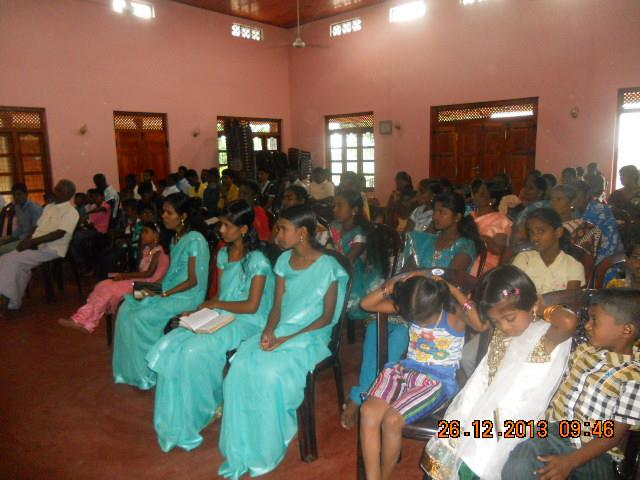
Kudinilam

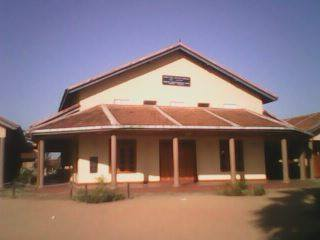
Kudinilam Hall

Open New Bus Stop
