= Batticaloa Museum =

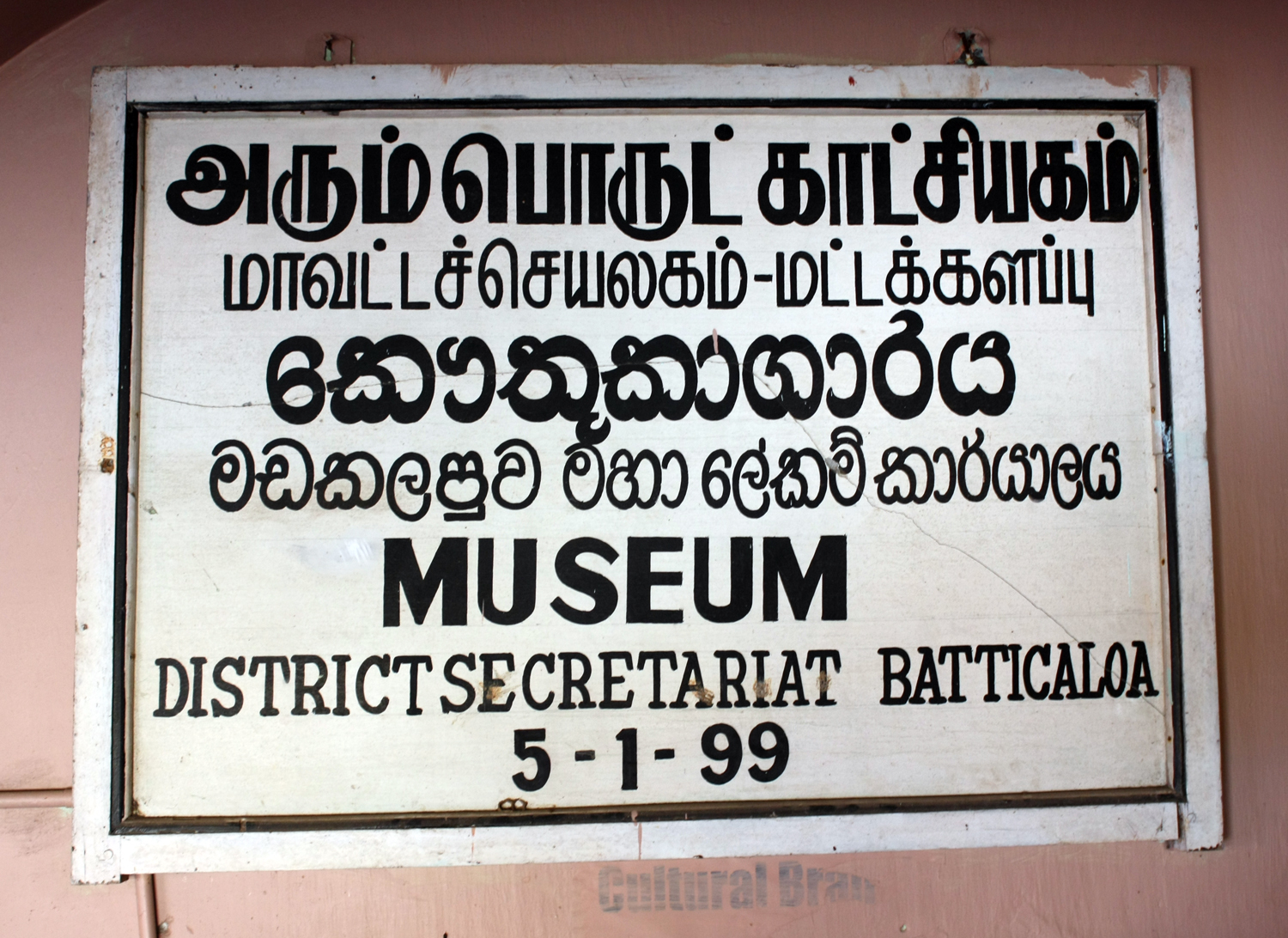
- Name board of Batticaloa Museum above the door

- Location in central Batticaloa
- Established: 1999
- Location: Batticaloa, Sri Lanka
- Coordinates: 7°42′41.66″N 81°42′7.83″E
- Type: History
- Visitors: A few

Batticaloa Museum is a small museum, which is located in inside of Batticaloa Fort, Batticaloa, Sri Lanka. It was founded in 1999. The museum has rare items such as palm-leaf manuscripts, British era government items, tools and utensils.

== Gallery ==
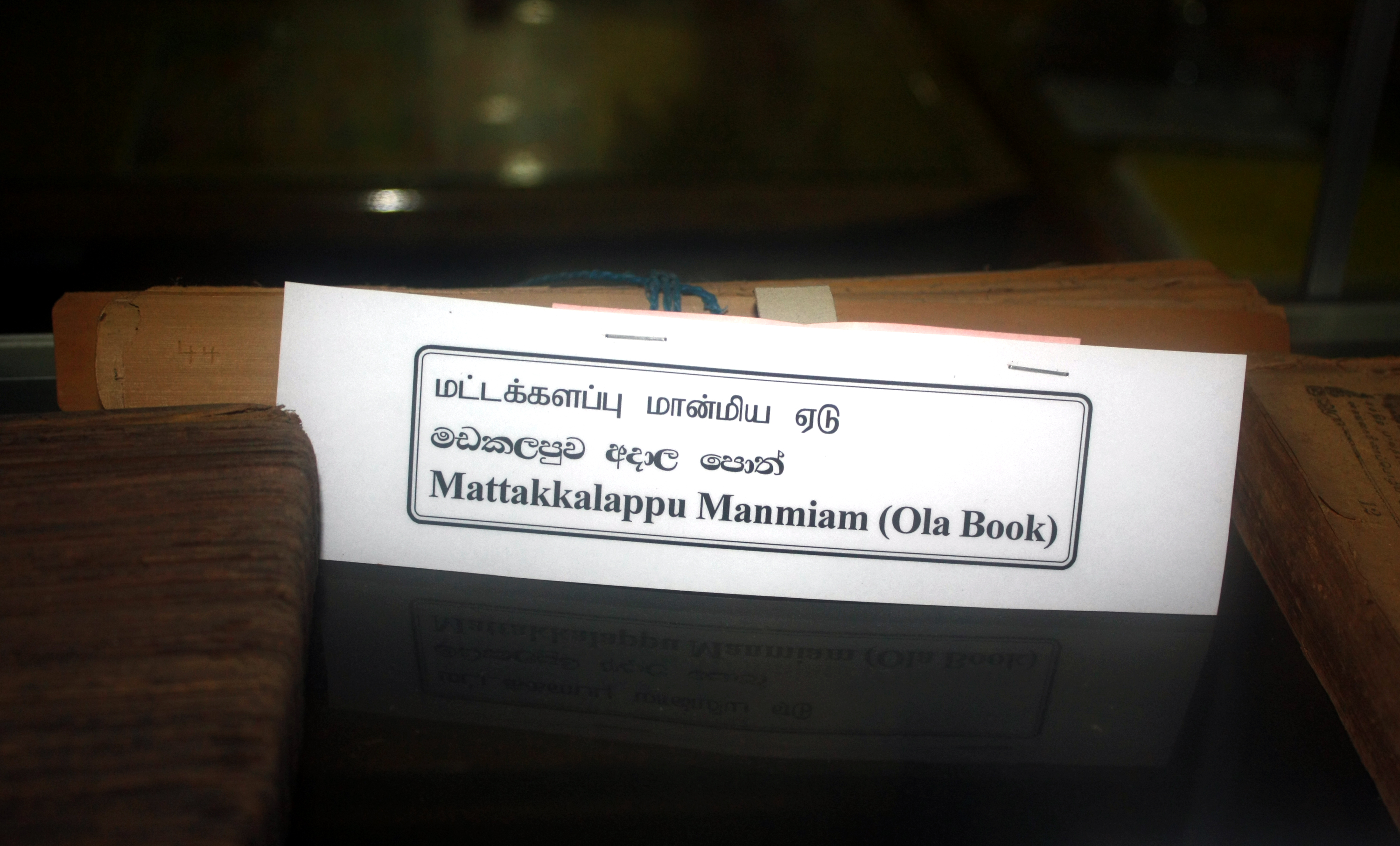
Palm-leaf manuscript of the Mattakallappu Manmiyam book

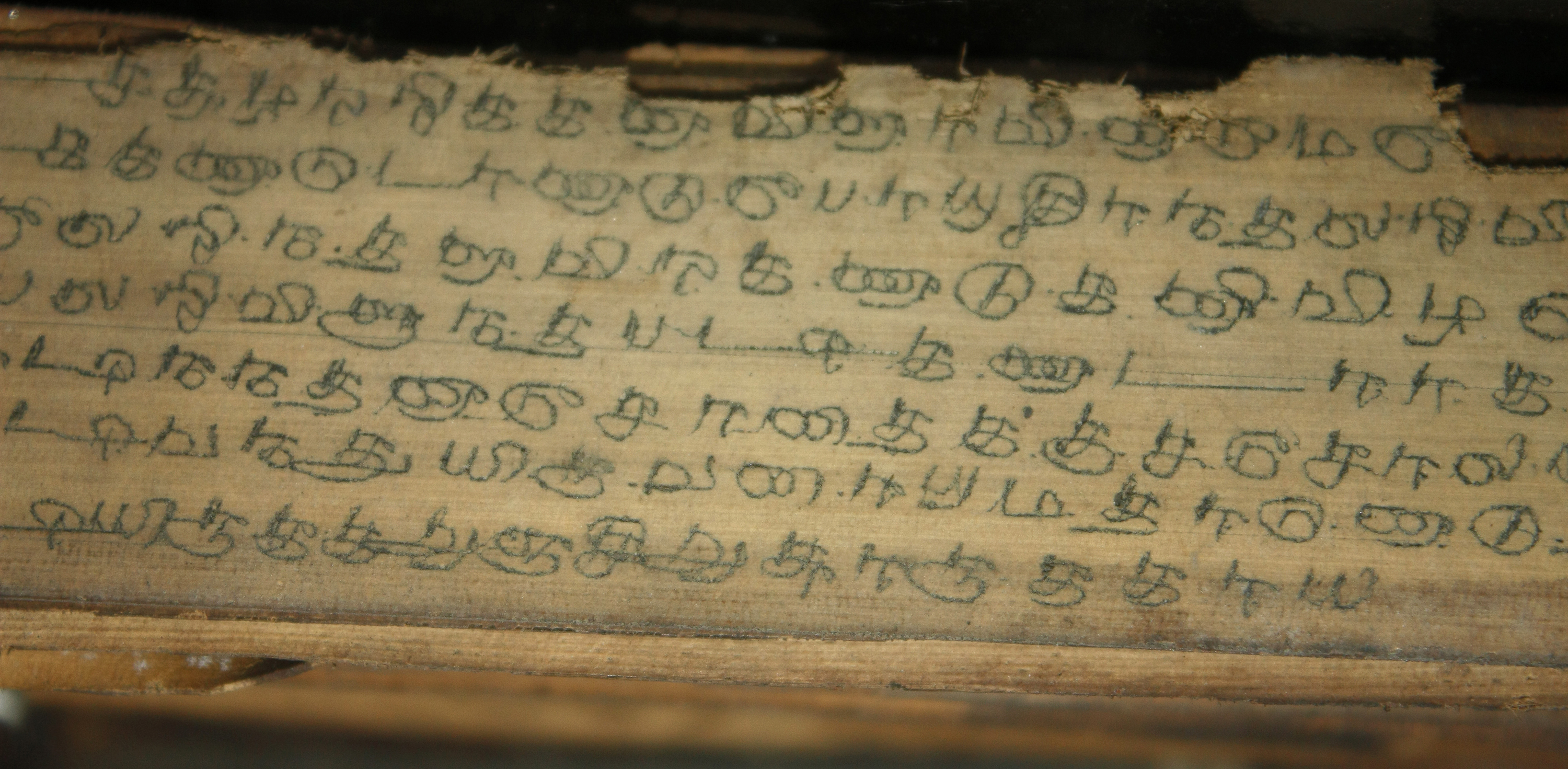
A palm-leaf manuscript

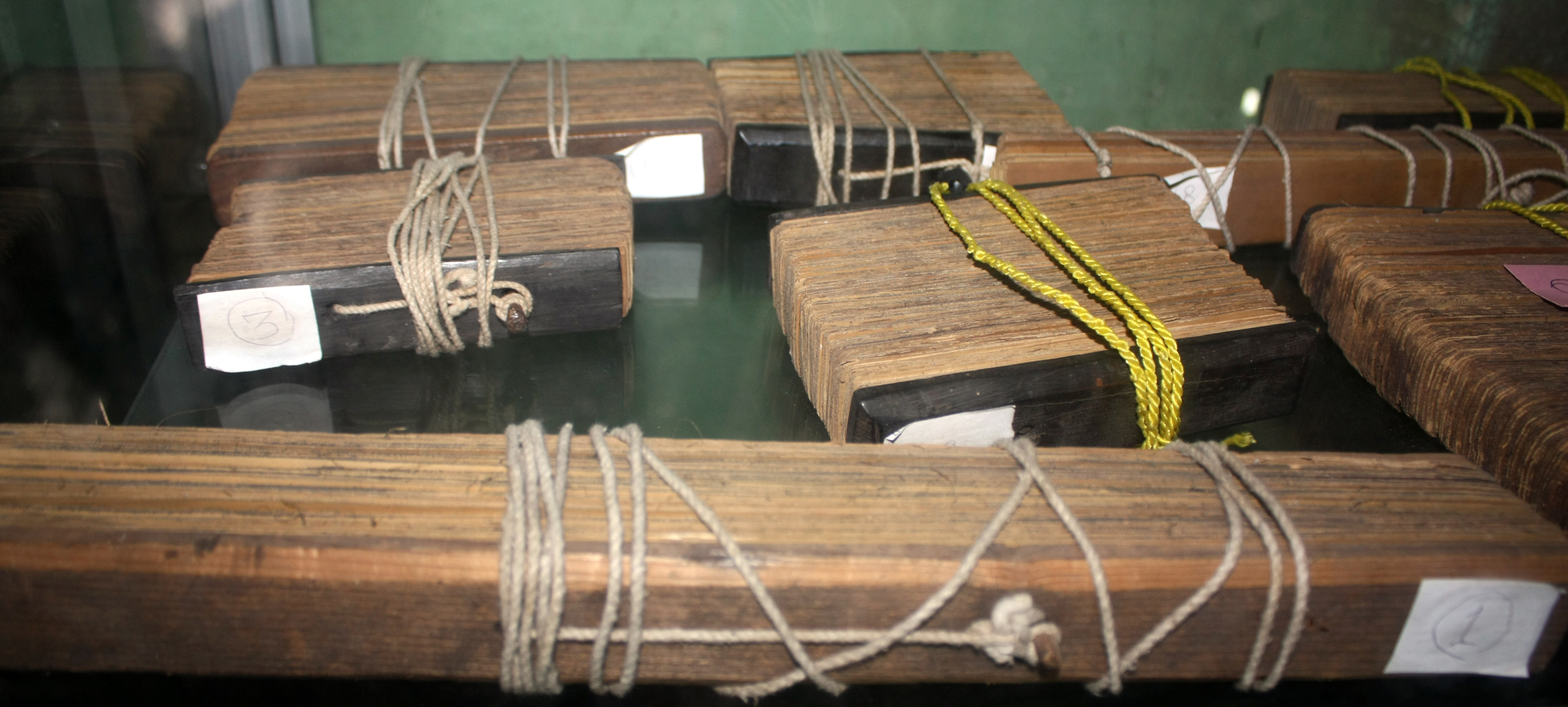
Palm-leaf manuscripts
