= Thirukkovil Divisional Secretariat =

- Divisional Secretariat
- Interactive map of Thirukkovil Divisional Secretariat
- Country: Sri Lanka
- Province: Eastern Province
- District: Ampara District

Area
  - Total: 212.12 km^{2} (81.90 sq mi)

Population (2011)
  - Total: 29,860
- Time zone: UTC+5:30 (Sri Lanka Standard Time)
- Website: http://www.ds.thirukkovil.com/

Thirukkovil Divisional Secretariat is a Divisional Secretariat of Ampara District, of Eastern Province, Sri Lanka.

== Demography-Religion ==
Religion in Thirukkovil DS Division (2012)
1. Buddhist (0.50%)
2. Hindu (94.8%)
3. Muslim (0.00%)
4. Roman Catholic (1.60%)
5. Other Christian (3.10%)
6. Other (0.00%)

== GS Divisions ==
- Thampaddai –01
- Thampaddai –02
- Thambiluvil - 01 East
- Thambiluvil - 01 West
- Thambiluvil - 01 South
- Thambiluvil - 02 East
- Thambiluvil - 02 West
- Thambiluvil - 02 North
- Thirukkovil - 01
- Thirukkovil - 02
- Thirukkovil - 03
- Thirukkovil - 04
- Vinayagapuram, Sri Lanka -01
- Vinayagapuram, Sri Lanka-02
- Vinayagapuram, Sri Lanka-03
- Vinayagapuram, Sri Lanka-04
- saagamam
- Kanchirankuda
- Kanchikudicharu
- Thankavelayuthapuram
- Thandiyadi
- sankamangiramam
