= Akkaraipattu Muslim Central College =

Coordinates: 7.2256°N 81.8381°E

- Akkaraipattu; Sri Lanka

Information
- Type: National School (Sri Lanka)
- Motto: ஓதி உணர்ந்து ஒழுகு
- Established: 10 June 1946
- Principal: M.A.Salahudeen (2025)
- Grades: Class 1 - 13
- Gender: Male and Female
- Age: 6 to 19
- Song: உலக இரட்சக நாயனே

AKP MC College (அக்கரைப்பற்று முஸ்லிம் மத்திய கல்லூரி), an education provider for the Muslim Community was founded in 1946 in the green city of South Eastern Sri Lanka, Akkaraipattu. It became the sixteenth National Muslim School in Sri Lanka and third National School in the Eastern Province in 1992.

== Primary school ==
The primary school has students from grade 1–5.

== Junior Secondary School ==
Junior Secondary School comprises grade 6-9 . A school-based assessment system is introduced during this stage and students undergo evaluation on a weekly basis apart from term exam. An English Medium Secondary section runs parallel to the usual Tamil Medium. A provincial level evaluation exam is held the end of Grade nine.

== Senior Secondary School ==
This comprises grades 10 – 13 with two segments i.e. Grades 10 and 11 for G.C.E Ordinary Level and Grades 12 and 13 for G.C.E Advanced Level. In ordinary level students sit for nine core subjects and three optional subjects. Advanced Level students are offered three compulsory subjects in four streams namely Biological Science, Physical Science, Commerce and Arts. A pass in the common general paper is compulsory to enter the university. IT and General English are offered.

== Infrastructures ==
Academic

- Class room blocks
- Libraries
- Multimedia Resource Center
- Computer Learning Center
- Science laboratories
- Music room
- smart classrooms

Sports

- Play ground with pavilion
- Basketball court
- Indoor sports complex
- swimming pool with pavilion

Accommodation

- Boys hostel

Medical Service

- Dental Unit
- First Aid Unit
- Student Counseling Unit

Other

- Mosque
- Auditorium
- Administrative block
- Cafeteria

== Notable alumni ==
Name	Year/degree	Notability	Reference
A. L. M. Athaullah		Member of Parliament - Ampara (2000–2015), Minister of Local Government & Provincial Councils (2010–2015)	
