= Akkaraipattu Municipal Council =

Type
- Type: Local Authority

Leadership
- Mayor: Atha Ulla Ahamathulebbe Maraikkar, NC
- Deputy Mayor: Uwais Uthuma Lebbe, NC

Structure
- Seats: 22
- Political groups: Government (11): NC (11); Opposition (11): NPP (4); SLMC (3); ACMC (2); SJB (1); Ind (1)

Elections
- Last election: 6 May 2025
- Next election: TBD

Website
- http://akkaraipattu.mc.gov.lk/

Akkaraipattu Municipal Council (AMC) is the local authority for Akkaraipattu in south-eastern Sri Lanka. AMC is responsible for providing a variety of local public services including roads, sanitation, drains, housing, libraries, public parks and recreational facilities. It has nine members elected using the open list proportional representation system.

== History ==
Akkaraipattu Municipal Council was created with effect from 1 April 2011 from parts of Akkaraipattu Rural Council (Akkaraipattu Pradesha Sabhai or Akkaraipattu Pradeshiya Sabha). The Campaign for Free and Fair Elections (CaFFE), an independent election monitoring organisation, criticised the hasty creation of AMC, stating that Local Government Minister A. L. M. Athaullah had not followed proper procedures. CaFFE pointed out that a Rural Council is usually promoted to Urban Council before being promoted to a Municipal Council whereas AMC had received a "double=promotion". The creation of AMC had left Akkaraipattu Rural Council with just five election centres and only 4,000 electors. CaFFE also stated that the promotion of Trincomalee Urban Council and Ampara Urban Council to Municipal Council had long been discussed but ignored by Athaullah. Akkaraipattu is Athaullah's local electorate and according to CaFFE Athaullah was "trying to gain political mileage from the elevation".

== Election results ==
=== 2011 local government election ===
Results of the local government election held on 17 March 2011:

Alliances and parties	Votes	%	Seats
National Congress (United People's Freedom Alliance)	11,821	77.15%	8
Sri Lanka Muslim Congress	2,819	18.40%	1
Independent 1	548	3.58%	0
United National Party	98	0.64%	0
Independent 6	31	0.20%	0
Independent 4	3	0.02%	0
Independent 5	1	0.01%	0
Independent 7	1	0.01%	0
Independent 2	0	0.00%	0
Independent 3	0	0.00%	0
Valid Votes	15,322	100.00%	9
Rejected Votes	444		
Total Polled	15,766		
Registered Electors	20,971		
Turnout	75.18%		

The following candidates were elected: Abdul Gaffoor Asmy; Ahamed Zackie Athaullah (NC); Sinna Lebbe Mohamed Haniffa; Noor Mohamed Najimudeen; Mohamed Mohideen Mohamed Nilam; Mohamed Mohideen Mohamed Rizam (NC); Sainulabdeen Mohamed Safees; Aatham Lebbe Thavam; and Kalanthar Lebbe Mohamed Zarook.

Ahamed Zackie Athaullah (NC) and Mohamed Mohideen Mohamed Rizam (NC) were appointed Mayor and Deputy Mayor respectively. Ahamed Zackie Athaullah (NC) is the son of Local Government Minister A. L. M. Athaullah.
