= Alayadiwembu Divisional Secretariat =

- Divisional Secretariat
- Interactive map of Alayadiwembu Divisional Secretariat
- Coordinates: 7°10′29″N 81°47′17″E
- Country: Sri Lanka
- Province: Eastern Province
- District: Ampara District
- Time zone: UTC+5:30 (Sri Lanka Standard Time)

Alayadiwembu Divisional Secretariat is a Divisional Secretariat of Ampara District, of Eastern Province, Sri Lanka.

== Demography-Religion ==
Religion in Alayadiwembu DS Division (2012)
1. Buddhist (1.10%)
2. Hindu (85.5%)
3. Muslim (0.10%)
4. Roman Catholic (8.80%)
5. Other Christian (4.50%)
6. Other (0.00%)
