= Karaitivu Divisional Secretariat =

- Divisional Secretariat
- Country: Sri Lanka
- Province: Eastern Province
- District: Ampara District
- Time zone: UTC+5:30 (Sri Lanka Standard Time)

Karaitivu Divisional Secretariat is a Divisional Secretariat of Ampara District, of Eastern Province, Sri Lanka.

== Demography-Religion ==
Religion in Karaitivu DS Division (2012)
1. Buddhist (0.20%)
2. Hindu (58.1%)
3. Muslim (40.1%)
4. Roman Catholic (0.60%)
5. Other Christian (1.00%)
6. Other (0.00%)
