= Eragama Divisional Secretariat =

Irakkamam Divisional Secretariat
- Divisional Secretariat
- Country: Sri Lanka
- Province: Eastern Province
- District: Ampara District
- Time zone: UTC+5:30 (Sri Lanka Standard Time)

Eragama Divisional Secretariat is a Divisional Secretariat of Ampara District, of Eastern Province, Sri Lanka.

== Demography-Religion ==
Religion in Eragama DS Division (2012)
1. Buddhist (6.60%)
2. Hindu (2.50%)
3. Muslim (90.9%)
4. Roman Catholic (0.00%)
5. Other Christian (0.00%)
6. Other (0.00%)

== See also ==
- Irakkamam
