= Irakkamam =

Irakkamam இறக்காமம் එරගම
- City
- Location within Sri Lanka
- Coordinates: 7°15′0″N 81°43′0″E
- Country: Sri Lanka
- Province: Eastern
- District: Ampara
- DS Division: Irakkamam

Area
  - Total: 8,430 ha (20,800 acres)

Population (2018)
  - Total: 12,554

Irakkamam or Eragama is a town located in the Eragama Divisional Secretariat, Ampara District, Eastern Province, Sri Lanka which is an ancient village in south eastern as well. A tile factory is located in the territories of the town. After 1985, there was a massive growth in terms of education, culture, business and other sectors.

== See also ==
- Irakkamam Divisional Secretariat Office
