= Navithanveli Divisional Secretariat =

- Divisional Secretariat
- Country: Sri Lanka
- Province: Eastern Province
- District: Ampara District
- Time zone: UTC+5:30 (Sri Lanka Standard Time)

Navithanveli Divisional Secretariat is a Divisional Secretariat of Ampara District, of Eastern Province, Sri Lanka.

== Demography-Religion ==
Religion in Navithanveli DS Division (2012)
1. Buddhist (1.00%)
2. Hindu (54.8%)
3. Muslim (34.2%)
4. Roman Catholic (9.00%)
5. Other Christian (1.00%)
6. Other (0.00%)

== GS Divisions ==
- Navithanveli 01
- Navithanveli 02
- Chavalakadai
- Annamalai 01
- Annamalai 02
- Annamalai 03
- Sorikalmunai 01
- Sorikalmunai 02
- Sorikalmunai 03
- Chalambaikeny 01
- Chalambaikeny 02
- Chalambaikeny 03
- Chalambaikeny 04
- Chalambaikeny 05
- Central Camp 01
- Central Camp 02
- Central Camp 03
- Central Camp 04
- Central Camp 05
- Central Camp 06
