= Ampara Urban Council =

Type
- Type: Local authority

Leadership
- Chairman: Indika Upathissa Wijewickrama, (NPP) since 6 May 2025
- Deputy Chairman: Kalum Horeshes Madame Aarachchi, (NPP) since 6 May 2025

Structure
- Seats: 17
- Political groups: Government: NPP (10); Opposition: SJB (3); Independents (2); SLPP (1); PA (1)

Elections
- Last election: 6 May 2025
- Next election: TBA

Ampara Urban Council (AUC) is the local authority for the town of Ampara in eastern Sri Lanka. AUC is responsible for providing a variety of local public services including roads, sanitation, drains, housing, libraries, public parks and recreational facilities. It has 9 members elected using the open list proportional representation system.

== Election results ==
=== 1983 local government election ===
Results of the local government election held on 18 May 1983:

Alliances and parties	Votes	%	Seats
United National Party	3,140	49.62%	5
Independent	2,280	36.03%	3
Sri Lanka Freedom Party	908	14.35%	1
Valid Votes	6,328	100.00%	9
Rejected Votes	49		
Total Polled	6,377		
Registered Electors	9,467		
Turnout	67.36%		

=== 2002 local government election ===
Results of the local government election held on 25 March 2002:

Alliances and parties	Votes	%	Seats
United National Party	5,462	66.56%	7
People's Alliance (SLFP et al.)	2,085	25.41%	2
Janatha Vimukthi Peramuna	649	7.91%	0
New Left Front	10	0.12%	0
Valid Votes	8,206	100.00%	9
Rejected Votes	306		
Total Polled	8,512		
Registered Electors	12,063		
Turnout	70.56%		

The following candidates were elected: Amarasena Ilangamge (UNP), 4,868 preference votes (pv); Aththudawa Liyanaarachchige Gamini Nadeelal Gunawardhana (UNP), 3,506 pv; Amarawansha Wadumesthrige (UNP), 1,419 pv; Galmangoda Guruge Bandula Jayantha (UNP), 1,213 pv; Jayaneththi Arachchi Berty (UNP), 1,212 pv; I. D. Chulachandra (PA), 1,063 pv; K. M. Saman Indika Morayas (PA), 917 pv; Ariyapala Rammuthupura (UNP), 879 pv; and Vidanage Piyasena Kumaranayaka (UNP); 660 pv.

Amarasena Ilangamge (UNP) and Aththudawa Liyanaarachchige Gamini Nadeelal Gunawardhana (UNP) were appointed chairman and deputy chairman respectively.

=== 2006 local government election ===
Results of the local government election held on 30 March 2006:

Alliances and parties	Votes	%	Seats
United People's Freedom Alliance (SLFP et al.)	4,298	48.72%	5
United National Party	3,268	37.04%	3
Janatha Vimukthi Peramuna	1,239	14.04%	1
National Development Front	17	0.19%	0
Valid Votes	8,822	100.00%	9
Rejected Votes	250		
Total Polled	9,072		
Registered Electors	12,641		
Turnout	71.77%		

The following candidates were elected: Ilandarideva Chulachandra (UPFA); Ambalangodage Sarath Deshapriya (UPFA); Galbokka Hewage Sudarman De Silva (UPFA); Abesundara Wickramasooriya Boosabaduge Nishantha Manjula Fernando (UNP); Aththudawa Liyana Arachchige Gamini Nadilal Gunawardana (UNP); Clor Muhandiramge Saman Indika Morayas (UPFA); Galmangoda Guruge Wimalananda Sumanasooriya (UPFA); I. P. Wijaya Weerasooriya (JVP); and Ediriweera Arachchige Shantha Wickramasekara (UNP).

Ambalangodage Sarath Deshapriya (UPFA) and Clor Muhandiramge Saman Indika Morayas (UPFA) were appointed chairman and deputy chairman respectively.

The term of the council was due to expire in 2010 but on 22 December 2009 Minister of Local Government and Provincial Councils Janaka Bandara Tennakoon extended it until 31 March 2011.

=== 2011 local government election ===
Results of the local government election held on 17 March 2011:

Alliances and parties	Votes	%	Seats
United People's Freedom Alliance (SLFP et al.)	5,649	56.46%	6
United National Party	4,159	41.57%	3
Janatha Vimukthi Peramuna	195	1.95%	0
Independent 2	2	0.02%	0
Independent 1	1	0.01%	0
Valid Votes	10,006	100.00%	9
Rejected Votes	229		
Total Polled	10,235		
Registered Electors	13,523		
Turnout	75.69%		

The following candidates were elected: Ambalangodage Sarath Deshappriya (UPFA); Abeysundara Wikramasooriya Boosabaduge Nishantha Manjula Fernando (UNP); Kalthotage Kelum Kumara Fernando (UPFA); Indika Naleen Jayavikrama (UPFA); Dulip Lal Kumanayaka (UPFA); Clormuhandiram Saman Indika Morayas (UPFA); Manjula Sri Ilangamge (UNP); Manodara Aacharige Chaminda Sugath (UPFA); and Ediriwera Arachchige Shantha Wikkramasekara (UNP).

Indika Naleen Jayavikrama (UPFA) and Manodara Aacharige Chaminda Sugath (UPFA) were appointed chairman and deputy chairman respectively.
