= Thirukkovil =

Thirukkovil திருக்கோவில் තිරුක්කෝවිල්
- Village
- Location within Sri Lanka
- Coordinates: 7°08′0″N 81°51′0″E
- Country: Sri Lanka
- Province: Eastern
- District: Ampara
- DS Division: Thirukkovi

Thirukkovil or Tirukovil is a town in the Ampara District of Sri Lanka, situated along the eastern coast of the island. It is 30 km (19 mi) north of Pottuvil and 35 km (22 mi) south of Kalmunai. In Tamil the name translates to God's-temple. It was affected by 2004 Indian Ocean tsunami.

It was previously located with the Batticaloa District but now falls within the Ampara District. It is recognised for its traditional Tamil culture and temples. There is a Murugan temple: Shri Sithira Velayutha Suvamy Kovil. The schools include, Thambiluvil National College, Thirukkovil MMTMV and Vinayagapuram Maha Vidyalayam

Thirukkovil was severely affected by the tsunami of 26 December 2004. Because of the tsunami, many people lost their relatives and properties including houses, livestock and paddy fields. The population is slowly returning to its normal life with the help of the aid from government and NGOs.

== See also ==
- Thirukkovil Sithira Velayutha Swami Kovil
