= Kalmunai (Tamil) Divisional Secretary's Division =

Divisional Secretariat Kalmunai Sub Office
- Divisional Secretariat
- Country: Sri Lanka
- Province: Eastern Province
- District: Ampara District
- Time zone: UTC+5:30 (Sri Lanka Standard Time)

Kalmunai Sub Divisional Secretariat is a Divisional Secretariat of Ampara District, of Eastern Province, Sri Lanka.

== Demography-Religion ==
Religion in Kalmunai Tamil DS Division (2012)
1. Buddhist (0.60%)
2. Hindu (80.7%)
3. Muslim (8.00%)
4. Roman Catholic (6.30%)
5. Other Christian (4.30%)
6. Other (0.00%)
