= Akkaraipattu =

Akkaraipattu அக்கரைப்பற்று අක්කරපත්තුව
- Town
- Location within Sri Lanka
- Coordinates: 7°13′0″N 81°51′0″E
- Country: Sri Lanka
- Province: Eastern
- District: Ampara
- DS Division: Akkaraipattu Division
- Akkaraipattu Municipal Council: 1 April 2011

Government
  - Type: Mayor-Council
  - Body: Akkaraipattu Municipal Council
  - Mayor: Athaullah (NC)
  - Deputy Mayor: Muhammed Casim Muhammed Yasir (NC)

Area
  - Town: 60.00 km^{2} (23.17 sq mi)
  - Urban: 7.00 km^{2} (2.70 sq mi)

Population (2012),
  - Town: 39,166 (ADS Area)
  - Density: 652.8/km^{2} (1,691/sq mi)
  - Urban: 30,934 (AMC Area)
  - Urban density: 4,419/km^{2} (11,450/sq mi)
- Demonym: Akkaralites

Akkaraipattu (Tamil: அக்கரைப்பற்று, romanized: Akkaraippaṟṟu, Sinhala: අක්කරපත්තුව, romanized: Akkarapattuwa) is a large town in the Ampara District, Eastern Province, Sri Lanka. The town is strategically located with links via the Siyambalanduwa-Ampara Road (A25) and the Colombo-Batticaloa highway (A4). Akkaraipattu is situated 441 km (274 mi) from Colombo.

== History ==
During the period of British rule, Akkaraipattu was within the Batticaloa District. A Government Agent headed each district. The posts of Maniyakkara (Assistant Government Agent) and Vanniyanar (Additional Government Agent) reported to the Government Agent.. The Vanniyanar appointed two officers directly responsible for irrigation, development, and education. Under this structure, agriculture and road construction became a prominent part of the development of the Akkaraipattu area. The Vanniyanar was also responsible for appointing the chairman and members of local government organizations who would then conduct the functions of a local council including collecting taxes, civic construction, and maintaining law and order. The construction of the Gal Oya scheme, which commenced in 1949 and continues to be improved upon, further established agriculture—particularly paddy and sugar cane—as a driving economic force. Road development also continued in parallel with the development of land for agriculture. The Urban Development Area of Akkaraipattu includes Akkaraipattu Municipal Council and includes 23 Grama Niladhari Divisions (GND) of Akkaraipattu Municipal Council and five GNDs from the Pradeshiya Sabha area. (A GND is the smallest administrative unit in government.)

== Geography ==
The town is located just south of the centre of the eastern coastline and can be found through the Siyambalanduwa - Damana - Ampara Road (A25) and the Colombo-Ratnapura-Wellawaya-Batticaloa Road (A4). Akkaraipattu covers an area of 48.36 km^{2} (18.67 sq mi). The Urban Development Area of Akkaraipattu includes Akkaraipattu Municipal Council which covers 5.07 km^{2} (1.96 sq mi).

=== Topography ===
The terrain of Akkaraipattu area rises from sea level to 39 m (128 ft) above sea level. The terrain has large areas that are generally level and covered with agriculture. Settlements are scattered throughout the area.

=== Soil types ===
The susceptibility of soil types to drought is a major concern in Akkaraipattu. The three main soil types in this area are: alluvial soil which has variable drainage and texture, reddish-brown soil, and Solonetz soil. The alluvial soil is generally found on flat flood plains. Poorly drained alluvial soil is grey in colour whilst soil with better drainage is coloured brown to yellowish brown. The reddish brown soil has a reddish-brown surface colour when dry and turns to a dark reddish-brown colour when wet. Solonetz soil is not a fertile soil because it has a pH value greater than 8.5.

=== Hydrology ===
Akkaraipattu has three major water tanks: Ilukkuchchenai Tank, Neethai Tank, and Thillai Aru. These tanks, combined with water catchment systems, assist in supporting the paddy cultivation in the area.

=== Climate ===
Akkaraipattu is located in the dry zone of Sri Lanka. The northeast monsoon period (October–February) has the highest monthly rainfall. Conversely, the dry season months of June, July, and August have the lowest rainfall. The seasonal rain provides for the cultivation of crops during the maha season. The average annual rainfall is 119 mm (4.7 in). The lowest number of thundering days are recorded during the months of January and February whilst the highest number of days are recorded in September and October, prior to the commencement of the monsoon season.

Akkaraipattu

Climate chart (precipitation, max. and min. temperature)
J	F	M	A	M	J	J	A	S	O	N	D
300 26 17	140 26 19	50 27 19	65 29 19	20 31 20	10 31 21	10 30 21	20 30 21	25 30 19	95 29 19	320 27 19	345 27 20
- █ Average max. and min. temperatures in °C
- █ Precipitation totals in mm
- Source: File:Akkaraipattu Weather.JPG
Imperial conversion
J	F	M	A	M	J	J	A	S	O	N	D
12 78 63	5.5 78 65	2 81 67	2.6 84 66	0.8 88 68	0.4 88 69	0.4 86 70	0.8 87 70	1 86 67	3.7 84 66	13 81 67	14 80 67
- █ Average max. and min. temperatures in °F
- █ Precipitation totals in inches

An AusAID/UN-Habitat analysis of temperature records for the years 1950–2010 reports that the highest temperatures are experienced in May, June, and July (around 34 °C [93.2 °F]). The lowest temperatures are recorded in the months of January and December (around 23 °C [73.4 °F]). The mean annual temperature is 30 °C (86.0 °F).

== Demographics ==
Akkaraipattu urban area is dominated by Muslims. There are also Buddhist, Hindus and Christian minorities living in the town. The majority of people in Akkaraipattu speak Tamil, with Sinhala also spoken.

=== Religion ===
Religion in Akkaraipattu (2012)
Population	Percent
Islam	45.00%
Buddhism	0.25%
Hinduism	50.00%
Christianity	4.75%

Source:statistics.gov.lk

== Education ==
- Aalayadivaembu Tamil School
- Akkaraipattu Muslim Central College
- Ak/Sri Dhammarathanana Sinhala Vidyalaya
- Al-Badur School
- Al-Fathimiya School
- Al-Hidaya School
- Al-Kamar Vidyalaya
- Al-Munawwara College
- Ar-Raheemiya School
- As-Siraj Maha Viddiyalaya
- Ayesha Muslim Ladies College
- Dr. Badi Ud Din Mahmud School
- Fayiza Maha Vidayalayam
- Govt. Muslim Boys Vidyalaya (GMBV)
- Hijra School
- Ilukkuchenai Al-Hudha Vidyalaya
- Kathiriya Vidyalaya
- Kolaavil Tamil Vidyalaya
- Murawodai Shamsul Uloom Vidyala
- RKM Tamil Vidyalaya
- Segu Sikkanthar Oliullah Vidyalaya
- Sri Rama krishna National College Tamil
- Sir Razeek Fareed Vidyalaya
- Vivekananthair Tamil Vidyalaya
- Zahira Vidyalaya.

== Economy ==
Akkaraipattu acts as an agro-economic hub. Vast extents of Paddy field surround the township.
