= Mattakallappu Manmiyam =

Mattakkalappu Maanmiyam
- Mattakallappu Manmiyam cover page
- Author: F. X. Nadarajah
- Original title: மட்டக்களப்பு மான்மியம்
- Language: Tamil
- Genre: History
- Publisher: Batticaloa District Cultural Board
- Publication date: 1962
- Publication place: Sri Lanka
- Pages: XII + 128 + 9

Mattakkalappu Maanmiyam (Tamil: மட்டக்களப்பு மான்மியம்; The Glory of Batticaloa) is a Tamil language historical book concerning the history of Batticaloa. It was compiled by F. X. Nadarajah from the collections of palm-leaf manuscripts, copper plate inscriptions and inscriptions and it was published in August 1962. The authors of the original manuscripts and other forms of documentation are unknown.

The book records the history from ancient Batticaloa to the Dutch colonial era. It gives information about such matters as the kings who ruled the Batticaloa, the caste system, and the temple system. Historians say that the book has perplexity and mythical story as it written by various authors in various durations. However, it is considered a rare and important book for understanding the history of Batticaloa.

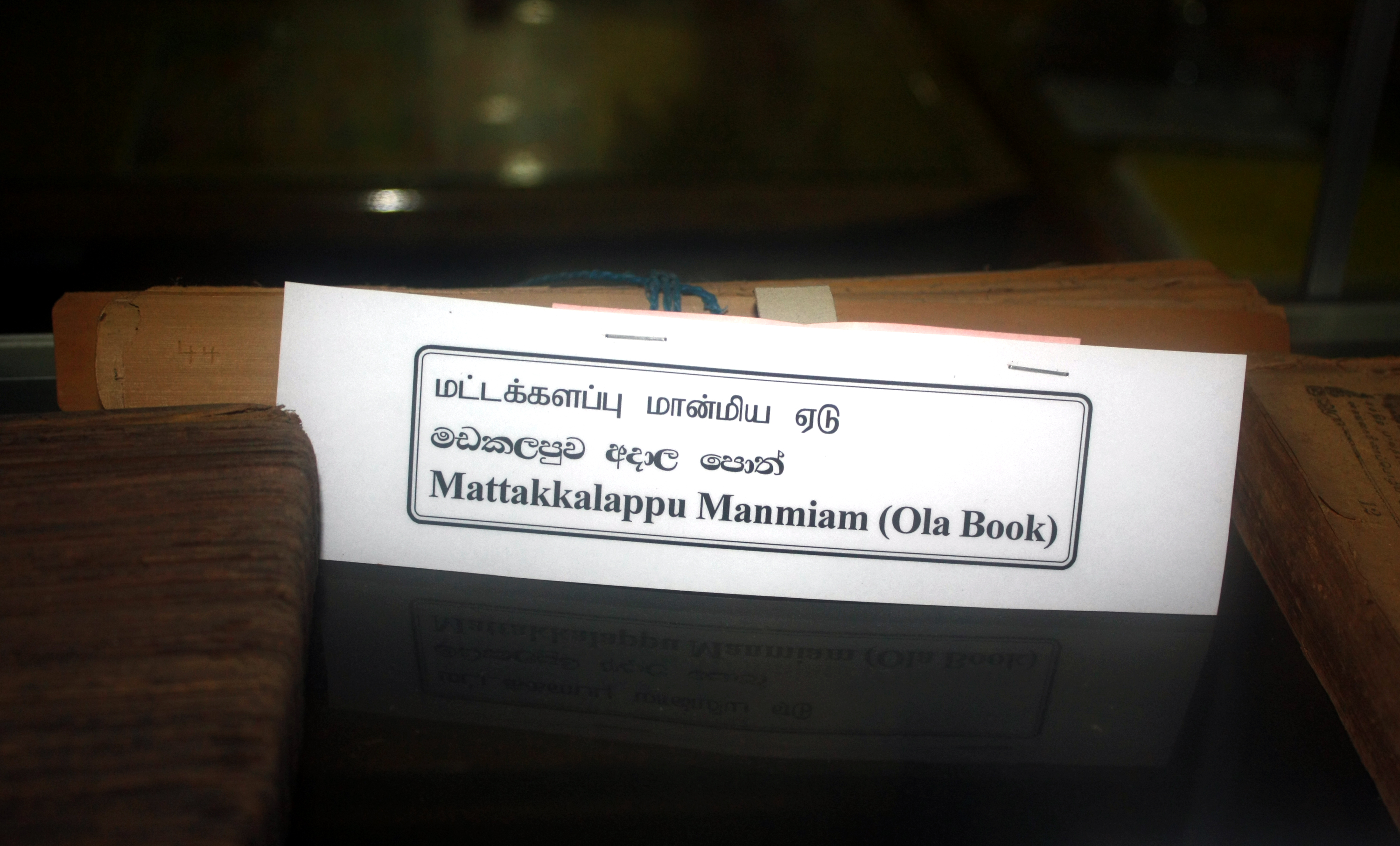
Palm-leaf manuscript of Mattakkalappu Maanmiyam at Batticaloa Museum

According to anthropologist Dennis B. McGilvray, the book records the only known ethnohistorical document that presents the lineage of the early rulers of the Batticaloa region. He notes that this 18th-century palm leaf record, called the Mattakkallappu Purva Carittiram, is "a bewildering list of royal names, events and social groups which has yet to be systematically corroborated and placed in the larger Sri Lankan historical context."
