= Ampara District =

Ampara District அம்பாறை மாவட்டம் අම්පාර දිස්ත්‍රික්කය
- Administrative District
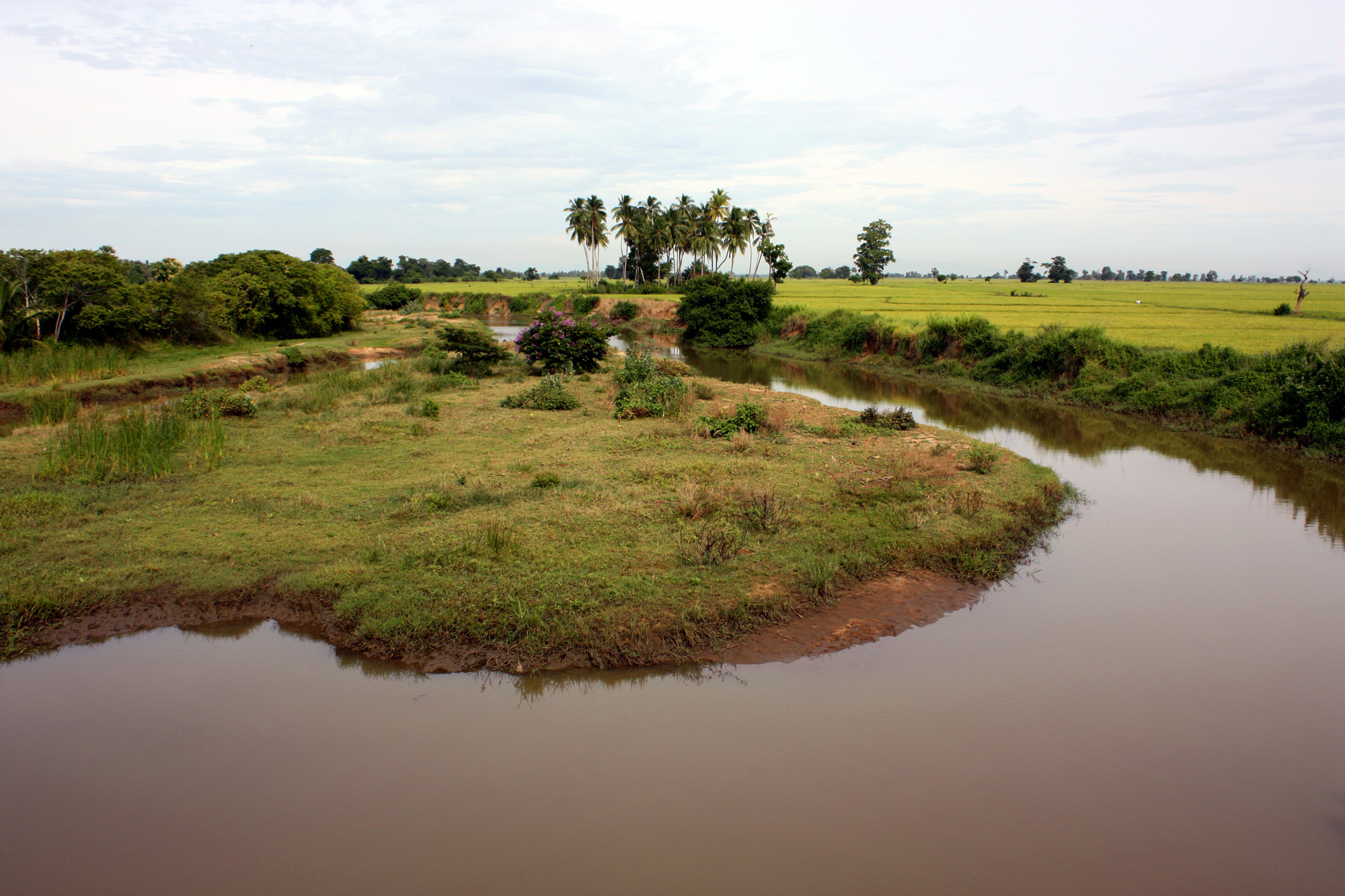
- Paddy field in Oluvil

- Location within Sri Lanka
- Coordinates: 07°05′N 81°45′E
- Country: Sri Lanka
- Province: Eastern
- Created: April 1961
- Capital: Ampara
- Largest City: Kalmunai
- DS Division: List: Addalaichchenai; Akkaraipattu; Alayadivembu; Ampara; Damana; Dehiattakandiya; Irakkamam; Kalmunai (Muslim); Kalmunai (Tamil); Karaitivu; Lahugala; Maha Oya; Navithanveli; Nintavur; Padiyathalawa; Pottuvil; Sainthamarathu; Samanthurai; Thirukkovil; Uhana

Government
  - District Secretary: D. M. L. Bandaranayake
  - MPs: List: A. L. M. Athaullah; P. Dayaratna; Cassim Faizal; H. M. M. Harees; Podiappuhamy Piyasena; Sarath Weerasekara; Sriyani Wijewickrama; S. M. M. Muszhaaraff

Area
  - Total: 4,415 km^{2} (1,705 sq mi)
  - Land: 4,222 km^{2} (1,630 sq mi)
  - Water: 193 km^{2} (75 sq mi) 4.37%
  - Rank: 4th (6.73% of total area)

Population (2024 census)
  - Total: 744,551
  - Rank: 14th (3.20% of total pop.)
  - Density: 176.4/km^{2} (456.7/sq mi)

Ethnicity (2012 census)
  - Moor: 282,484 (43.59%)
  - Sinhalese: 251,018 (38.73%)
  - Sri Lankan Tamil: 112,750 (17.40%)
  - Burgher: 849 (0.13%)
  - Other: 956 (0.15%)

Religion (2012 census)
  - Muslim: 282,746 (43.63%)
  - Buddhist: 250,213 (38.61%)
  - Hindu: 102,454 (15.81%)
  - Christian: 12,609 (1.95%)
  - Other: 35 (0.01%)
- Time zone: UTC+05:30 (Sri Lanka)
- Post Codes: 32000-32999
- Telephone Codes: 063, 067
- ISO 3166 code: LK-52
- Vehicle registration: EP
- Official Languages: Tamil, Sinhala
- Website: Ampara District Secretariat

Ampara District (Tamil: அம்பாறை மாவட்டம், romanized: Ampāṟai Māvaṭṭam; Sinhala: අම්පාර දිස්ත්‍රික්කය, romanized: Ampāra Distrikkaya) is one of the 25 districts of Sri Lanka, the second-level administrative divisions of the country. The district is administered by a District Secretariat headed by a District Secretary (previously known as a Government Agent) appointed by the central government of Sri Lanka. The capital of the district is the town of Ampara. The district was carved out of the southern part of Batticaloa District in April 1961.

== Geography ==
Ampara District is located in the south east of Sri Lanka in the Eastern Province. It has an area of 4,415 square kilometres (1,705 sq mi). It is bounded by Batticaloa and Polonnaruwa districts from north, Indian Ocean from east, Hambantota District from south, Badulla and Matale districts from northwest and by the Monaragala District from west and southeast.

The north-western panhandle of Ampara District (Dehiyattakandiya D.S. Division) is separated from the rest of the district and Eastern Province by the Maduru Oya Reservoir.

== Demographics ==
=== Population ===
Ampara District's population was 648,057 in 2012. The district is one of the most diverse in Sri Lanka, both ethnically and religiously.

The population of the district, like the rest of the east and north, was affected by the civil war. The war killed an estimated 100,000 people. Several hundred thousand Sinhalese move to west side of the country. Many Sri Lankan Tamils also moved to the relative safety of the capital Colombo. The war also caused many people from all ethnic and religious groups who lived in the district to flee to other parts of Sri Lanka, though most of them have returned to the district since the end of the civil war.

=== Ethnicity ===
Population of Ampara District by ethnic group 1963 to 2012
| Year | Sri Lankan Moor | | Sinhalese | | Sri Lankan Tamil | | Indian Tamil | | Other | | Total No. |
| Year | No. | % | No. | % | No. | % | No. | % | No. | % | Total No. |
|---|---|---|---|---|---|---|---|---|---|---|---|
| 1963 Census | 97,621 | 46.11% | 61,996 | 29.28% | 49,185 | 23.23% | 1,312 | 0.62% | 1,618 | 0.76% | 211,732 |
| 1971 Census | 126,365 | 46.35% | 82,280 | 30.18% | 60,519 | 22.20% | 1,771 | 0.65% | 1,670 | 0.61% | 272,605 |
| 1981 Census | 161,568 | 41.54% | 146,943 | 37.78% | 77,826 | 20.01% | 1,411 | 0.36% | 1,222 | 0.31% | 388,970 |
| 2001 Census | 244,620 | 41.25% | 236,583 | 39.90% | 109,188 | 18.41% | 715 | 0.12% | 1,891 | 0.32% | 592,997 |
| 2007 Enumeration | 268,630 | 43.99% | 228,938 | 37.49% | 111,948 | 18.33% | 58 | 0.01% | 1,145 | 0.19% | 610,719 |
| 2012 Census | 282,484 | 43.59% | 251,018 | 38.73% | 112,750 | 17.40% | 165 | 0.03% | 1,640 | 0.25% | 648,057 |

=== Religion ===
Population of Ampara District by religion 1981 to 2012
| Year | Islam | | Buddhist | | Hindu | | Christian (Note: Roman Catholic and Other Christian.) | | Others | | Total No. |
| Year | No. | % | No. | % | No. | % | No. | % | No. | % | Total No. |
|---|---|---|---|---|---|---|---|---|---|---|---|
| 1981 Census | 162,140 | 41.68% | 145,687 | 37.45% | 72,809 | 18.72% | 8,030 | 2.06% | 304 | 0.08% | 388,970 |
| 2001 Census | 245,179 | 41.35% | 235,652 | 39.74% | 100,213 | 16.90% | 11,785 | 1.99% | 168 | 0.03% | 592,997 |
| 2012 Census | 282,746 | 43.63% | 250,213 | 38.61% | 102,454 | 15.81% | 12,609 | 1.95% | 35 | 0.01% | 648,057 |

== Politics and government ==
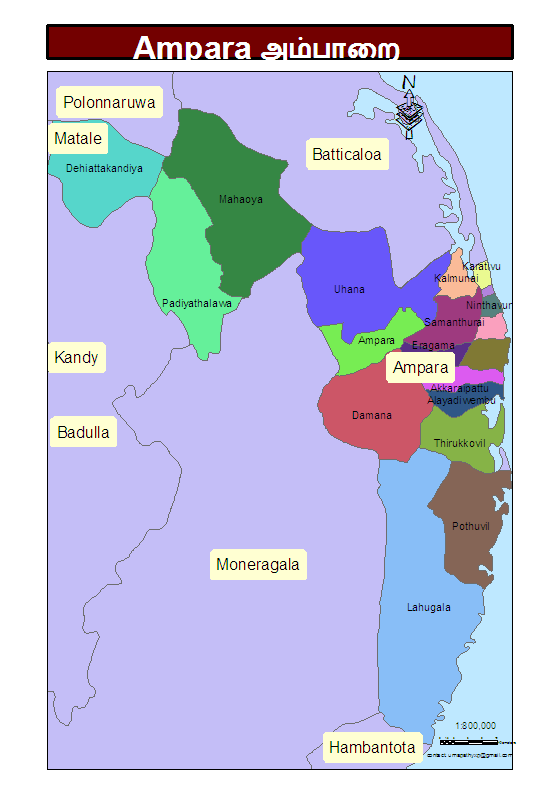
Administrative units of Ampara District in 2006

=== Local government ===
Ampara District has 20 local authorities of which two are Municipal Councils, one is an Urban Council and the remaining 17 are Divisional Councils (Pradesha Sabhai or Pradeshiya Sabha).

| Local Authority | Area | Population | Registered Electors (2011) | Elected Members (2011) | | | | | |
| Local Authority | Area | Population | Registered Electors (2011) | UPFA (Note: Includes National Congress.) | SLMC | UNP | TNA | Other | Total |
|---|---|---|---|---|---|---|---|---|---|
| Addalaichchenai Divisional Council | 94.50 | 43,499 | 25,510 | 2 | 7 | 0 | 0 | 0 | 9 |
| Akkaraipattu Divisional Council | 64.22 | 39,148 | 4,074 | 6 | 1 | 0 | 0 | 0 | 7 |
| Akkaraipattu Municipal Council | | | 20,971 | 8 | 1 | 0 | 0 | 0 | 9 |
| Alayadivembu Divisional Council | 129.20 | 26,175 | 15,358 | 2 | 0 | 0 | 5 | 2 | 9 |
| Ampara Urban Council | | | 13,523 | 6 | 0 | 3 | 0 | 0 | 9 |
| Damana Divisional Council | | | 23,899 | 7 | 0 | 2 | 0 | 0 | 9 |
| Dehiattakandiya Divisional Council | | | 40,099 | 12 | 0 | 7 | 0 | 2 | 21 |
| Irakkamam Divisional Council | | | 8,185 | 2 | 5 | 0 | 0 | 0 | 7 |
| Kalmunai Municipal Council | 22.80 | 100,427 | 68,198 | 3 | 11 | 1 | 4 | 0 | 19 |
| Karaitivu Divisional Council | 8.60 | 18,435 | 12,044 | 0 | 1 | 0 | 4 | 0 | 5 |
| Lahugala Divisional Council | | | 5,861 | 4 | 0 | 7 | 0 | 0 | 11 |
| Maha Oya Divisional Council | 697.80 | 17,801 | 12,607 | 7 | 0 | 3 | 0 | 0 | 10 |
| Namal Oya Divisional Council | 105.10 | | 16,715 | 6 | 0 | 3 | 0 | 0 | 9 |
| Navithanveli Divisional Council | | | 12,799 | 1 | 1 | 0 | 4 | 1 | 7 |
| Nintavur Divisional Council | 42.90 | 28,247 | 19,124 | 1 | 6 | 0 | 0 | 0 | 7 |
| Padiyatalawa Divisional Council | | | 11,686 | 7 | 0 | 3 | 0 | 1 | 11 |
| Pottuvil Divisional Council | 269.00 | 31,995 | 21,398 | 2 | 6 | 0 | 1 | 0 | 9 |
| Sammanthurai Divisional Council | 198.40 | 75,257 | 37,469 | 5 | 3 | 1 | 0 | 0 | 9 |
| Thirukkovil Divisional Council | 212.12 | 29,860 | 18,076 | 1 | 0 | 1 | 7 | 0 | 9 |
| Uhana Divisional Council | 415.00 | 60,071 | 40,694 | 9 | 0 | 5 | 0 | 1 | 15 |
| Total | | | 428,290 | 91 | 42 | 36 | 25 | 7 | 201 |

== Administrative units ==
Ampara District is divided into 20 Divisional Secretary's Division (DS Divisions), each headed by a Divisional Secretary (previously known as an Assistant Government Agent). The DS Divisions are further sub-divided into 507 Grama Niladhari Divisions (GN Divisions).

| DS Division | Main Town | Divisional Secretary | GN Divisions | Area (km^{2}) | Population (2012 Census) | | | | | | Population Density (/km^{2}) |
| DS Division | Main Town | Divisional Secretary | GN Divisions | Area (km^{2}) | Sri Lankan Moors | Sinhalese | Sri Lankan Tamil | Burgher | Other | Total | Population Density (/km^{2}) |
|---|---|---|---|---|---|---|---|---|---|---|---|
| Addalaichchenai | Addalaichchenai | I. M. Haniffa | 32 | 62 | 38,948 | 2,218 | 942 | 30 | 27 | 42,165 | |
| Akkaraipattu | Akkaraipattu | M. Y. Saleem | 28 | 60 | 39,016 | 165 | 35 | 7 | 0 | 39,223 | |
| Alayadivembu | Alayadivembu | V. Jahadeesan | 22 | 90 | 22 | 228 | 22,014 | 129 | 18 | 22,411 | |
| Ampara (Namal Oya) | Ampara | M. M. S. K. Bandara Mapa | 22 | 174 | 133 | 43,177 | 172 | 45 | 193 | 43,720 | |
| Damana | Damana | S. K. Kulathunga Mudali | 33 | 542 | 137 | 38,302 | 28 | 5 | 17 | 38,489 | |
| Dehiattakandiya | Dehiattakandiya | W. G. M.Hemantha Kumara | 14 | 394 | 108 | 58,948 | 67 | 0 | 505 | 59,628 | |
| Irakkamam (Eragama) | Irakkamam | M. M. Nazeer | 12 | | 13,084 | 938 | 350 | 0 | 1 | 14,373 | |
| Kalmunai (Muslim) | Kalmunai | J. Likayath Ali | 28 | 22 | 44,306 | 124 | 66 | 1 | 12 | 44,509 | |
| Kalmunai (Tamil) | Kalmunai | K. Lavanathan | 29 | | 2,376 | 231 | 26,564 | 490 | 52 | 29,713 | |
| Karaitivu | Karaitivu | S. Jegarajan | 17 | 7 | 6,753 | 13 | 9,891 | 123 | 1 | 16,781 | |
| Lahugala | Lahugala | L. A. Somarathna | 12 | 815 | 1 | 8,253 | 645 | 0 | 1 | 8,900 | |
| Maha Oya | Maha Oya | A. M. Wickramarachchi | 17 | 667 | 42 | 20,655 | 15 | 2 | 1 | 20,715 | |
| Navithanveli | Navithanveli | S. Garan | 20 | | 6,399 | 153 | 12,101 | 9 | 10 | 18,672 | |
| Nintavur | Nintavur | R U. Abdul Jaleel | 25 | 35 | 25,347 | 8 | 969 | 2 | 3 | 26,329 | |
| Padiyathalawa | Padiyathalawa | K. G. S. Nishantha | 20 | 379 | 87 | 18,091 | 28 | 0 | 3 | 18,209 | |
| Pottuvil | Pottuvil | M. I. M. Thawfieek | 27 | 265 | 27,213 | 881 | 6,581 | 3 | 71 | 34,749 | |
| Sainthamaruthu | Sainthamaruthu | A. L. Mohamed Saleem | 17 | 6 | 25,389 | 5 | 17 | 0 | 1 | 25,412 | |
| Sammanthurai | Sammanthurai | A. Mansoor | 51 | 229 | 53,114 | 297 | 7,178 | 1 | 6 | 60,596 | |
| Thirukkovil | Thirukkovil | M. Gopakaretnam | 22 | 184 | 2 | 100 | 25,055 | 1 | 29 | 25,187 | |
| Uhana | Uhana | U. P. Indika Anurudda Piyadasa | 59 | 485 | 7 | 58,231 | 32 | 1 | 5 | 58,276 | |
| Total | | | 507 | 4,415 | 282,484 | 251,018 | 112,750 | 849 | 956 | 648,057 | 147 |
