= Ukanthamalai Murugan Kovil =

Ancient Hindu temple

Ukanthai Murugan Kovil
- உகந்தமலை ஸ்ரீ முருகன் ஆலயம்
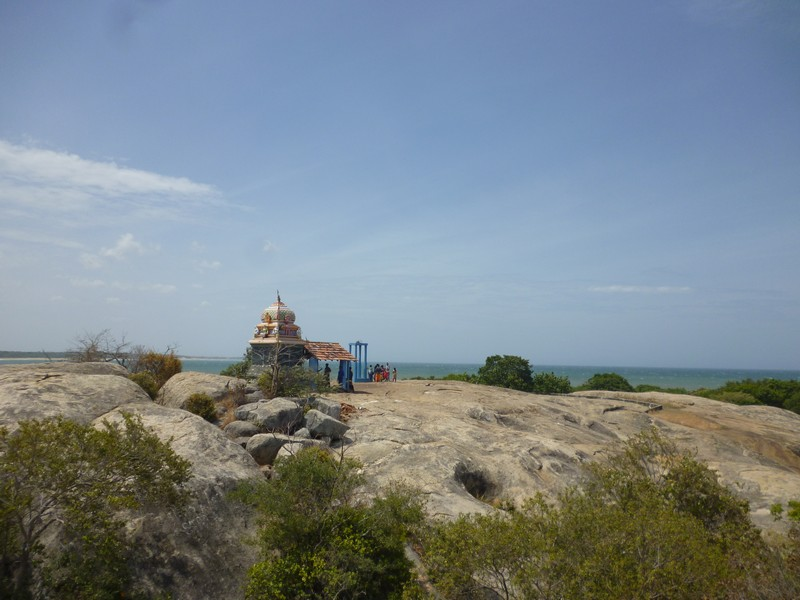
- View of Valli Amman Kovil from Swamimalai

- Location in Sri Lanka

Religion
- Affiliation: Hinduism
- District: Ampara

Location
- State: Eastern
- Country: Sri Lanka
- Interactive map of Ukanthai Murugan Kovil
- Coordinates: 6°39′0″N 81°46′0″E

Architecture
- Archaeological Protected Monument of Sri Lanka
- Official name: Rock with archaeological evidences of Buddhist monks' meditation cave monastery complex at Okanda Dewalaya premises
- Type: Dripledged Caves
- Designated: 10 October 2014

Ukanthamalai Murugan Kovil (also known as Okanda Kuda Kataragama Devalaya, Okanda Devalaya) (Tamil: உகந்தமலை முருகன் ஆலயம், Sinhala: ඔකඳ කතරගම දේවාලය) is the well known Hindu temple situated in the Okanda, Ampara District of Eastern Sri Lanka, about 145 km south of Batticaloa town. This alluring temple dedicated to Lord Murugan in the heart of Kumana forest is a main stand for the devotees performing pilgrimage to Katirkamam through dense jungle. In places like Pânama and Kumana, which are close to Ukantai, Tamils and Sinhalese lived in harmony even down to the present day.

== Folklore ==
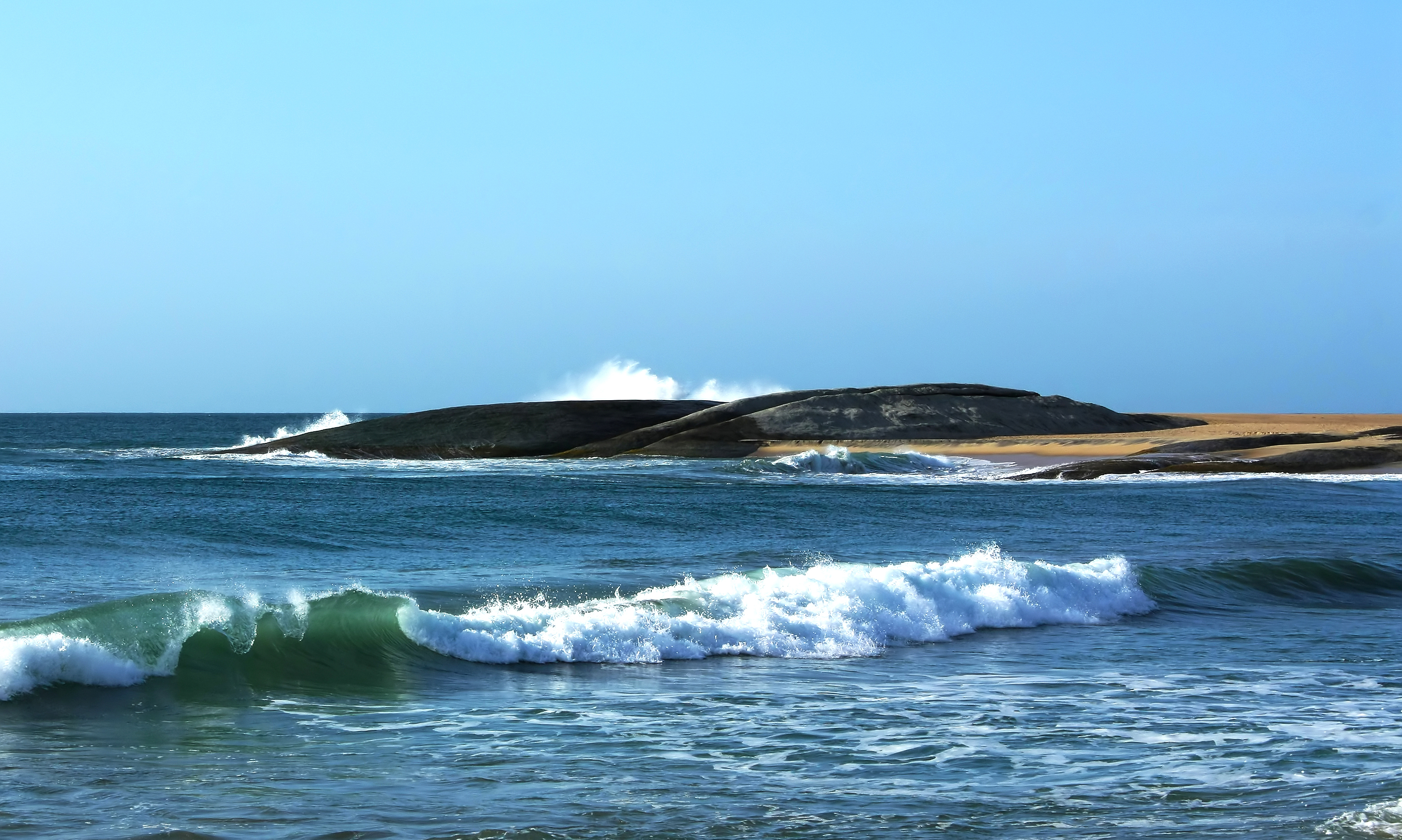
Golden boat turned into a rock, Okanda beach, Yala East.

Since Lord Murugan is always linked with mountains, Some Tamil folklore tell that ukanthamalai got its name as it is the most "ukantha" (உகந்த, litt. "congenial") place of Lord Murugan. According to another folklore this place is believed to be the location where Skanda Kumara landed on the shore of Okanda with Valli Amma in a golden boat. The boat is said to be turned into a rock known as the "Ran Oru Gala" which still visible on the Okanda beach.

== History ==
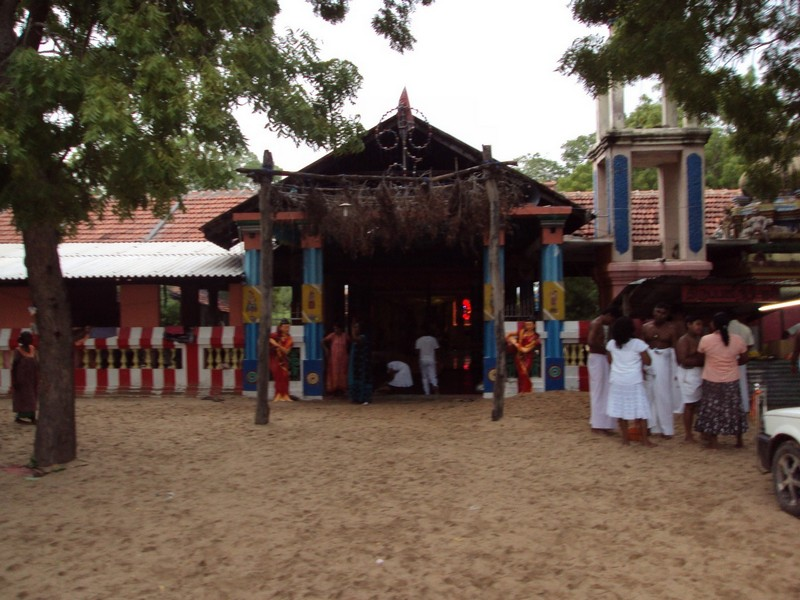
Temple of Lord Murugan in Ukanthamai.

So many folklores bring the antiquity of Ukanthai Temple to Katirkamam. It attracted the Katirkamam pilgrims from immemorial time. The top of the hillock has been cited as one of the places where a divine katir / Vel from Lord Skanda struck. Veddas preserved the sanctity of the place with a simple shrine of stick and ola leaves. According to another myth, the third spear from the hand of Lord Murugan reached here and came to rest on this hilltop, making it a favorite site for Murukan worship. There is yet a third myth according to which, Murugan and his sweet heart Valli arrived in stone boats (which still rest on the beach) to reside on top of the Ukanthai Malai.

There was a small hut made with loose stones for the "Vel" at the top of the hill from very long time. British diaries confirm that this was a notable Hindu shrine even in the 1800s. It is believed that, a Hindu sage named "Giri", from North India looked after this temple. A famous merchant from Jaffna "Markkandu Mudaliyar" lived in Batticaloa erected a small building for housing the Vel in 1885. "Muthiyanse Bandara Mahataya" from Panamai was appointed by him, as the "Vannakkar" (litt. Caretaker) of the temple along with the priest "Kaliyappan", from Kolavil village.

A pilgrims' rest was also built by Markkandu Mudaliyar which was burnt many years ago. Temple faced to its first "Kumbapishegam" (Baptism of Hindu temple) in 1908 followed by two other Kumbapishegams in 2002 and 2014.

== Temple structure ==
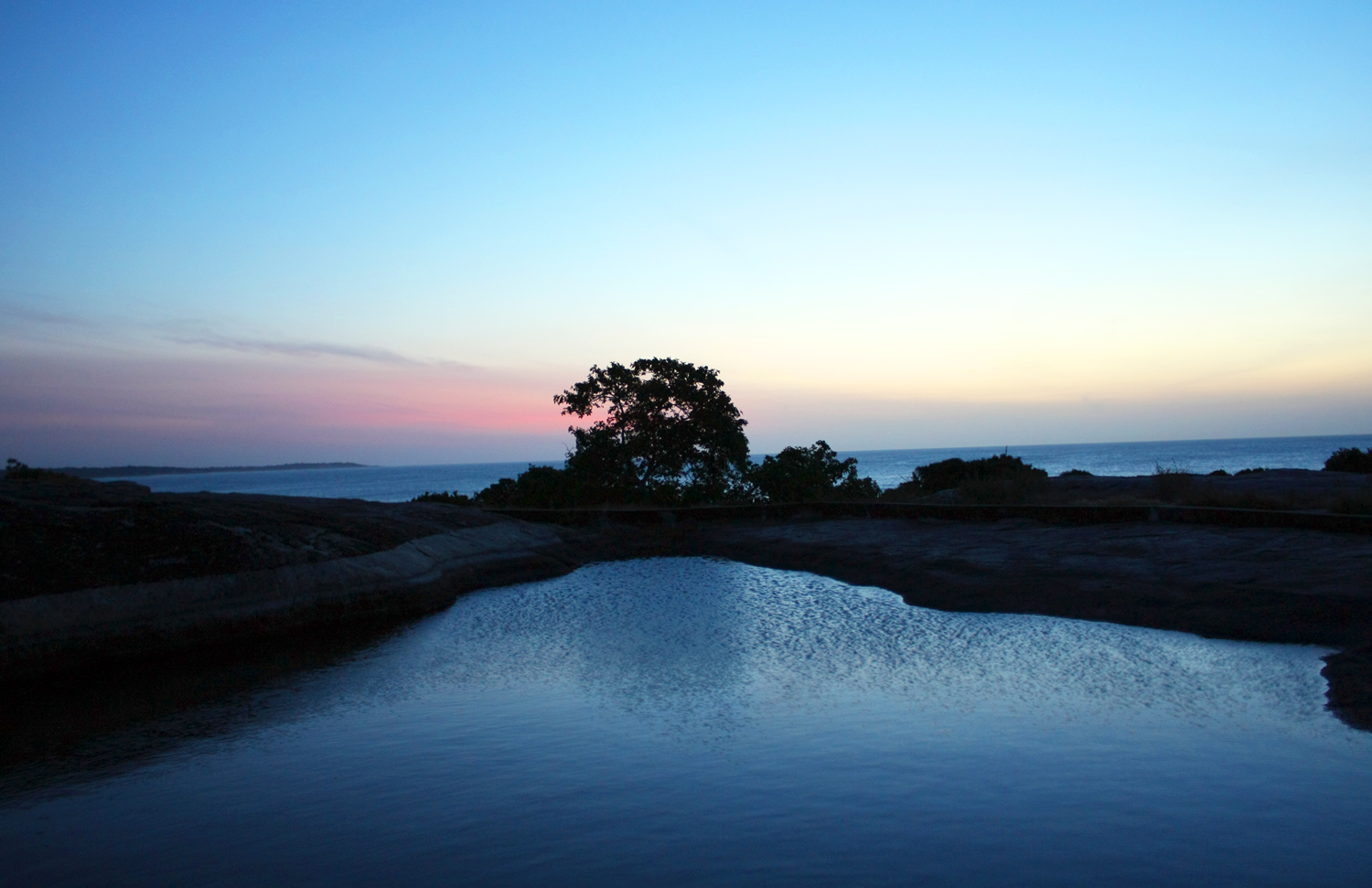
One of the Natural pond excavation in front of Valli Amman Kovil.

The main shrine of Lord Murugan is situated in the bottom of the Ukanthai with a majestic sanctum pagoda surrounded by small chapels dedicated to Pillaiyar, Naga Tambiran, Navagraham and Vairavar. The golden spear of Lord Murugan standing in the sanctum cannot be ever seen as the sanctum is always covered with a screen.

Ukanthai is divided into two hillocks called as Swamimalai and Vallimalai since they have two shrines for Velswami and Valli Amman at top of them respectively. Naturally formed seven excavations are in these two hillocks and the "Saravana poigai" - the natural spring in front of Valli Amman Kovil is esteemed by the devotees and they believe that this spring was formed by the "Vel" of Lord Murugan. In the bottom of the Swamimalai, there is another chapel for Pillaiyar.

Okanda Beach is about 100 m southwards of the main shrine of Murugan and there was a boat - like rock is situated in the shore which i.s already mentioned above. Another hillock near the beach called as "Kallu vacha Malai" (கல்லு வச்ச மலை - litt. "Stone placing mountain") is another place of worship where devotees place a "kallu" - stone with prayers for fulfilling their wishes. the naturally formed foot - like excavations are believed to belongs to Murugan and Valli.

== Annual Festival ==
Annual Festival of Ukanthai is simultaneously occurring with Katirkamam festival falling on mid July - August Full moon day. "Teerta Utsavam" (the final Sea bathing cult of festival) is carried out during Tiruvonam star of Hindu panchangam.

== See also ==
- Panama
- Okanda
- Katirkamam
