= Panama, Sri Lanka =

Panama පාණම, பாணமை
- Village
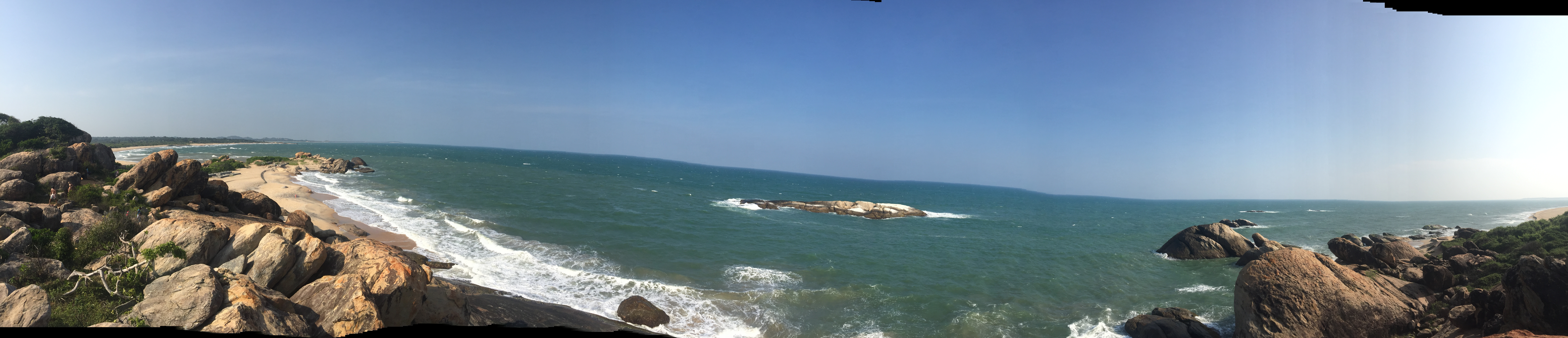

- Location within Sri Lanka
- Coordinates: 6°45′0″N 81°48′0″E
- Country: Sri Lanka
- Province: Eastern
- District: Ampara
- DS Division: Lahugala

Population (2012)
  - Total: 3,938

Ethnic groups
  - Sinhalese: 93.5%
  - Sri Lankan Tamils: 6.5%

Panama (Sinhala: පාණම, pāṇama, Tamil: பாணமை, pāṇamai) is a coastal village in the Eastern Province of Sri Lanka, located 126 kilometres (78 mi) south of Batticaloa and 12 km (7.5 mi) south of Arugam Bay. It is the last populated settlement in the southernmost part of the province, within the Ampara District. Kumana Bird Sanctuary and Heritage park starts southwards from Panama.

Panama was the capital of the Colonial Panamapattu of Mattakkalappu Desam. This ancient village can be seen in the historical maps of the Portuguese and the Dutch as Panao, Panova, and Paneme. Panama's inhabitants are predominantly Sinhalese, with a significant minority Sri Lankan Tamil population. Panama is known for its Pattini Cult.

The village's name has been a cause for mix-up by Sri Lanka Post resulting in local mail being wrongly redirected to the Central American nation of Panama and vice versa for international mail.

== See also ==
- Okanda
