= Arugam Bay =

Town in Eastern Province, Sri Lanka

Arugam Bay அறுகம் குடா ආරුගම් බොක්ක
- Town
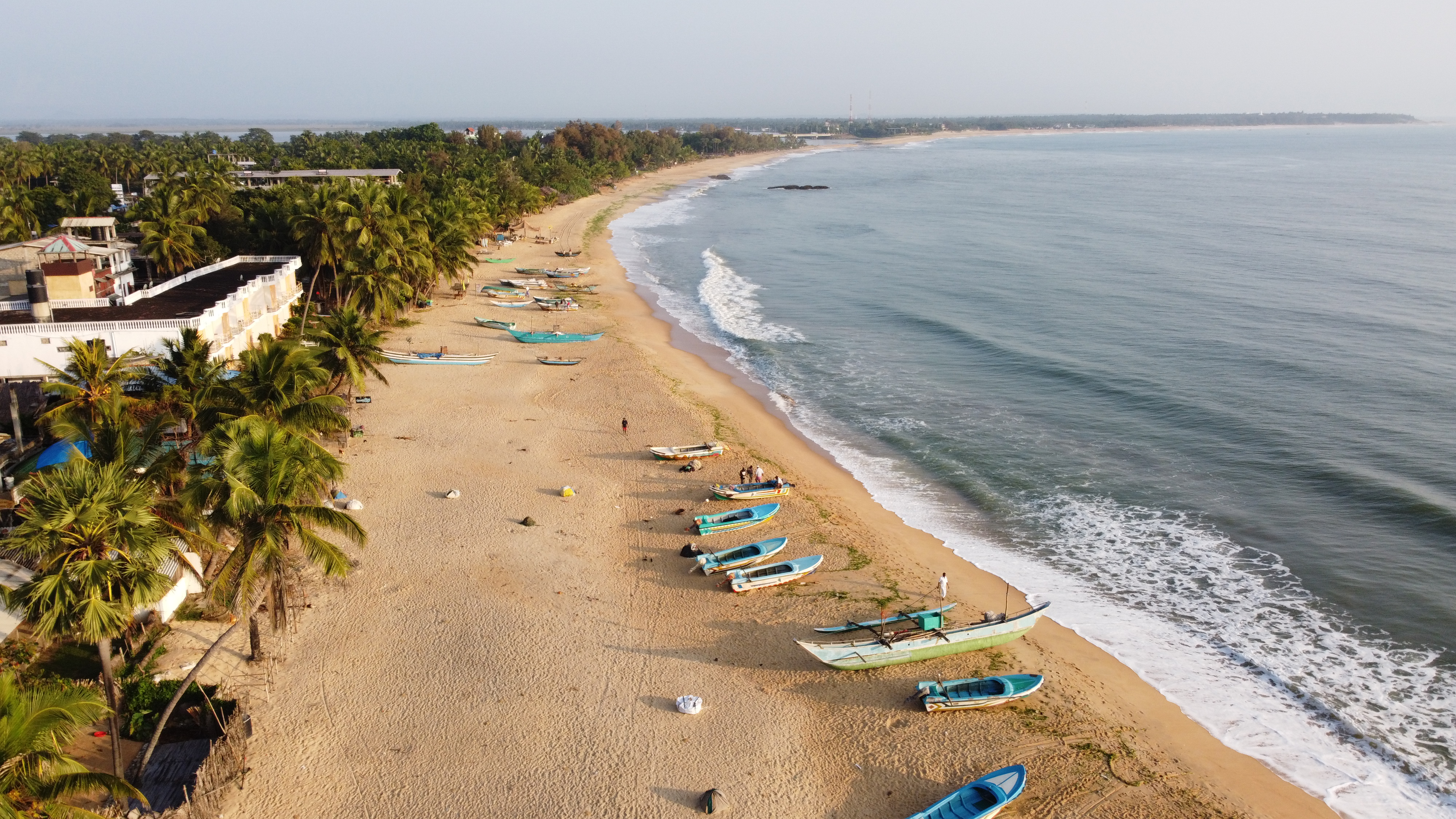
- Beach of Arugam Bay
- Nickname: Arugam Bokka
- Location within Sri Lanka
- Coordinates: 6°51′N 81°50′E
- Country: Sri Lanka
- Province: Eastern
- District: Ampara
- Secretariat: Pottuvil

Arugam Bay (Tamil: அறுகம் குடா, romanized: Aṟukam kuṭā; Sinhala: ආරුගම් බොක්ක, romanized: ārugam bokka), is situated on the Indian Ocean in the dry zone of Sri Lanka's southeast coast, and a historic settlement of the ancient Batticaloa Territory (Mattakallappu Desam).

== Geography ==
The bay is located 117 kilometres (73 mi) south of Batticaloa, 320 kilometres (200 mi) due east of Colombo, and approximately 4 kilometres (2.5 mi) south of the market town of Pottuvil.

The nearby (4 kilometres (2.5 mi)) Muslim village of Pottuvil is the centre of commerce and transportation while tourist accommodation lies along the beach to the south of Pottuvil. Arugam Bay (4 kilometres (2.5 mi)) is also the gateway and the only road access to the Yala East National Park. In 2.2 kilometres (1.4 mi) distance there is Pasarichenai Beach. This area is known as Kumana (44 kilometres (27 mi)), to be reached via the Tamil/Sinhalese settlement of Panama (Sri Lanka) (17 kilometres (11 mi)) and the Tamil shires at Okanda (32 kilometres (20 mi)). The local area is home to a number of elephants, often travelling between Lahugala and Kumana national parks.

== Demographics ==
The main settlement in the area, known locally as Ullae, is predominantly Muslim. There is also a significant Sri Lankan Tamil and Sinhala population in Arugam Bay.

== Economy ==
While fishing has traditionally dominated the local economy, tourism has grown rapidly in the area in recent years. Tourism in Arugam Bay is dominated by surf tourism, thanks to several quality breaks in the area; however, tourists are also attracted by the local beaches, lagoons, historic temples and the nearby Kumana National Park.

Much of the bay, as well as the neighbouring town of Pottuvil, were destroyed in the 2004 Tsunami.

=== Conflict between fishing and tourism ===
During the period of fighting between the central government and Tamil separatists tourism was fairly low key and the hotels often bought the catch of the fishermen. As a result of the peace, tourism expanded and many fishing people who had moved to areas less touched by the conflict returned. Hotel owners began to complain about the smell of drying fish and how the fishing huts blocked their view. In the aftermath of the Tsunami fishing people were forbidden to return, officially on the grounds of safety but allegedly as a result of pressure from the hotel owners.

=== Israeli tourism and businesses ===
Arugam Bay is a popular destination for Israeli tourists. Many eateries, spas and other retail outlets in the area display signs in Hebrew. Israeli tourists have set up a Chabad house in the area. 20,515 Israeli tourists visited Sri Lanka between January and August 2024.

On 23 October 2024, police increased security in Arugam Bay after being notified of a possible threat to Israeli tourists. Troops were deployed and police patrols were increased near the Chabad house. Israel's national security council warned Israelis living in the area to leave immediately and to avoid large gatherings. The US Embassy in Sri Lanka issued a travel warning for US citizens as well.

Israel's warning came after calls on social media to boycott Israeli businesses in the area, reportedly due to anger in the Muslim community at Israel's wars against Gaza and Hezbollah. Rehan Jayawickreme accused Israeli businesses of operating illegally in Sri Lanka and creating a "serious security threat that could derail Sri Lanka's tourism recovery efforts".

On 24 October, three Sri Lankans were arrested over threats against Israeli tourists.

== Surfing ==
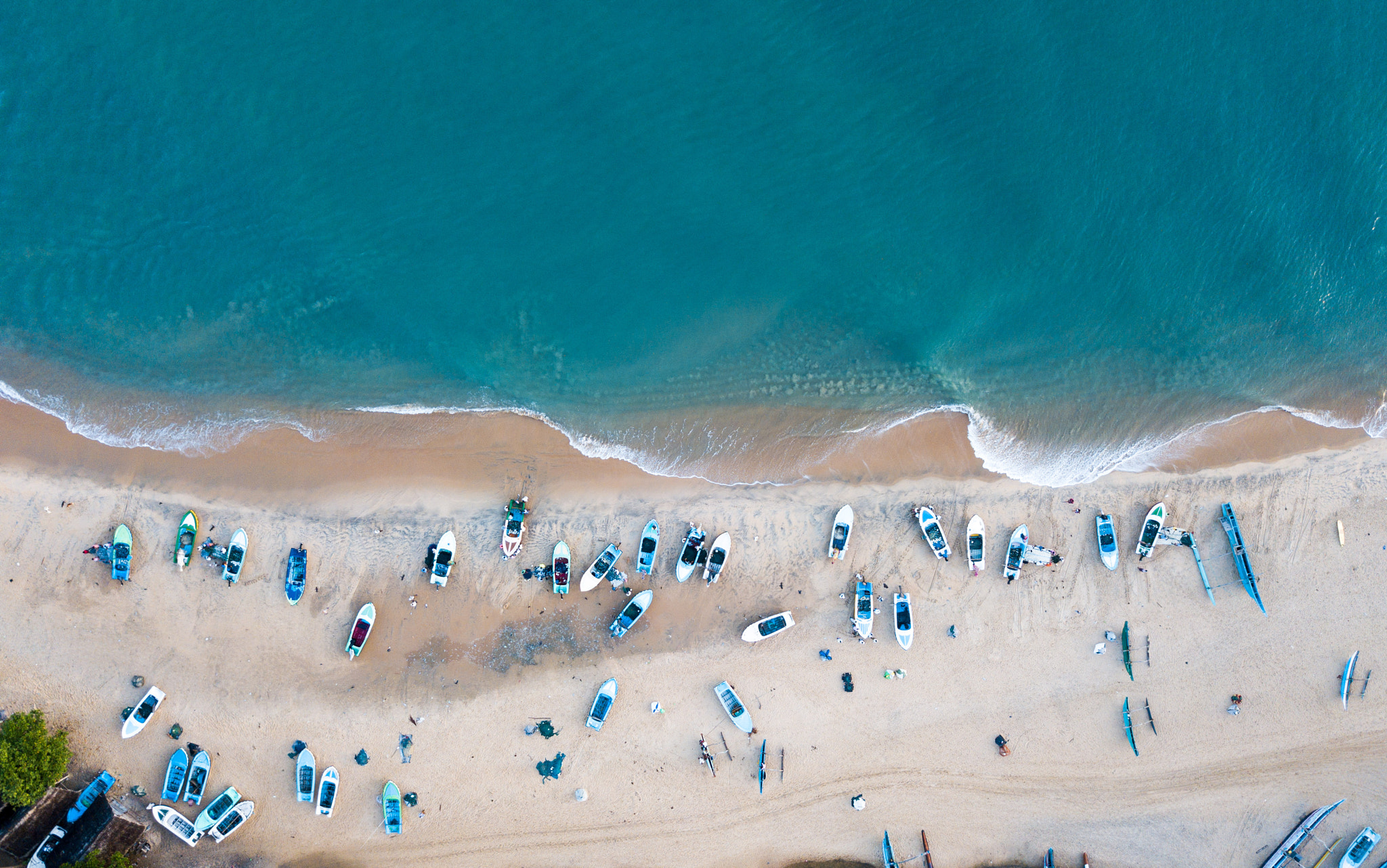
Arugam Bay is one of the most popular surf locations in Sri Lanka

Arugam Bay is a popular surfing location and is also the only international surf competition venue in Sri Lanka. It is also rated as one of the top ten surf destinations in the country, known as Ofek's main point. It has also hosted most of the international surfing competitions in Sri Lanka since 2004. It also hosted the So Sri Lanka Pro 2019.

In October 2018, the Arugam Bay Girls Surf Club registered with the Surfing Federation of Sri Lanka, making it Sri Lanka's first female surf club. As of October 2024, the club has 13 members, many of whom are certified instructors trained with support from the Australian government.
