= Mitch Parkinson =

Australian surfer (born 1997)

Personal information
- Born: 1997 (age 27–28)

Surfing career
- Sport: Surfing
- Best year: 1st – So Sri Lanka Pro 2019
- Sponsors: Billabong

Surfing specifications
- Stance: Natural (regular) foot

Mitch Parkinson (born 1997) is an Australian surfer who competes on the WSL (World Surf League) World Tour. On 29 September 2019, he won the So Sri Lanka Pro 2019 title as a part of the World Surf League defeating Indonesia's Oney Anwar in the final. It was also his first career WSL title. His cousin Joel Parkinson is also a professional surfer and a former world champion.

== Career ==
He took the sport of surfing at the age of 16 and competed at the international level from 2011. He finished fifth at the Gold Coast Open 2019 which was held in Australia. His best finish came at the So Sri Lanka Pro 2019 event, where he emerged as the winner of the tournament scoring a whopping 19.17 points. Following the tournament win, he jumped from 312th position to a career best 99th position in WSL world rankings.

WSL World Tour Wins
Year	Event	Venue	Country
2019	So Sri Lanka Pro	Arugam Bay	Sri Lanka
