= So Sri Lanka Pro 2019 =

Surfing competition

- Location: Arugam Bay, Sri Lanka
- Dates: 25 September–29 September
- Competitors: 124 from 24 nations
- Winning time: USD 2000

Medalists
gold medal	(Australia) Mitch Parkinson
silver medal	(Indonesia) Oney Anwar

The So Sri Lanka Pro 2019 was a surfing competition which was held as a part of the World Surfing League Qualifying Series 3000. This was the second edition of the Sri Lanka Pro League and it was also the first such event to be conducted since 2011 after 8 years. It was held from 25 September to 29 September in Arugam Bay coinciding the World Tourism Day on 27 September. The event featured 124 competitors from 24 nations including the retired former world champion Mark Occhilupo. The event was titled as So Sri Lanka which is also used as a slogan to promote tourism industry in Sri Lanka by the Sri Lanka Tourism Promotion Bureau from 2018. SriLankan Airlines is the official airline partner for the series.

So Sri Lanka Pro 2019 was hosted as a means of developing and promoting the tourism sector in Sri Lanka which was notably affected following the 2019 Easter attacks. The ground arrangements were prepared by Lanka Sportreizen and the event was officially launched on 4 September 2019. It was organized by Sri Lanka Tourism Promotion Bureau, Sri Lanka Surfing Federation in affiliation with World Surf League. Australia's Julian Wilson is the defending champion who won the tournament in 2011.

Australia's Mitch Parkinson won the tournament defeating Oney Anwar of Indonesia by scoring a whopping 19.17 with a lead of six points against his opponent in the final. The final was also the first matchup between these two in a WSL event and also marked Parkinson's first WSL career title victory.

== Competition ==
The competition featured 124 competitors from 24 nations. The tournament consists of five rounds followed by knockout stages. Round 1 consisting of eight heat events began and concluded on 25 September 2019, the first day of the five day competition. The round consisting of 16 heat events 2 began and concluded on 26 September 2019. Round 3 consisting of 16 heat events of the competition began on 27 September 2019 and concluded on 28 September. Round 4 and Round 5 each comprising 8 heat events began on 28 September and concluded on the same day. Quarterfinals, Semifinals and Final were all held on the final day of the event on 29 September 2019.

=== Seeding Round ===
==== Round 1 ====
Heat 1
1	Pedro Coelho	(Portugal)	11.84
2	Sachin Tharaka	(Sri Lanka)	6.63
3	Ajeesh Mohamed	(India)	5.87

Heat 2
1	Parasurman Kavinthiran	(Sri Lanka)	11.34
2	Yashika Shehan	(Sri Lanka)	7.97
3	Kavishka Deshan	(Sri Lanka)	6.07

Heat 3
1	Kian Martin	(Sweden)	12.10
2	Mohd Daud	(Malaysia)	8.00
3	Lesitha Prabath	(Sri Lanka)	7.80

Heat 4
1	Suranga Pradeep	(Sri Lanka)	9.73
2	Anra Milan	(Sri Lanka)	8.44
3	Imalka Madushanka	(Sri Lanka)	6.00

Heat 5
1	Clinton Gravett	(South Africa)	15.24
2	Nyoman Satria	(Indonesia)	12.06
3	Vignesh Kumar	(India)	5.37

Heat 6
1	Waduke Sanjey	(Sri Lanka)	8.50
2	Sanjay Selvmani	(India)	6.27
3	Subodha Hansaka	(India)	5.06

Heat 7
1	Mitch Parkinson	(Australia)	13.67
2	Muhammad Didaqt Musaddiq	(Malaysia)	6.27
3	Manikandan Desappan	(India)	5.06

Heat 8
1	Tipi Jabrik	(Indonesia)	8.50
2	Anushantha Andradasa	(Sri Lanka)	6.27
3	Pradeep Kumara	(Sri Lanka)	5.06

==== Round 2 ====
Heat 1
1	Noah Beschen Q	(Hawaii)	12.67
2	Kaiki Yamanaka Q	(Japan)	10.64
3	Maxime Dos Anjos E	(France)	9.90
4	Pedro Coelho E	(Portugal)	8.40

Heat 2
1	Rinta Oooto Q	(Japan)	13.33
2	Darcy Crump Q	(Australia)	10.30
3	Sachin Tharaka E	(Sri Lanka)	6.03

Heat 3
1	Lucas Wrice Q	(Australia)	13.94
2	Gaspard Larsonneur Q	(France)	11.40
3	Duke Nagtzaam E	(Australia)	8.16
4	Perceval Fayon E	(France)	7.34

Heat 4
1	Cooper Davies Q	(Australia)	13.76
2	Maddy Job Q	(Australia)	12.86
3	Chanu Anjan E	(Sri Lanka)	5.07
4	Parasurman Kavinthiran E	(Sri Lanka)	3.84

Heat 5
1	Francisco Bellorin Q	(Venezuela)	13.94
2	Kairi Noro Q	(Japan)	12.13
3	Kian Martin E	(Sweden)	10.43
4	Daniel Farr E	(New Zealand)	10.30

Heat 6
1	Dylan Moffat Q	(Australia)	11.27
2	Dean Vandewalle Q	(Belgium)	8.66
3	Shane Sykes E	(South Africa)	8.40
4	Mohd Daud E	(Malaysia)	3.30

Heat 7
1	Kai Tandler Q	(Australia)	13.93
2	Arnau Riera Q	(Spain)	8.56
3	Caina Souza E	(Brazil)	8.23
4	Suranga Pradeep E	(Sri Lanka)	4.27

Heat 8
1	Tomas King Q	(Costa Rica)	13.00
2	Oney Anwar Q	(Indonesia)	9.40
3	Varun Tandjung E	(Indonesia)	7.50
4	Anra Milan E	(Sri Lanka)	6.70

Heat 9
1	Sam Coffey Q	(United States)	13.57
2	Santiago Muniz Q	(Argentina)	12.90
3	Momoto Tsuzuki E	(Japan)	8.83
4	Clinton Gravett E	(South Africa)	6.60

Heat 10
1	Bronson Meydi Q	(Indonesia)	12.67
2	Nyoman Satria Q	(Indonesia)	10.30
3	Anthony Fillingim E	(Costa Rica)	10.00
4	Remy Juboori E	(United States)	6.73

Heat 11
1	Mathis Crozon Q	(France)	12.87
2	Connor Lyons Q	(Australia)	11.33
3	David Noy E	(Israel)	8.14
4	Asanga Sunjeewa E	(Sri Lanka)	5.64

Heat 12
1	Thomas Cervi Q	(Australia)	14.33
2	Tomas Lopez Moreno Q	(Argentina)	12.10
3	Zachary Keenan E	(United States)	10.30
4	Sanjay Selvmani E	(India)	4.67

Heat 13
1	Mickey McDonagh Q	(Australia)	11.60
2	Mitch Parkinson Q	(Australia)	9.10
3	Hinata Aizawa E	(Australia)	8.36

Heat 14
1	Kurtis Vaughan Q	(Australia)	11.87
2	Callum Robson Q	(Australia)	11.83
3	Tully Wylie E	(Australia)	9.70
4	Muhannad Didaqt Musaddiq E	(Malaysia)	7.30

Heat 15
1	Ryan Slattery Q	(Australia)	11.54
2	Tipi Jabrik Q	(Indonesia)	10.33
3	Eduardo Mottz E	(Brazil)	9.97
4	Pablo Montero E	(Spain)	6.43

Heat 16
1	Gabriel Villaran Q	(Peru)	12.20
2	Luis Perloiro Q	(Portugal)	12.10
3	Anushantha Andradasa E	(Sri Lanka)	7.10
4	Blem Ben Zvi E	(Israel)	5.34

results

==== Round 3 ====
Heat 1
1	Noah Beschen Q	(Hawaii)	11.50
2	Paul Distinguin Q	(France)	10.90
3	Darcy Crump E	(Australia)	10.23
4	Praneeth Sandararuwan E	(Sri Lanka)	3.70

Heat 2
1	Ryland Rubens Q	(United States)	12.17
2	Te Butler Q	(New Zealand)	11.80
3	Rinto Oooto E	(Japan)	9.86
4	Kaiki Yamanaka E	(Japan)	9.44

Heat 3
1	Maddy Job Q	(Australia)	11.90
2	TeLucas Wrice Q	(Australia)	10.80
3	Koby Oberholzer E	(South Africa)	9.14
4	Kejiro Nishi E	(Japan)	7.03

Heat 4
1	Cooper Davies	(Australia)	14.40
2	Gaspard Larsonneur	(France)	10.34
3	Kei Kobayashi	(United States)	9.71

Heat 5
1	Rafael Teixeira Q	(Brazil)	12.74
2	Francisco Bellorin Q	(Venezuela)	11.47
3	Sandon Whittaker E	(Australia)	8.30
4	Dean Vandewalle E	(Belgium)	7.13

Heat 6
1	Dylan Moffat Q	(Australia)	10.03
2	Joh Azuchi Q	(Japan)	9.97
3	Gearoid McDaid E	(Republic of Ireland)	9.90
4	Kairi Noro E	(Japan)	6.00

Heat 7
1	Kai Tandler Q	(Australia)	14.80
2	Oney Anwar Q	(Indonesia)	14.57
3	Wesley Santos E	(Brazil)	12.70
4	Jose Gundesen E	(Argentina)	12.37

Heat 8
1	Jordy Maree Q	(South Africa)	13.04
2	Tomas King Q	(Costa Rica)	9.63
3	Lakshitha Madushan E	(Sri Lanka)	6.00
4	Arnau Riera E	(Spain)	5.10

Heat 9
1	Sam Coffey Q	(United States)	13.66
2	Leandro Usuna Q	(Argentina)	11.80
3	Nyoman Satria E	(Indonesia)	8.10
4	Amra Pranith E	(Sri Lanka)	5.77

Heat 10
1	Bronson Meydi Q	(Indonesia)	12.77
2	Santiago Muniz Q	(Argentina)	11.60
3	Arashi Kato E	(Japan)	7.83
4	Enzo Cavallini E	(France)	7.27

Heat 11
1	Victor Bernando Q	(Brazil)	14.77
2	Mathis Crozob Q	(France)	11.74
3	Tomas Moreno E	(Argentina)	10.87
4	Harley Ross E	(Australia)	8.23

Heat 12
1	Rio Waida Q	(Indonesia)	11.66
2	Thomas Cervi Q	(Australia)	10.00
3	Connor Lyons E	(Australia)	8.37
4	Pedro Neves E	(Brazil)	8.33

Heat 13
1	Jake Elkington Q	(South Africa)	13.80
2	Callum Robson Q	(Australia)	13.04
3	Mikey McDonagh E	(Australia)	11.83
4	Daiki Tanaka E	(Japan)	11.43

Heat 14
1	Luke Dillon Q	(United Kingdom)	11.67
2	Mitch Parkinson Q	(Australia)	11.23
3	Kurtis Vaughan E	(Australia)	7.63
4	Kenta Ishikawa E	(Japan)	6.70

Heat 15
1	Manuel Selman Q	(Chile)	12.63
2	Leo Etienne Q	(France)	10.63
3	Luis Perloiro E	(Portugal)	9.10
4	Ryan Slattery E	(Japan)	9.06

Heat 16
1	Gabriel Villaran Q	(Peru)	12.47
2	Skip McCullough Q	(United States)	12.17
3	Mark Occhilupo E	(Australia)	8.74
4	Tipi Jabrik E	(Indonesia)	6.30

==== Round 4 ====
Heat 1
1	Gaspard Larsonneur Q	(France)	9.73
2	Ryland Rubens Q	(United States)	8.50
3	Lucas Wrice E	(Australia)	6.96
4	Noah Beschen E	(Hawaii)	6.30

Heat 2
1	Te Butler Q	(New Zealand)	14.50
2	Paul Distinguin Q	(France)	13.43
3	Maddy Job E	(Australia)	11.63
4	Cooper Davies E	(Australia)	9.97

Heat 3
1	Rafael Teixeira Q	(Brazil)	11.44
2	Oney Anwar Q	(Indonesia)	10.70
3	Dylan Moffat E	(Australia)	10.53
4	Tomas King E	(Costa Rica)	8.04

Heat 4
1	Francisco Bellorin	(Venezuela)	12.50
2	Joh Azuchi	(Japan)	10.70
3	Kai Tandler	(Australia)	10.50
4	Jordy Maree E	(Australia)	9.83

Heat 5
1	Thomas Cervi Q	(Australia)	13.67
2	Sam Coffey Q	(United States)	12.20
3	Mathis Crozon E	(France)	11.43
4	Bronson Meydi E	(Indonesia)	10.60

Heat 6
1	Victor Bernardo Q	(Brazil)	14.56
2	Rio Waida Q	(Indonesia)	14.33
3	Leandro Usuna E	(Argentina)	14.03
4	Santiago Muniz E	(Argentina)	11.36

Heat 7
1	Leo Etienne Q	(France)	11.46
2	Luke Dillon Q	(United Kingdom)	10.50
3	Jake Elkington E	(South Africa)	9.73
4	Skip McCullough E	(United States)	6.96

Heat 8
1	Mitch Parkinson Q	(Australia)	18.43
2	Callum Robson Q	(Australia)	14.57
3	Gabriel Villaran E	(Peru)	13.36
4	Manuel Selman E	(Chile)	13.20

==== Round 5 ====
Heat 1
1	Te Butler Q	(New Zealand)	15.67
2	Oney Anwar Q	(Indonesia)	14.87
3	Joh Azuchi E	(Japan)	11.60
4	Gaspard Larsonneur E	(France)	11.00

Heat 2
1	Paul Distinguin Q	(France)	13.50
2	Rafael Teixeira Q	(Brazil)	13.10
3	Francisco Bellorin E	(Venezuela)	11.70
4	Ryland Rubens E	(United States)	10.67

Heat 3
1	Victor Bernardo Q	(Brazil)	16.00
2	Callum Robson Q	(Australia)	12.03
3	Luke Dillon E	(United Kingdom)	8.33
4	Thomas Cervi E	(Australia)	6.93

Heat 4
1	Mitch Parkinson Q	(Australia)	15.40
2	Leo Etienne Q	(France)	13.27
3	Rio Waida E	(Indonesia)	12.00
4	Sam Coffey E	(United States)	7.47

=== Quarterfinals ===
Heat 1: 1 / Te Kehukehu Butler / (New Zealand) / 13.10; 2 / Rafael Teixeira / (Brazil) / 12.86	Heat 2: 1 / Oney Anwar / (Indonesia) / 13.80; 2 / Paul Distinguin / (France) / 11.37	Heat 3: 1 / Victor Bernardo / (Brazil) / 16.43; 2 / Leo Etienne / (France) / 8.67	Heat 4: 1 / Mitch Parkinson / (Australia) / 14.43; 2 / Callum Robson / (Australia) / 12.87

=== Semifinals ===
Heat 1: 1 / Oney Anwar / (Indonesia) / 15.57; 2 / Te Kehukehu Butler / (New Zealand) / 14.90	Heat 2: 1 / Mitch Parkinson / (Australia) / 16.30; 2 / Victor Bernardo / (Brazil) / 15.00

==== Final ====
Heat 1
1	Mitch Parkinson	(Australia)	19.17
2	Oney Anwar	(Indonesia)	13.17
