= Okanda =

Okanda ඔකඳ உகந்தை
- Village
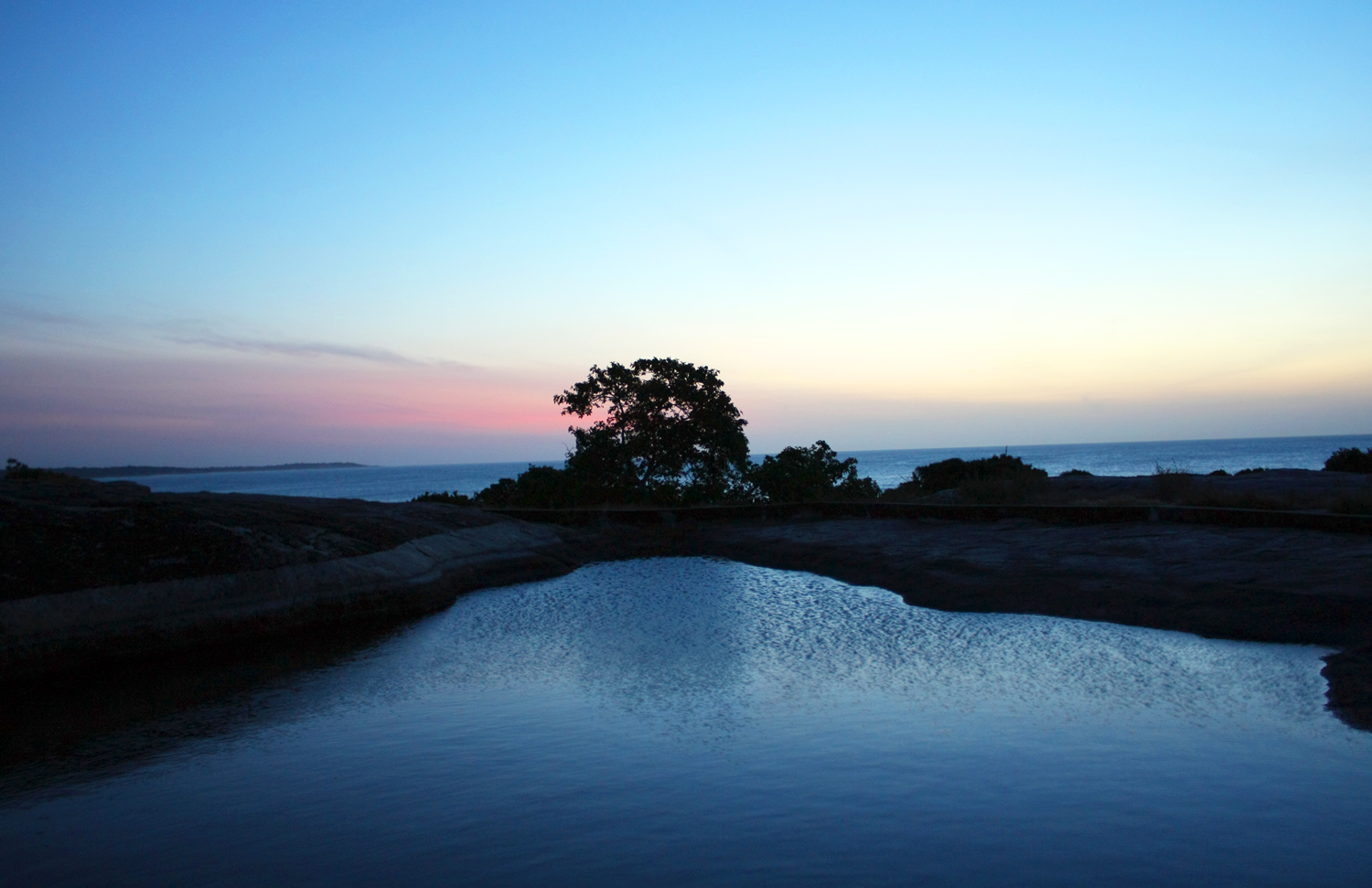
- Pond in front of Ukanthamalai Velayuda Swami Temple

- Location within Sri Lanka
- Coordinates: 6°39′0″N 81°46′0″E
- Country: Sri Lanka
- Province: Eastern
- District: Ampara

Okanda (Sinhala: ඔකඳ, romanized: okan̆da; Tamil: உகந்தை, romanized: Ukantai) is a small hamlet in the eastern coast of Sri Lanka within the Ampara District. It is known for its shrine dedicated to the Hindu deity Murugan, known as Ukanthamalai Murugan Kovil, and for surfing. Pilgrims from the Eastern Province and the Northern Province stop over at the Okanda Murugan temple on their Murugan Pada Yatra voyage to Kataragama temple in the southern part of the island.
