= Kumana National Park =

National park in Sri Lanka

- IUCN category II (national park)
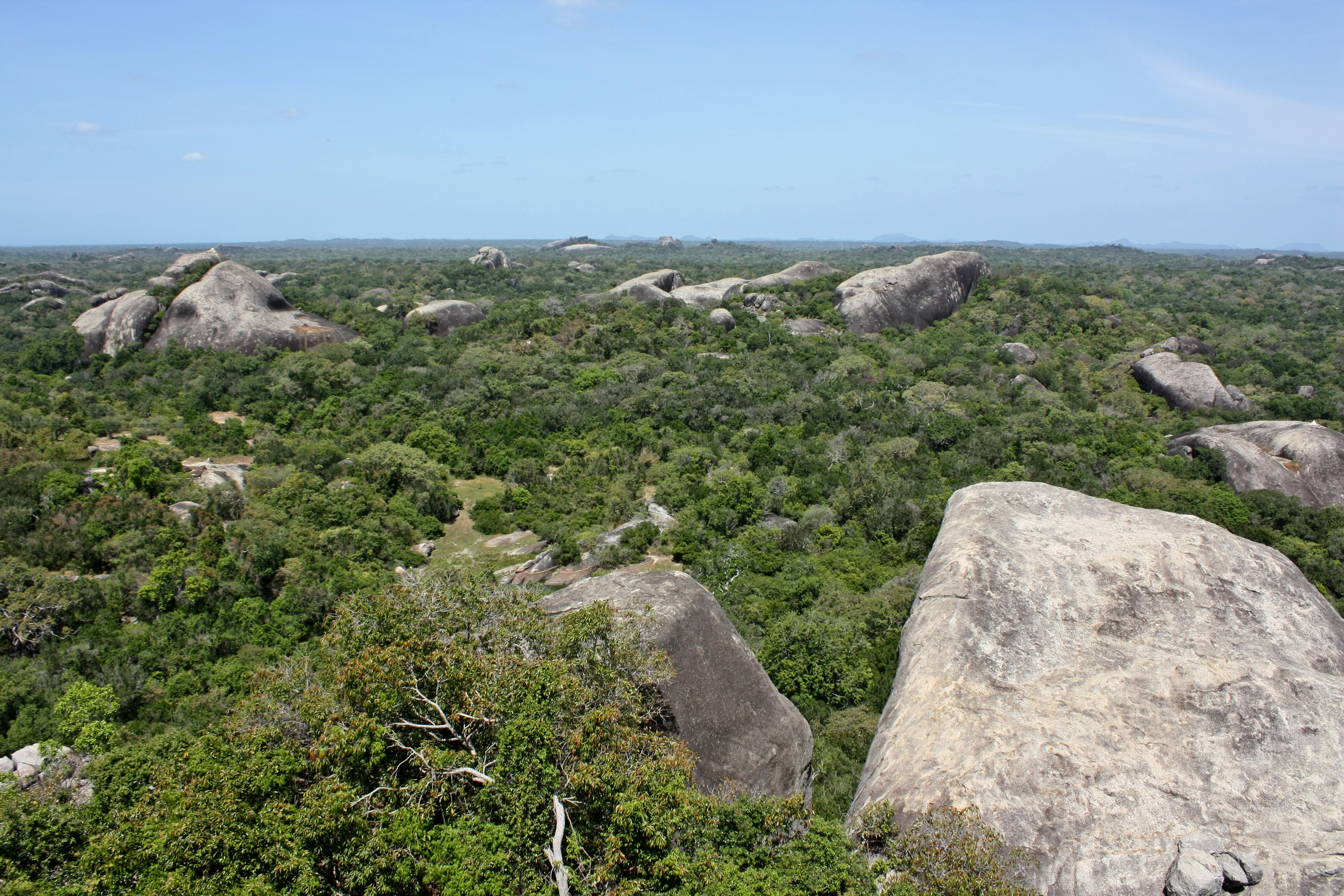
- Kudumbigala Sanctuary in Kumana National Park

- Location within Sri Lanka
- Location: Eastern Province, Sri Lanka
- Nearest city: Hambantota
- Coordinates: 6°30′47″N 81°41′16″E
- Area: 35,664 hectares (88,130 acres)
- Established: 20 January 1970
- Governing body: Department of Wildlife Conservation

Ramsar Wetland
- Official name: Kumana Wetland Cluster
- Designated: 29 October 2010
- Reference no.: 1931

Kumana National Park in Sri Lanka is renowned for its avifauna, particularly its large flocks of migratory waterfowl and wading birds. The park is 391 kilometres (243 mi) southeast of Colombo on Sri Lanka's southeastern coast. Kumana is contiguous with Yala National Park, and was formerly known as Yala East National Park and was renamed to its present name in 2006.

The park was closed from 1985 to March 2003 due to LTTE (Liberation Tigers of Tamil Elam) attacks. It was also affected by the Boxing Day tsunami in 2004.

== Physical features ==
Kumbukkan Oya forms the southern boundary of the national park. Some 20 lagoons and tanks support the extensive birdlife of the national park. The lagoons are shallow with depths less than 2 metres (6.6 ft). Kumana villu is subject to occasional inundation with seawater. The elevation of the area ranges from sea level to 90 metres (300 ft). The mean annual temperature is 27.3 °C (81.1 °F) and the area receives 1,300 millimetres (51 in) of annual rainfall.

== Flora ==
The park's wetland areas are surrounded by dry zone tropical thorn forest. The inland forest's flora is dominated by Manilkara hexandra (Sinhalese "palu"), Hemicyclea sepieria, Bauhinia racemosa, Cassia fistula ("ehela"), Chloroxylon swietenia ("burutha"), and Salvadora persica species. The dominant tree of the Kumana villu is Sonneratia caseolaris, while Typha angustifolia is the dominant reed. Terminalia arjuna trees dominate the riverine forests along the Kumbukkan Oya. The common aquatic plants of the swamp are colourful Ludwigia spp., Nelumbo nucifera, Nymphaea pubescens, Aponogeton spp. and Neptunia oleracea.

== Fauna ==
Kumana Bird Sanctuary, declared in 1938, is included within the Kumana National Park. Kumana is one of the most important bird nesting and breeding grounds in Sri Lanka. 255 species of birds have been recorded in the national park. From April to July tens of thousands of birds migrate to the Kumana swamp area. Rare species such as black-necked stork, lesser adjutant, Eurasian spoonbill, and great thick-knee are breeding inhabitants. Waders belonging to families Scolopacidae and Charadriidae are among the visitors to the area along with waterfowl. Pintail snipes migrate here flying 9,000 kilometres (5,600 mi) to 11,000 kilometres (6,800 mi) from Siberia. Asian openbill, glossy ibis, purple heron, great egret, Indian pond heron, black-crowned night heron, intermediate egret, little egret, spot-billed pelican, Indian cormorant, little cormorant, common moorhen, watercock, purple swamphen, white-breasted waterhen, pheasant-tailed jacana, black-winged stilt, lesser whistling duck and little grebe are the bird species migrate here in large flocks. Among the rare birds that migrate to the swap are the yellow-footed green pigeon, greater racket-tailed drongo, Malabar trogon, red-faced malkoha, and sirkeer malkoha. Pacific golden plover, greater sand plover, lesser sand plover, grey plover, ruddy turnstone, little ringed plover, wood sandpiper, marsh sandpiper, common redshank, common sandpiper, curlew sandpiper, little stint, common snipe, and pintail snipe are the common wading birds of the park.

Tilapia and mullet are the commonly fished varieties in the area while Channa spp. are also caught occasionally. Mugger crocodile, Indian flap-shelled turtle and Indian black turtle are the common reptiles inhabiting the park. Mammals such as golden jackal, wild boar, Sri Lankan elephant, European otter, and fishing cat also visit the swamp to feed. The number of elephants roaming in the Kumana is estimated at 30–40.

== Cultural significance and conservation ==
The Kumana area is part of an ancient civilization that goes back to the 3rd century BC. Rock inscriptions belonging to the 2nd and 1st centuries BC have also been found in the region. The Kumana National Park lies on the route of the traditional annual foot Pilgrimage to the Hindu temple at Kataragama. Both Tamil and Sinhalese communities take part in this pilgrimage.

The number of birds observed in the national park has fallen in recent years. Environmentalists and wildlife lovers have expressed their concern over a road planned to be constructed from Kirinda to Panama which will run along the coastline of the park.

== Flora and fauna of Kumana ==
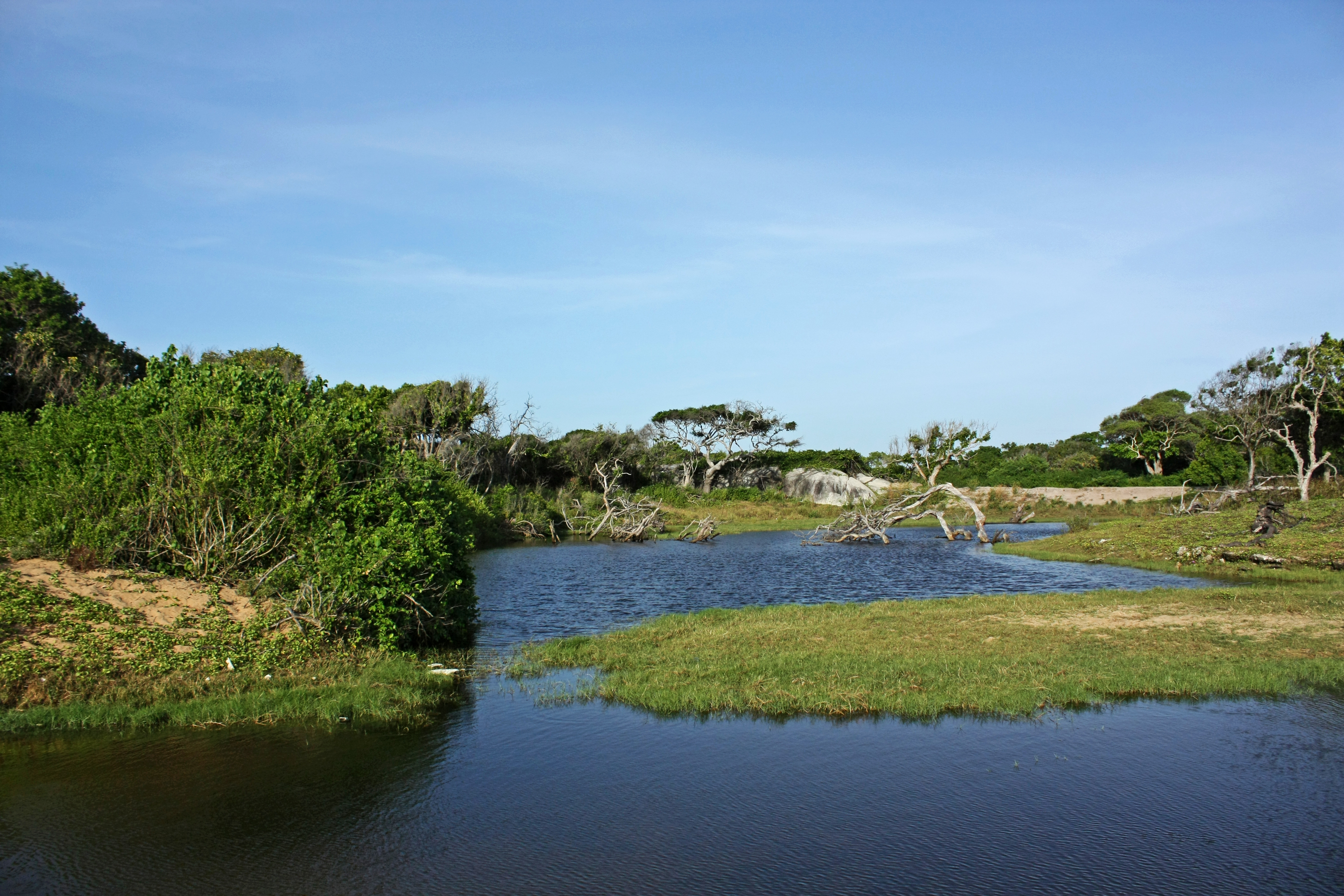
Lagoon

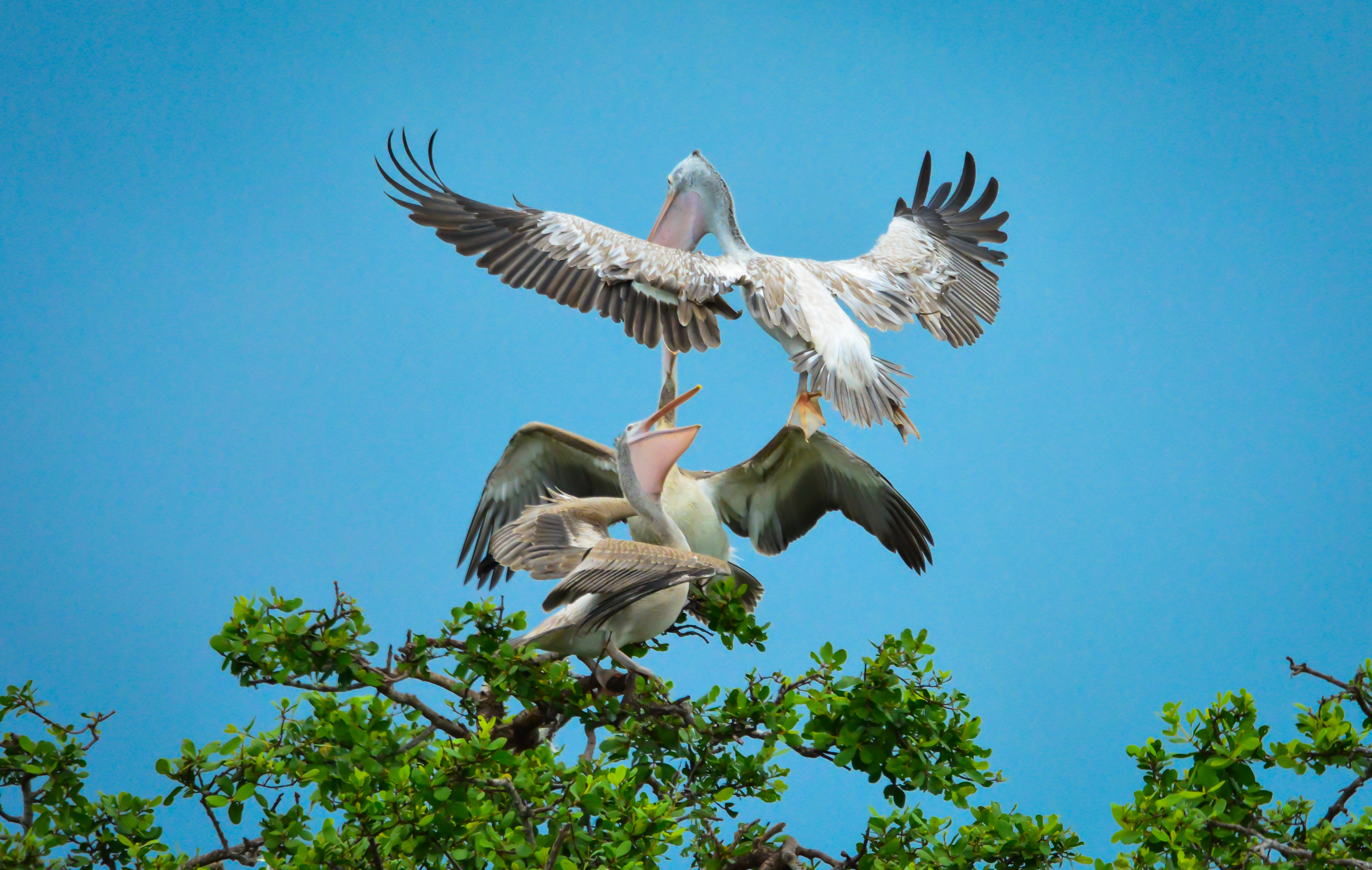
Pelican

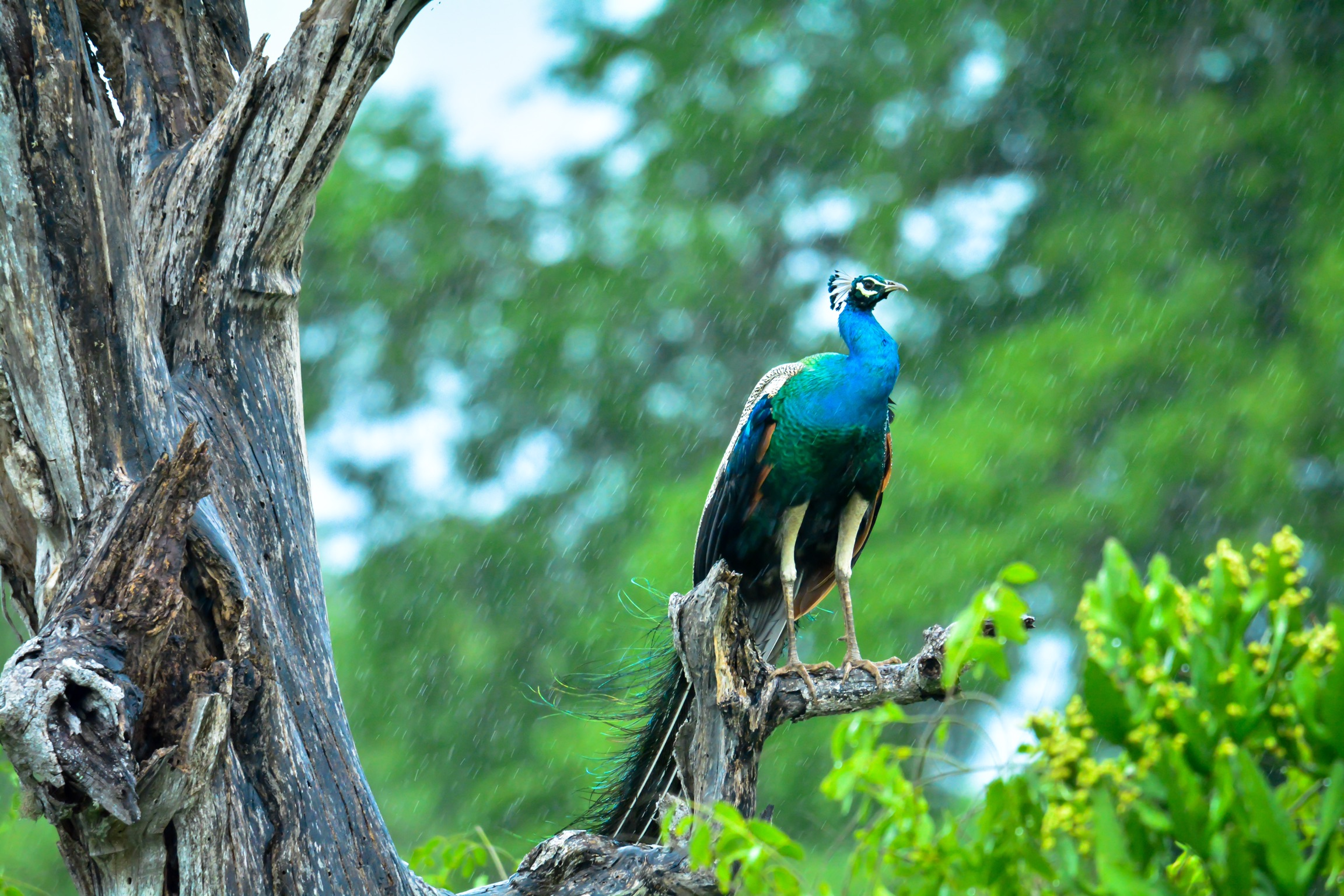
Indian peafowl

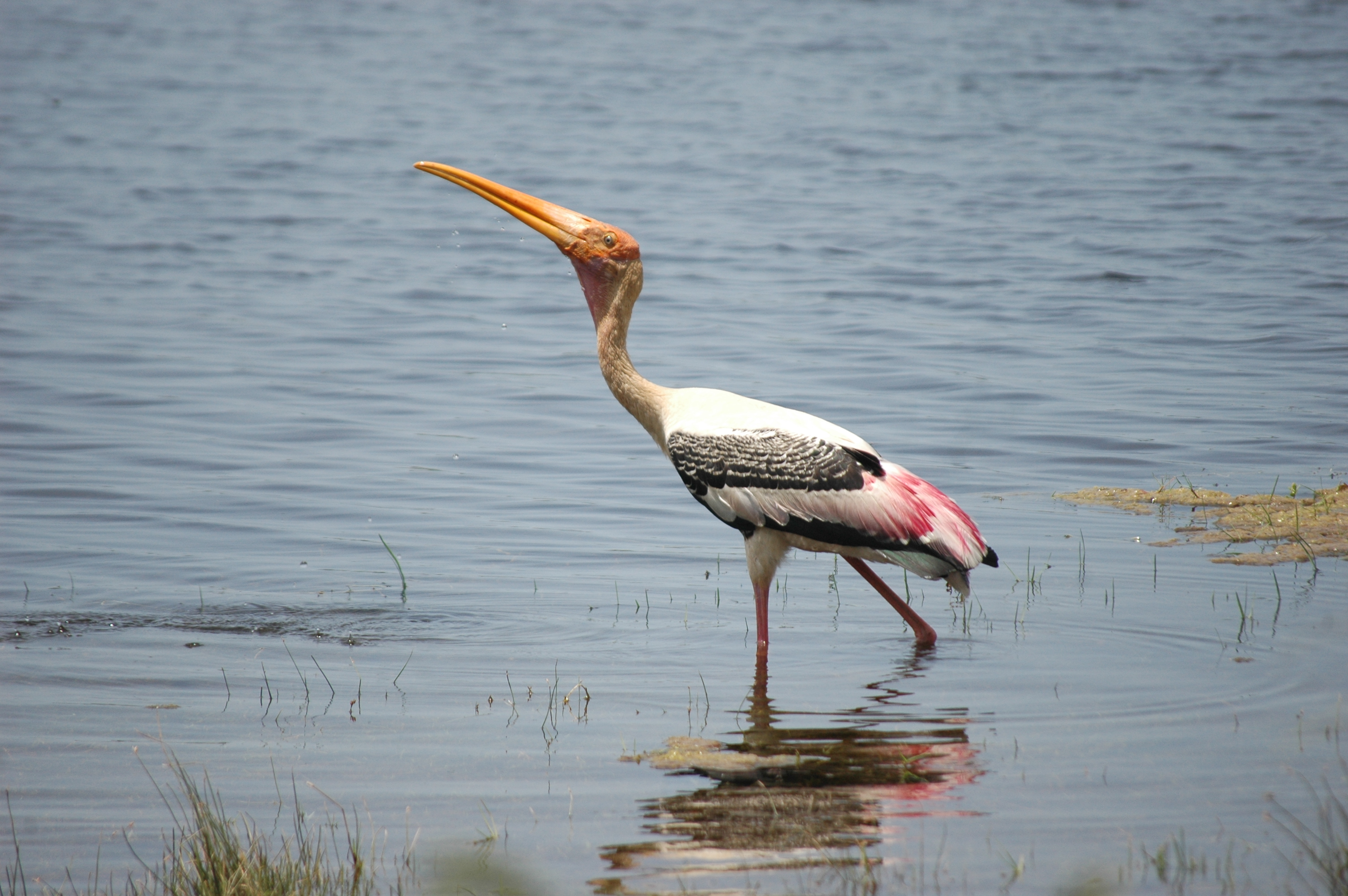
Painted stork

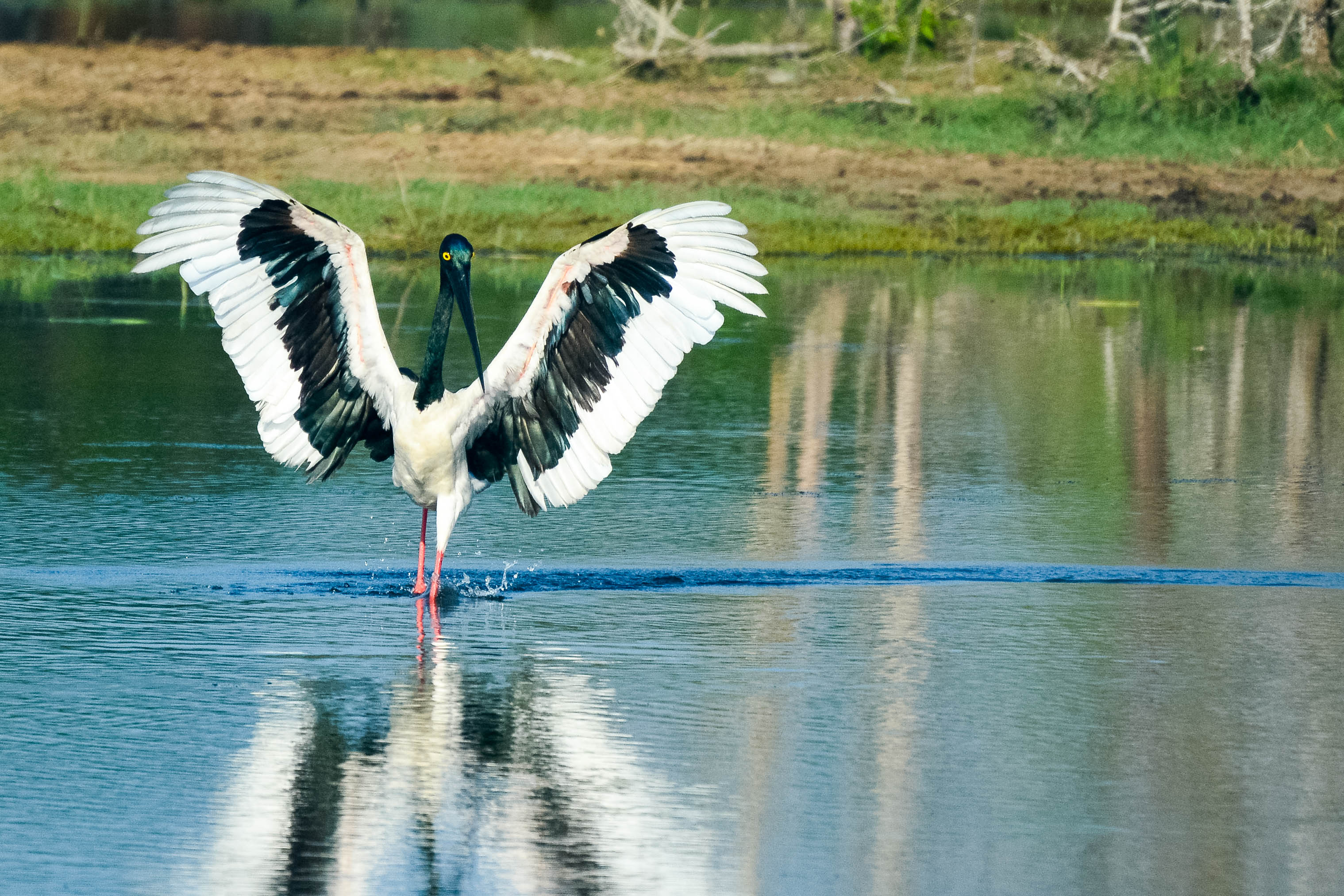
Black-necked stork

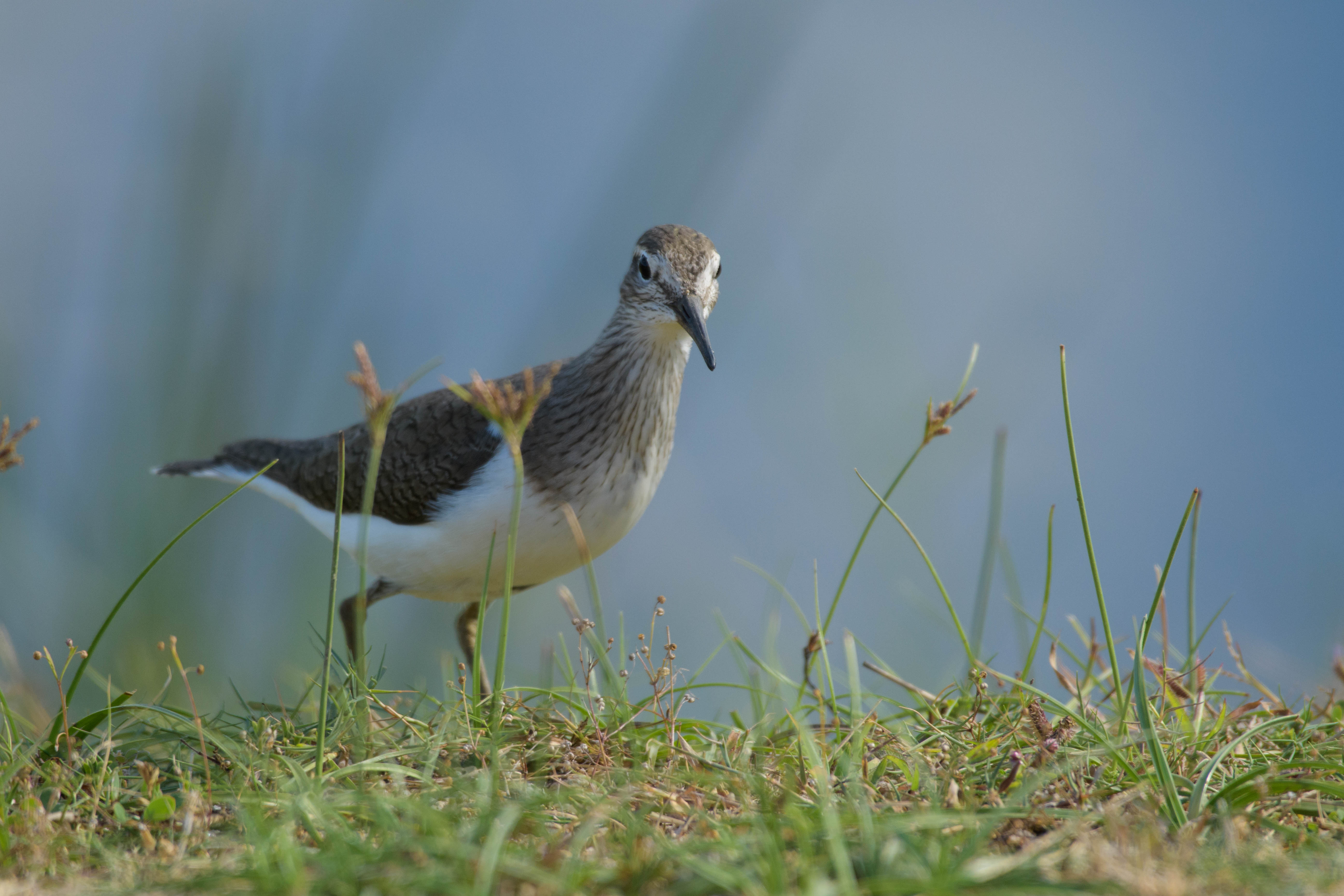
Common sandpiper

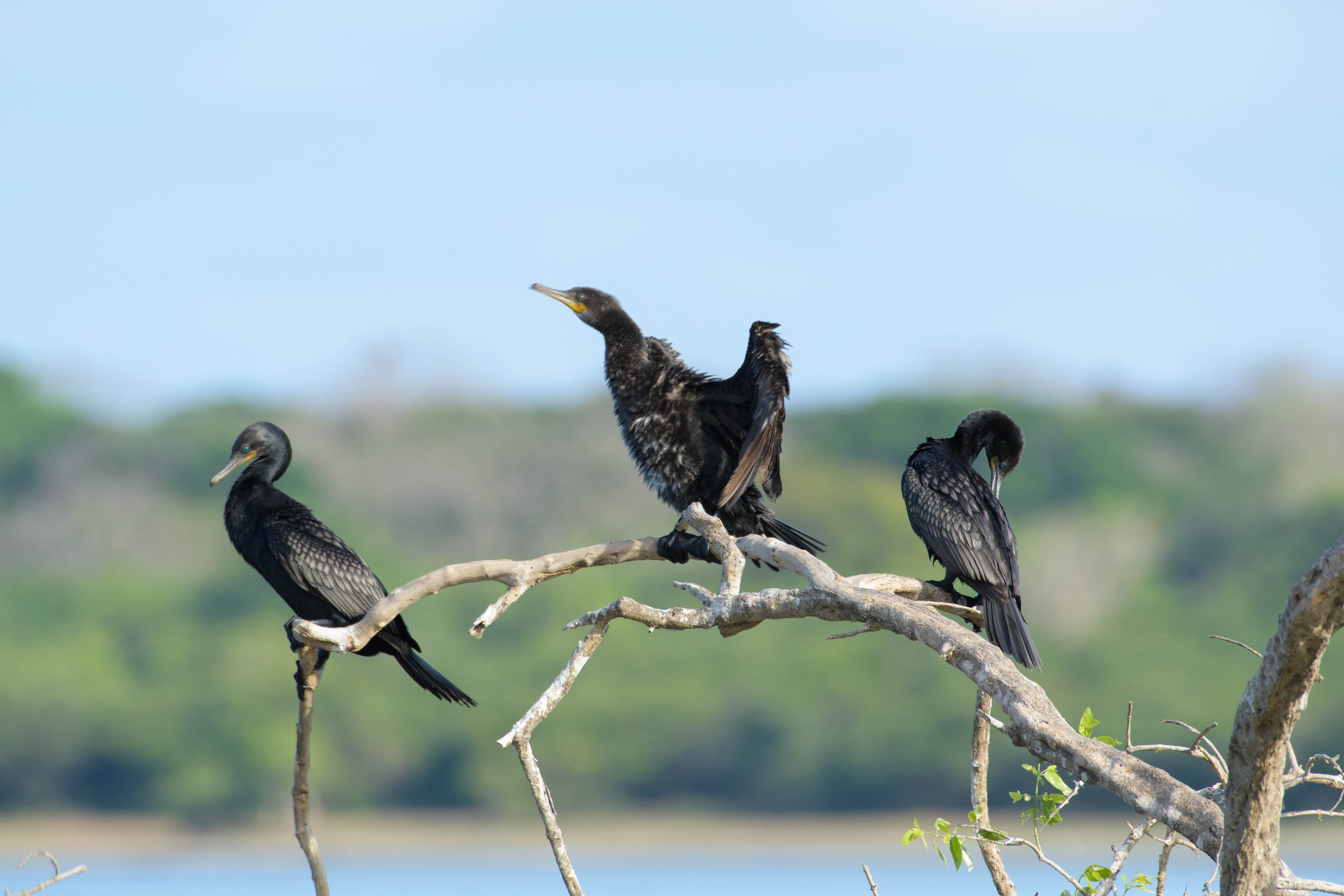
Indian cormorant

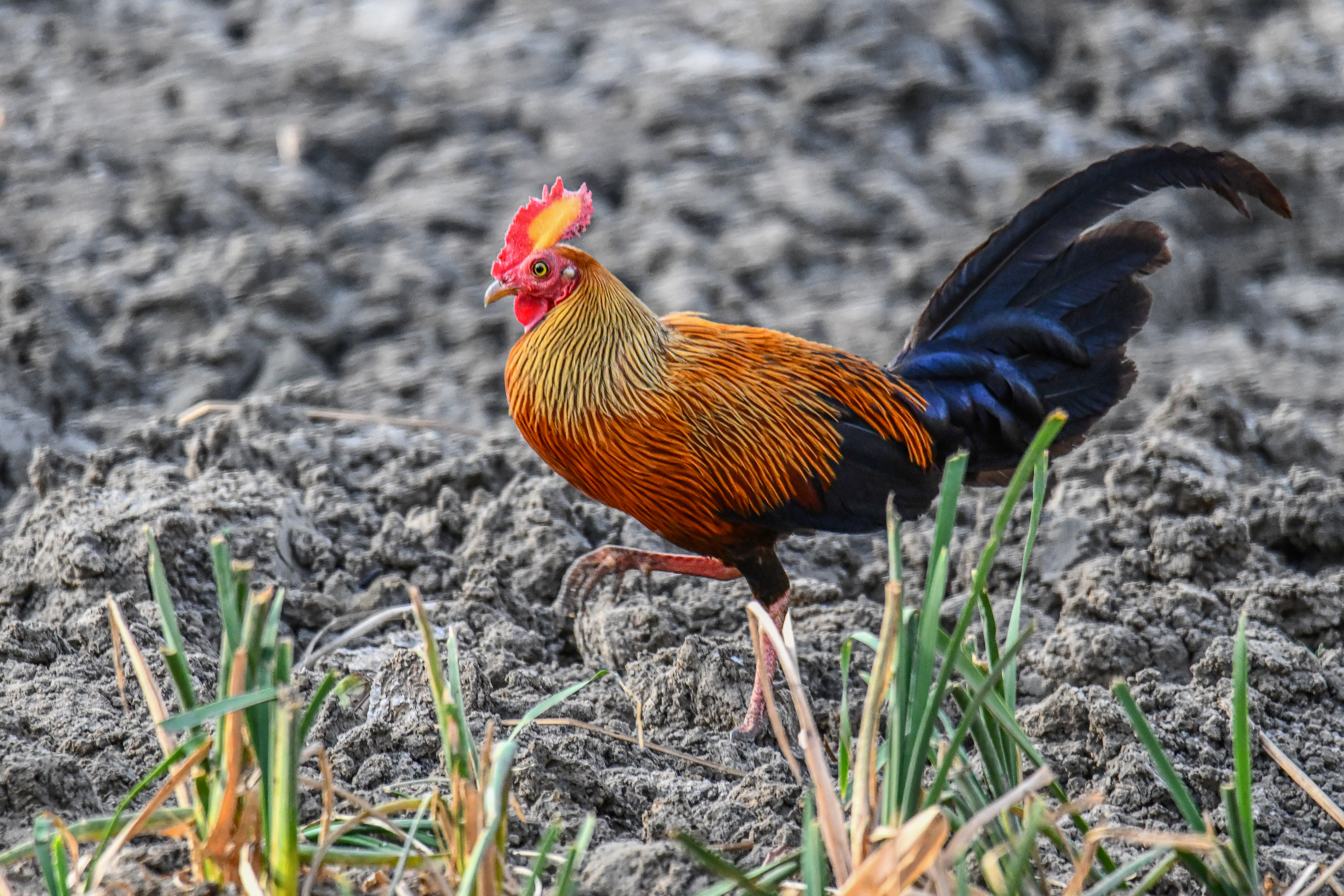
Sri Lankan junglefowl

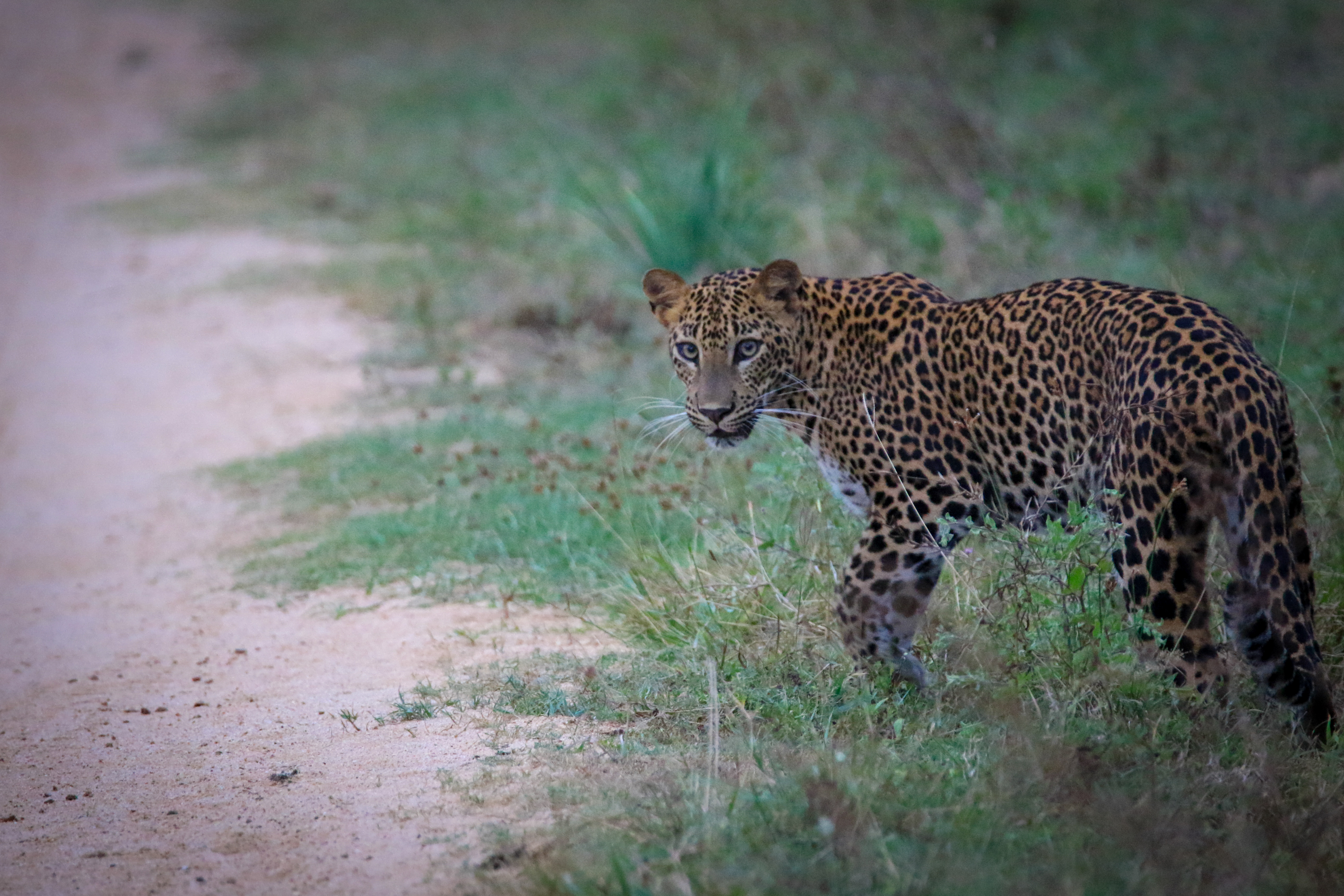
Sri Lankan leopard

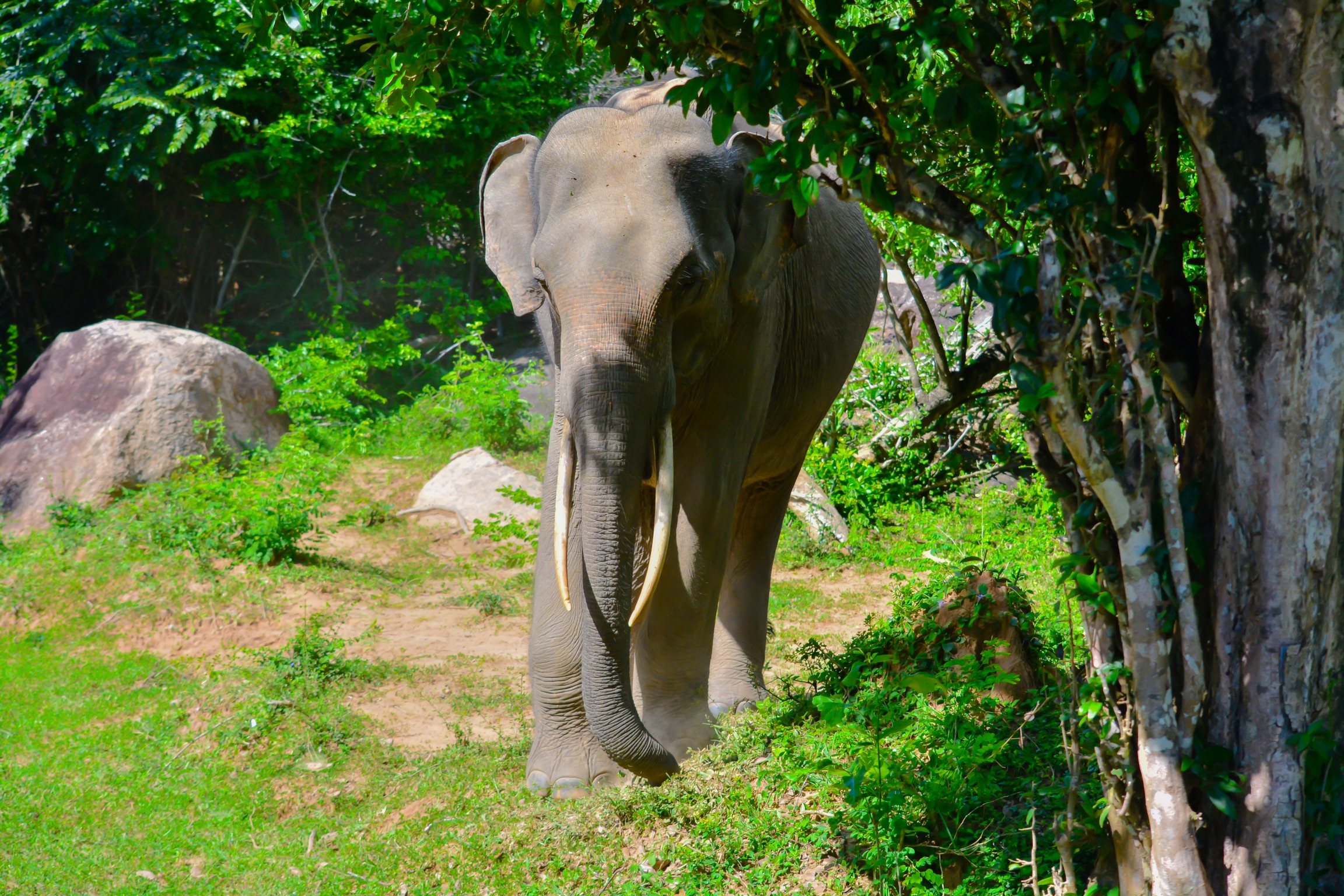
Sri Lankan elephant

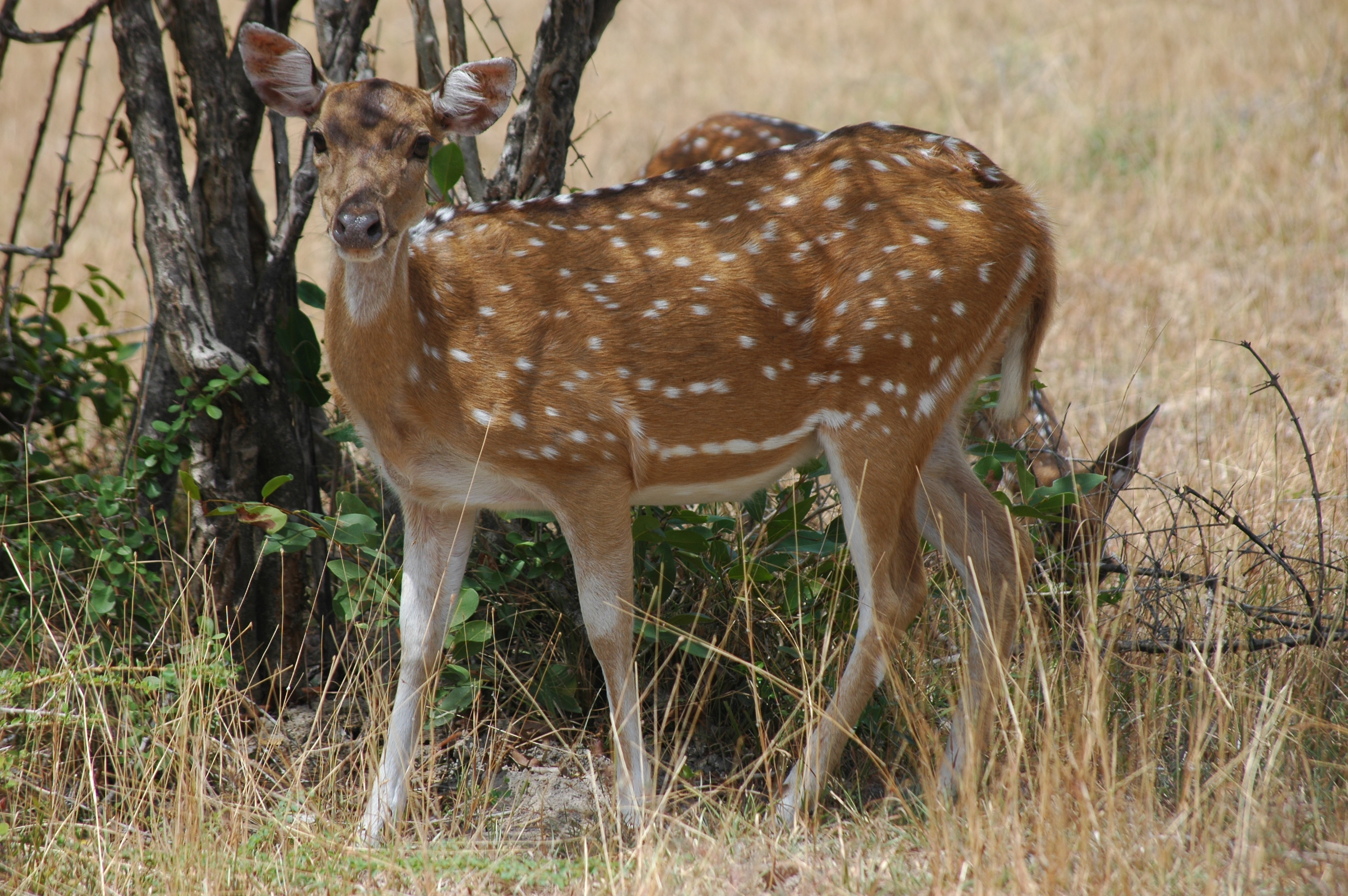
Sri Lankan axis deer

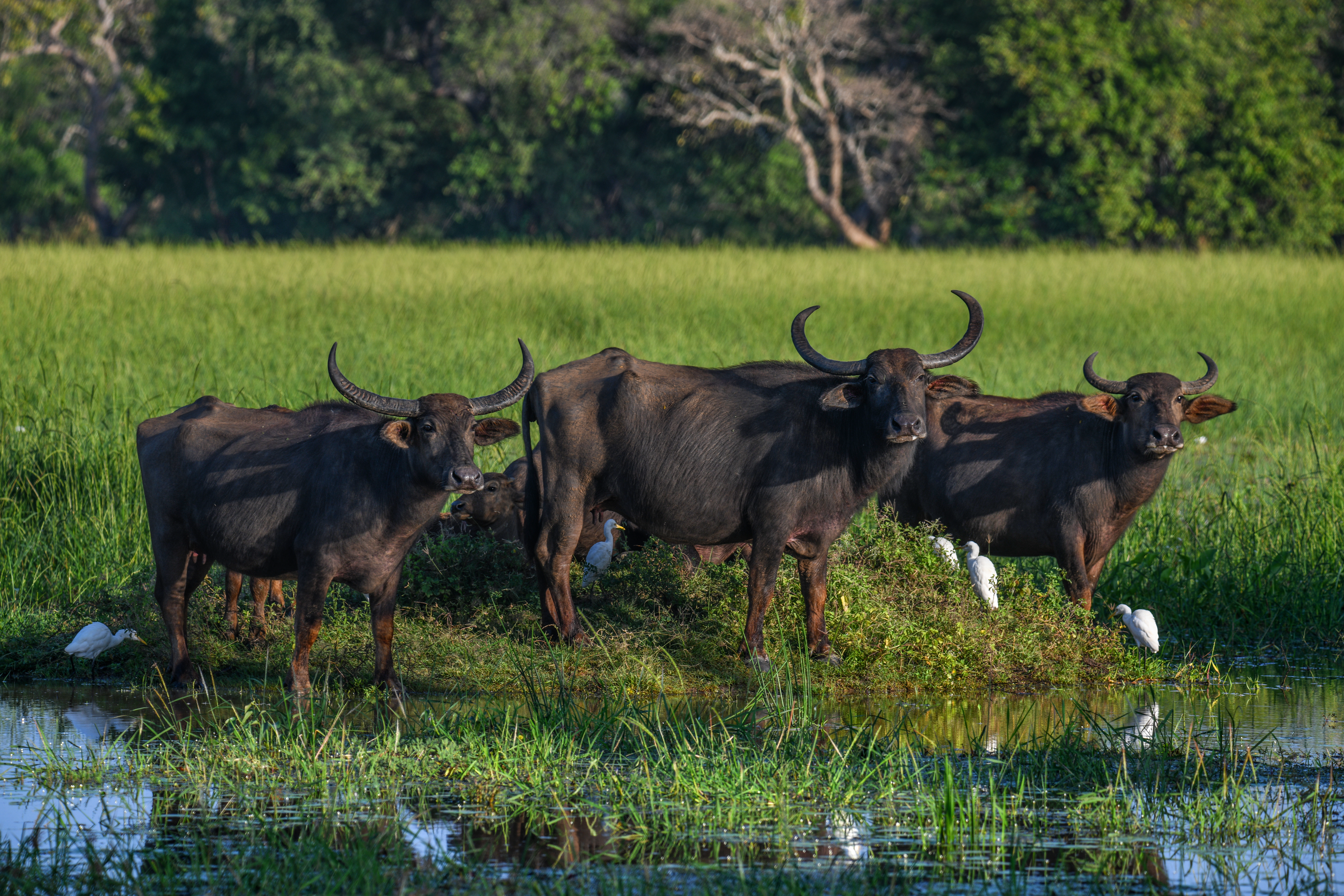
Wild water buffalo

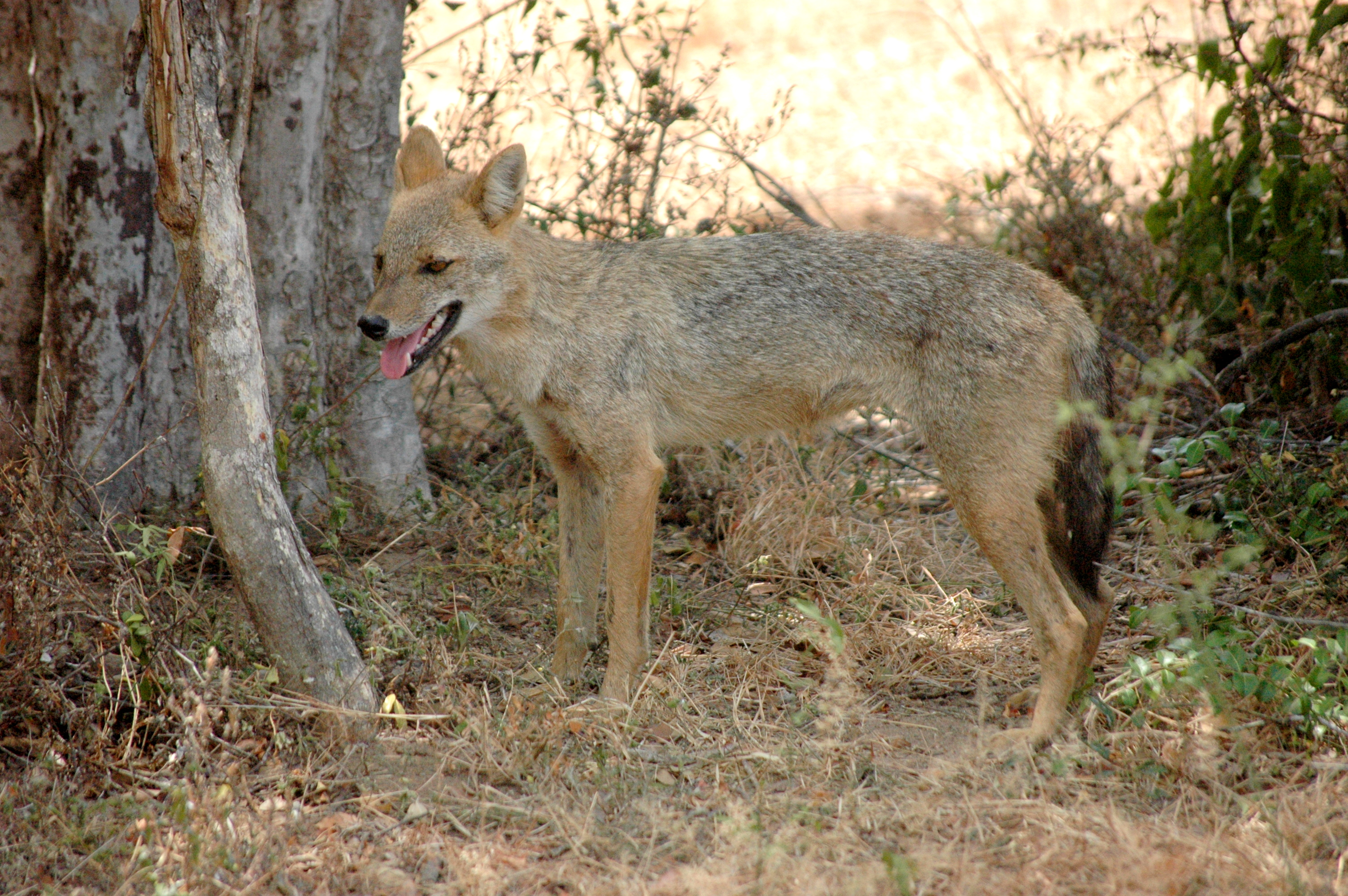
Sri Lankan jackal

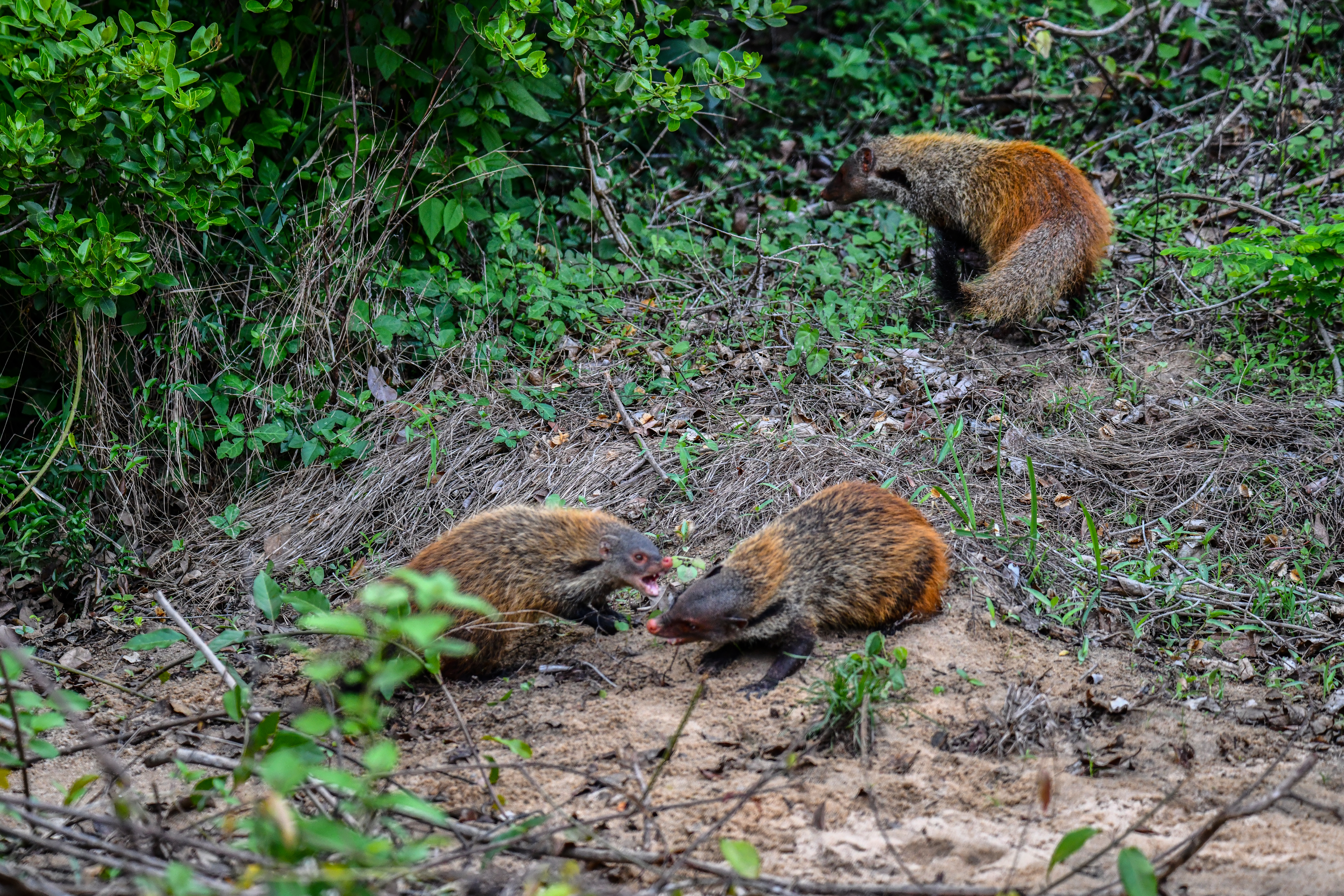
Stripe-necked mongoose

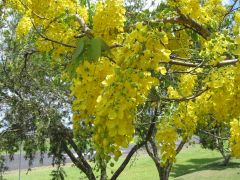
Cassia fistula

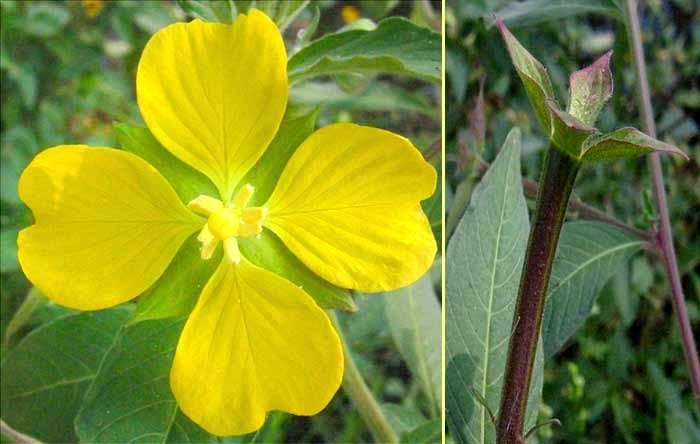
Ludwigia

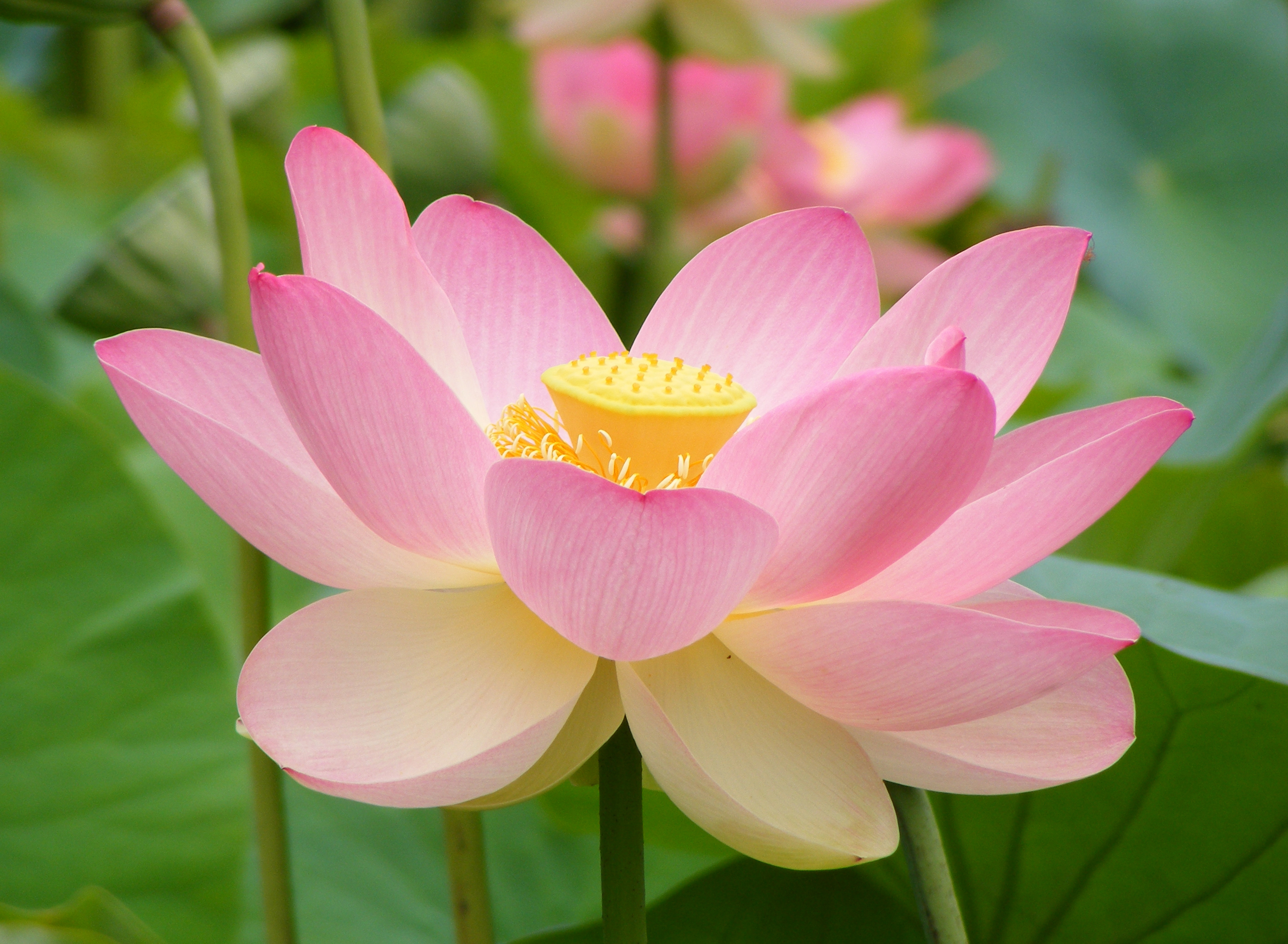
Nelumbo nucifera

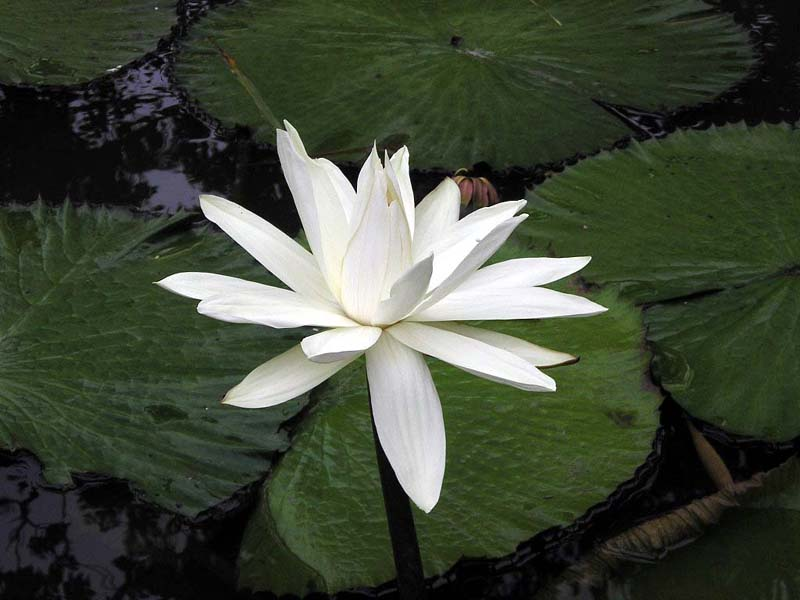
Nymphaea pubescens

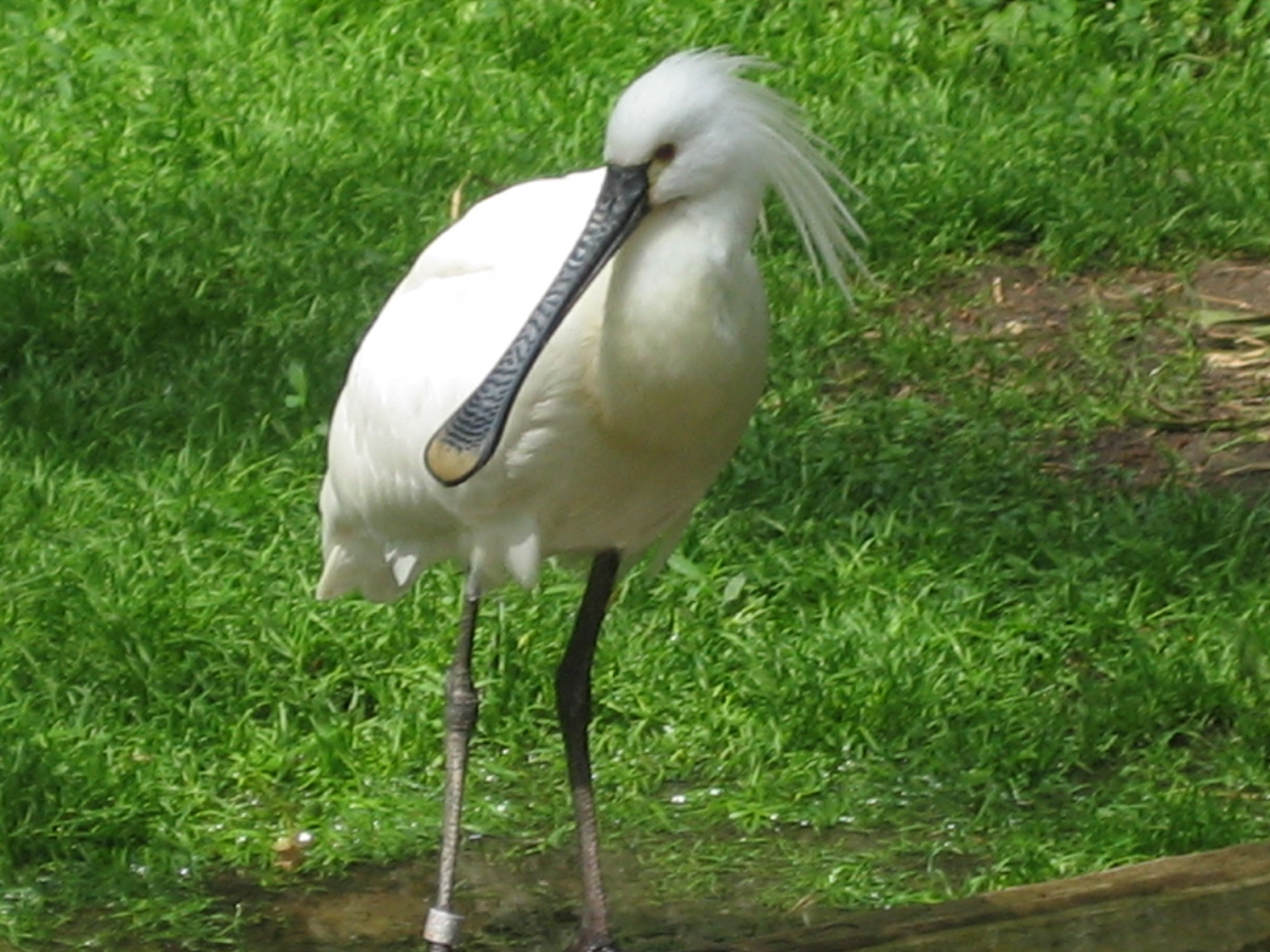
Eurasian spoonbill

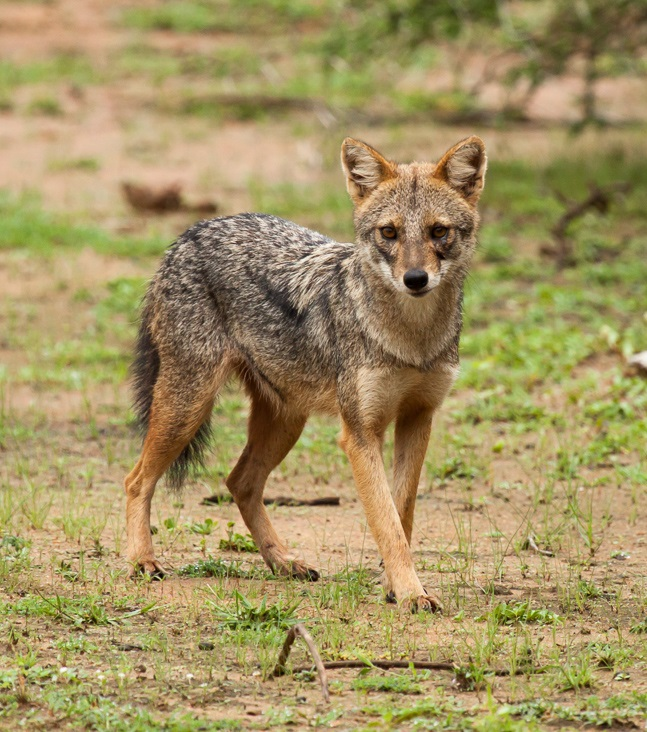
Golden jackal

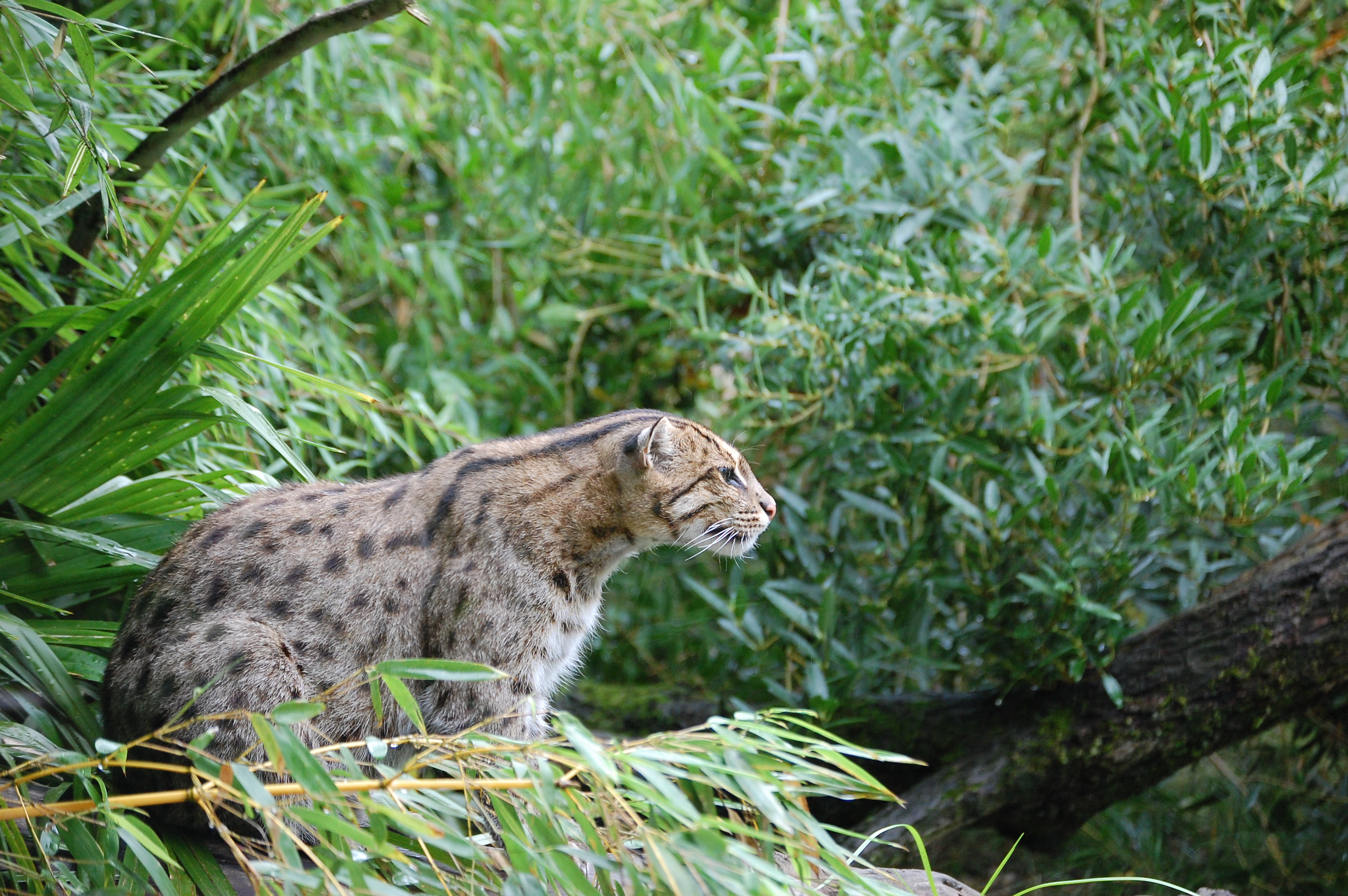
Fishing cat

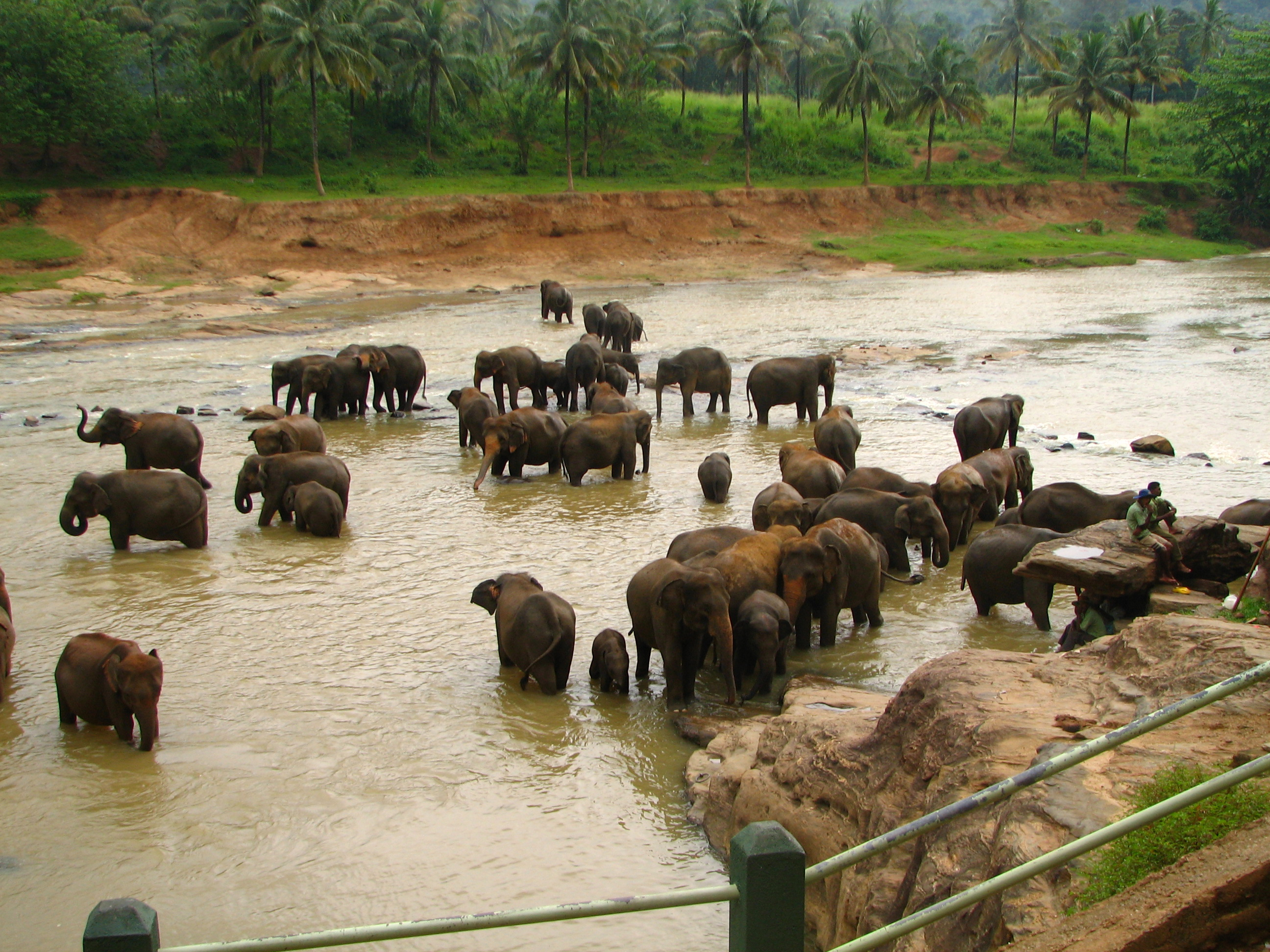
Sri Lankan elephants

== See also ==
- Protected areas of Sri Lanka
