= List of Archaeological Protected Monuments in Kurunegala District =

This is a list of Archaeological Protected Monuments in Kurunegala District, Sri Lanka.

Monument	Image	Location	Grama Niladhari Division	Divisional Secretary's Division	Registered	Description	Refs
Abhayarama Purana Vihara, Konpola		Konpola		Mallawapitiya	7 December 2001	Ancient image house	
Adagala Kandewatta ruins		Maraluwewa		Kurunegala	8 July 2005	Drip ledged caves	
Adawala Pothgul Vihara		Lihinigiriya		Polgahawela	7 December 2001	Ancient image house	
Ahugoda Purana Vihara		Ahugoda		Polgahawela	27 July 2001	The Stupa and Tempita Vihara	
Alawala inscription		Alawala	No. 624, Akkara Panaha	Rideegama	6 July 2007		
Alawwa house			Paramaulla	Alawwa	23 February 2007	The building belonging to Mr. V. K. Alawwa bearing assessment No. 3/66 adjoining Alawwa-Giriulla main road	
Algamakanda Vihara of Sri Sailabimbarama Vihara		Algama		Weerambugedara	23 February 2007	Cave Temple, Cave with drip-ledges in the top of the mountain and the natural cave known as Hatariyan Lena	
Ambagaswewa Purana Vihara			No. 226 Galambagaswewa	Mahawa	24 July 2009	The ancient Image house	
Annaruwa Sri Vijaya Sundararama Purana Vihara			No. 1149 Diyawala	Kuliyapitiya West	24 July 2009	The ancient Dhamma Sala (Preaching Hall) Sangawasaya (dwelling place) and two Rock Inscriptions	
Arankele Aranya Senasanaya				Ganewatta			
Athkanda Raja Maha Vihara		Kurunegala		Kurunegala	7 December 2001	The Buddha shrine and other archaeological remnants	
Aththanapitaya Purana Len Vihara		Aththanapitaya		Kurunegala	7 December 2001	Ancient cave temple	
Aththanapitaya Purana Len Vihara		Aththanapitaya		Kurunegala	27 July 2001	Ancient Buddha shrine	
Aththanapitaya Purana Len Vihara		Aththanapitaya		Kurunegala	8 July 2005	The drip ledged cave	
Averiyagala Rock Plane ruins			Hiripathwella	Polgahawela	24 July 2009	The Godella (Hillock) and the two Ponds in ruins	
Bambaragala Purana Vihara		Waduwawa		Alawwa	18 September 1974	Ancient cave temple	
Bambaragala Purana Vihara		Waduwawa		Alawwa	8 July 2005	The cave temple with drip ledged caves and inscriptions	
Bambaruwa Purana Vihara		Panagamuwa	Panagamuwa	Rideegama	6 July 2007	Ancient image house and 03 caves with drip ledges	
Bambawa Raja Maha Vihara		Ihalahewapola		Kurunegala	1 November 1996	The ancient image house and paintings	
Bamburugama Piriven Vihara		Bamburugama		Narammala	27 July 2001	The natural rock with small caves and other ruins	
Bamunawala Purana Gallen Vihara		Bamunawala		Kurunegala	8 July 2005	The drip ledged cave	
Bannaggama preaching hall			No. 440 Arankale	Kurunegala	21 October 2010	The Ancient building complex in ruins Bannaggama preaching hall	
Bathalagoda Wewa Ruins		Bamunumulla	Bamunumulla	Panduwasnuwara	6 July 2007	Dagaboa mound and the remains belonging to Tempita viharaya situated above the boundary of Bathalagoda Wewa	
Bihalpola Purana Tempita Vihara		Bihalpola		Kuliyapitiya	19 October 1973	Ancient Vahalkada	
Bihalpola Purana Tempita Vihara		Bihalpola		Kuliyapitiya	23 February 1967	Ancient Tempita vihara and the Temple of tooth	
Bimpokuna Purana Vihara			Bimpokuna	Galgamuwa	6 June 2008	The drip ledged stone cave with cave inscriptions, stone pillars and dagoba	
Bingiriya Raja Maha Vihara		Viharagama	Kiniyama	Bingiriya	22 November 1974	Ancient Tempita Vihara	
Bisogala ruins			No. 711, Handagama	Kurunegala	21 October 2010	The Drip-ledge cave	
Bodhirukkharama Purana Pothgul Vihara		Talawattegedara		Polgahawela	7 December 2001	Ancient Tempita Vihara	
Bogahamula watta ruins		Diyadora Ihala Kotte		Kuliyapitiya West	17 November 1967	Ancient ruins of buildings	
Bogahamula watta Kalugala		Bandaragala	Bandaragala	Mawathagama	6 July 2007	Inscription, remains of buildings with foundations of pillars, stone pillars and ancient dagaba	
Budugalahena		Egalla	Egalla	Polgahawela	24 July 2009	The drip-ledged cave (lena)	
Budumuththawa Purana Tempita Vihara		Budumuththawa	Pingama	Nikaweratiya	12 August 1966	The ancient Tempita Vihara	
Bujaslena Raja Maha Vihara		Ganegoda		Mawathagama	8 July 2005	Ancient cave temple, Drip ledged cave and Raja Pihilla	
Bulnewa Raja Maha Vihara			No. 358 - Bulnewa	Polpithigama	23 January 2009	The Tempita vihara	
Dandagamuwa Sri Sudharmarama Purana Vihara		Dandagamwa	No. 1192, Dandagamwa East	Kuliyapitiya	23 February 2007	Tampita Vihara and the Hevisi Mandapaya opposite the Tampita Vihara	
Delwita Purana Vihara		Delwita	No. 569, Delwita	Rideegama	6 July 2007	Ancient image house	
Devapita Vihara		Wataraka Wangutenne	Wataraka	Mawathagama	6 June 2008	The Tampita Vihara	
Devategedara Wele Ambalama			Devategedara	Polgahawela	24 July 2009		
Digampitiya Tempita Vihara		Digampitiya		Mawathagama	22 November 2002	Ancient Tempita Vihara	
Digampitiya Tempita Vihara		Digampitiya	Galapittamulle	Mawathagama	6 June 2008	The Tampita Vihara	
Dimbulagala Vihara		Diwulgane	No. 111-Diwulwewa	Ehetuwewa	6 June 2008	Two buildings with stone pillars, ancient Buddha shrine	
Diyagambe Purana Vihara			No. 138, Kattambuwawa	Mahawa	6 July 2007	Cave and cave temple with dripledges, two inscriptions and four rock inscriptions	
Doluwawatta ruins		Doluwawatta	No. 189 Doluwa	Ibbagamuwa	24 July 2009	All Drip-Ledged Caves, carved with Brahmi Letters, stone staircase, Drains, Stupa, and the venue of stone pillars (destructed)	
Dorabawila Vihara		Dorabawila		Panduwasnuwara	2 June 1950		
Dorabawila Vihara		Dorabawila		Kobeigane	22 November 2002	Ancient Tempita Vihara	
Edandawala Raja Maha Vihara			Edandawala	Maspotha	24 July 2009	The Tampita Image house (built on stone Piles)	
Ellewela Galkanda ruins		Embelepola	No. 956 Wadakade	Polgahawela	24 July 2009	The cave covering bearing pre-historic evidence, the Rock summit with drain openings, building in ruins, the flight of steps carved on the original rock and the rock plane in the Mountain	
Galadenikada Purana Vihara		Galadenikada		Polgahawela	7 December 2001	Ancient cave temple	
Galadenikada Purana Vihara		Galadenikada		Polgahawela	8 July 2005	Ancient cave temple with dripledged caves	
Galayaya Sri Sudharamarama Purana Vihara			No. 1546 Ihala Galyaya	Pannala	24 July 2009	The Tampita Image House (Image house built on stone piles)	
Galdenikada Purana Vihara			Aragoda	Kurunegala	21 October 2010	The drip-ledged caves (Len) and small cave temple (Len Viharaya) with ancient paintings and sculpture	
Galdeniya Sailarama Purana Vihara			Galdeniya	Alawwa	23 January 2009	The cave vihare and the drip ledged caves	
Galkamatta Inscription		Pathayala	No. 1008-Ihala Kalalpitiya	Alawwa	6 June 2008	The inscription in the place	
Galkamatta Inscription		Pathayala	No. 1008-Ihala Kalalpitiya	Alawwa	23 January 2009		
Galmuththagala Purana Vihara		Egalla		Polgahawela	7 December 2001	Ancient image house	
Ganagamuwa Poorvarama Vihara			No. 1139 Ganagamuwa	Kuliyapitiya East	24 July 2009	The Tampita Image house (Image house built on stone piles)	
Ganegoda Sanweli Raja Maha Vihara			Hanwella	Maspotha	24 July 2009	The ancient cave temple (Len Viharaya)	
Ganekanda Gallen Vihara		Ganekanda	Alawwa North	Alawwa	23 February 2007	Cave Temple with drip-ledges in the premises	
Ganewewa Purana Vihara			No. 329, Diwullegoda	Nikaweratiya	21 October 2010	The ancient Image house	
Ganewewa Purana Vihara			No. 329, Diwullegoda-Nikaweratiya Division	Kurunegala	21 October 2010	The ancient Image house	
Gedigamuwa Raja Maha Vihara		Udukedeniya		Polgahawela	7 December 2001	Ancient cave temple	
Ginikarawa Raja Maha Vihara			No. 771, Ginikarawa	Kurunegala	21 October 2010	The drip-ledged cave temple (Len Vihara)	
Giriguharama Vihara		Rukmale		Narammala	22 November 2002	Ancient cave temple	
Gomadiyagala Vihara		Halmillewa		Polpithigama	22 November 2002	Ancient Len Vihara and rock inscription	
Gotabhaya Cave Temple		Panaliya		Polgahawela	22 November 2002	The image house in the drip ledged cave and the pillar inscription	
Gotabhaya Cave Temple		Panaliya		Polgahawela	8 July 2005	Ancient cave temple and the pillar inscription	
Habbelikanda Forest Hermitage		Pambadeniya	Maldeniya	Alawwa	23 February 2007	Cave with drip-ledges and inscriptions and caves with drip ledges	
Handagama Vihara			No. 771, Handagama	Kurunegala	21 October 2010	The drip-ledged with cave	
Handungirigama Magampura Raja Maha Vihara		Beruwewa		Mahawa	1 November 1996	Ancient image house and paintings	
Hangamuwa Raja Maha Vihara		Hangamuwa		Polpithigama	22 November 2002	Ancient Stup and image house	
Hatthikuchchi				Giribawa			
Henegedara ruins			No. 267, Henegedara	Rasnayakapura	6 July 2007	The cave with dripledges and dagoba mound in the area with the stone in the area of Lot 80	
Humbuluwa Raja Maha Vihara			East Humbuluwa	Alawwa	23 February 2007	Ancient Cave Temple and Cave with drip-ledges and inscriptions	
Ibbagala Raja Maha Vihara		Ibbagala		Kurunegala	8 July 2005	Ancient cave temple	
Inguruwatta Tempita Vihara		Inguruwatta		Mawathagama	6 June 2008	The Tampita Vihara	
Inguruwatta Tempita Vihara		Arambepola		Polgahawela	23 January 2009	The Tempita Vihara	
Jayasundararama Vihara		Imbulgoda		Polgahawela	7 December 2001	Ancient image house and the Stupa	
Jethawana Piriven Vihara		Kurunegala	No. 840, Kurunegala North Eastern	Kurunegala	21 October 2010	The two drip - ledged cave	
Kadawalagedara Tempita Vihara		Kadawalagedara		Kuliyapitiya East	11 October 1974	Tempita vihara and the Stupa	
Kadigala Rajangana ruins			No. 15-Sarasumgala	Giribawa	6 June 2008	The flight of steps on the rock on which the Kadigala three drip ledged rock caves situated on the Rajangana Left Bank, and the ancient dagoba mound	
Kahatawilagedara Purana Tempita Vihara		Kahatawilagedara		Katupotha	23 February 1967	Ancient Tempita vihara	
Kajuwatta Devalaya			No. 1042 Dambadeniya South	Narammala	24 July 2009		
Kalalpitiya Purana Vihara			No. 1008-Ihala Kalalpitiya	Alawwa	6 June 2008	The drip ledged cave	
Kalalpitiya Purana Vihara			No. 1008-Ihala Kalalpitiya	Alawwa	23 January 2009	The cave vihare	
Karagahagedara Ambalama				Narammala			
Karandawila Raja Maha Vihara		Karandawila		Udubaddawa	9 September 1965	Ancient monuments	
Kasagala Purana Raja Maha Vihara		Kumbukgete		Ibbagamuwa	1 November 1996	Ancient image house and paintings	
Kathgala Ruins		Dambadeniya		Narammala	27 July 2001	The natural rock with ancient ruins	
Katupitiya Tempita Vihara		Katupitiya	Katupitiya	Kurunegala	22 November 2002	Ancient Tempita Vihara and other ruins in the preises	
Kebellena Vihara		Egodagama		Wariyapola	6 August 1965	Ancient Buddha shrine	
Keppetiwalana Purana Vihara			No. 1009- Keppetiwalana	Alawwa	6 June 2008	The Buddha shrine	
Keppetiwalana Vihara		Keppetiwalana vihare idama	No. 13- Keppetiwalana	Alawwa	6 June 2008	The ancient Stupa	
Kimbulwana Oya ancient anicut			No. 457 Kuda Uyangalle and No. 459 Thibiriwewa	Ganewatta	13 February 2009	The ancient Anicut	
Kohongaha Gedara Sri Bodhidramaramaya Vihara			No. 1164, Kangahagedara	Kuliyapitiya	24 July 2009	The Tampita Viharaya (Viharaya built on stone piles)	
Kolambagama Purana Tempita Vihara		Kolambagama		Katupotha	19 May 1967	Ancient Tempita vihara	
Kollura Kanda Mountain ruins		Kollure	No. 923 Kollure	Polgahawela	24 July 2009	The Drip-ledged cave as the South-eastern slope of the Kollura Kanda Mountain	
Konduruwapola Raja Maha Vihara			No. 1140, Konduruwapola	Kuliyapitiya East	24 July 2009	The Tampita Image house (Image house built on stone piles)	
Kotagalakanda Vihara		Kotagala		Narammala	27 July 2001	Drip ledged caves, the Stupa	
Kotavehera Vihara		Hatalispahuwa		Polgahawela	7 December 2001	Ancient image house, Stupa mound	
Kottanga inscription		Kottanga	No. 601, Ogodapola	Rideegama	6 July 2007		
Kuda Dambulu Vihara		Moragollagama		Galgamuwa	1 November 1996	Ancient image house and paintings	
Kuda Dambulu Vihara		Angamuwa	No. 126-Nabadewa	Ehetuwewa	6 June 2008	The cave vihara, square-shaped building construction with stone pillars	
Kudagalgamuwa Tempita Vihara		Kudagalgamuwa		Maspotha	25 April 1980	Tempita vihara	
Kudagalkadawela Aranya Senasanaya		Kudagalkadawala		Giribawa	23 January 2009	The four drip ledged rock cave	
Kumbalwala Purana Vihara		Kumbalwala		Kuliyapitiya	1 November 1996	Ancient image house and paintings	
Kurunegala Old Magistrate's Court building		Kurunegala Town	Kurunegala Town (North East)	Kurunegala	10 July 2009	The Old Magistrate's Court building bearing Assessment No. 1, Colombo Road, Kurunegala	
Lihiniyagalla Saliya Raja Maha Vihara		Upper Katugampala	No. 1,560 Katugampala	Pannala	6 June 2008	The ancient Buddha shrine	
Lihiniyagalla Saliya Raja Maha Vihara		Upper Katugampala	No. 1,560 Katugampala	Pannala	24 July 2009	The ancient Image house	
Lihiniyawatta Sri Gallen Purana Vihara		Lihiniyawatta		Narammala	27 July 2001	Drip ledged cave temple and Buddha shrine	
Madawala Purana Raja Maha Vihara		Madawala	No. 1010- Madawala	Alawwa	6 June 2008	The cave vihare with inscriptions and drip ledged cave	
Madawala Raja Maha Vihara		Madawala		Alawwa	1 July 1966	Ancient cave temple	
Madawala Raja Maha Vihara		Madawala		Alawwa	6 June 2008	The cave vihare with inscriptions and drip ledged cave	
Maduwegala Aranya Senasanaya		Moragaswewa	Moragaswewa	Mahawa	24 July 2009	The Rock Inscription, stone pillar yard and drip-ledged caves	
Mahachethiyagiri Vihara		Kandemedagama	Kandemedagama	Panduwasnuwara	6 July 2007	Dagaboa, Bodhigaraya, two conserved buildings temple with drip ledges, cave with letter and the archaeological remains scattered in the vicinity	
Mahaduraya tomb		Pahala Gettuwana	Mallawapitiya	Kurunegala	21 October 2010		
Makulana Raja Maha Vihara		Arampola	No. 685 Mawathagama	Mawathagama	23 February 2007	Ancient dagoba, inscriptions, ancient buildings rock surface with column base marks ancient steps rock surface with ancient pick axe marks and ruins of other buildings	
Malbaligala Devalaya		Padawigama		Galgamuwa	8 July 2005		
Maligagodella ruins		Rangallepola		Alawwa	22 November 2002	Building pillars, the natural rock with carved steps	
Maligapawwa Ruins		Dambadeniya		Narammala	6 August 1965		
Maligatenne Archaeological gardens		Rawa Ela		Polpithigama	23 January 2009	The Front yard and Meditation Hall	
Mandalarama Vihara			No. 128-Hunugallewa	Ehetuwewa	6 June 2008	The cave rock vihara	
Mangalarama Ganekanda Raja Maha Vihara			No. 343, Saliyagama	Polpithigama	6 July 2007	The image house with the paintings of the Kandyan period of all caves with dripledges and inscriptions, foot print carved in the rock, stone pillars and dagoba in the premises	
Maraluwawa drip ledged caves		Maraluwawa		Mallawapitiya	8 July 2005		
Maspotha Purana Vihara		Maspotha		Kurunegala	22 November 2002	Ancient Tempita Vihara and other ruins	
Mayuraselarama Vihara		Koradaluwa		Polgahawela	27 July 2001	Ancient image house	
Mayurawathi Purana Vihara		Kalugondiwela		Polgahawela	27 July 2001	Ancient image house	
Mayurawathi Purana Vihara		Kalugondiwela		Polgahawela	7 December 2001	Ancient Tempita Vihara	
Mayurawathi Raja Maha Vihara		Metiyagane		Narammala	27 July 2001		
Mayurawathi Raja Maha Vihara		Naoruwa Kanda		Polgahawela	27 July 2001	The dripledged cave	
Mayurawathi Sri Bodhirajarama Purana Raja Maha Vihara		Hiripathwella	Hiripathwella	Polgahawela	24 July 2009	The Tampita Viharaya, (Viharaya built on stone piles)	
Medagampola Raja Maha Vihara		Medagampola		Alawwa	7 December 2001	The ancient Buddha shrine and stone pillars	
Medagampola Raja Maha Vihara		Medagampola		Alawwa	23 February 2007	Degoba and the place with stone pillars	
Medagodawatte Uyanegama Sri Nagabodhi Purana Vihara			No. 1101 Ketawelegedara	Kuliyapitiya West	24 July 2009	The Tampita Viharaya (Viharaya built on stone piles)	
Meddepola Raja Maha Vihara Alias Meddepola Weramuna Sri Sundararamaya			No. 1569 Dhala Meddepola	Pannala	23 January 2009	The cave vihare, drip ledged caves, Discourse Hall, Buddha Bhikkus Disciplinary Hall, and Bhikkus residence	
Meddepola Raja Maha Vihara Alias Meddepola Weramuna Sri Sundararamaya			No. 1569 Dhala Meddepola	Pannala	24 July 2009	The Drip-Ledged Cave temple (Len Vihara) with Brahmi letters Sangawasaya (dwelling house) Pohoya Geya ancient Dhammasala (Preahing Hall) and drip-ledged caves	
Medigala Kalahugala ruins			No. 33-Gampala	Giribawa	6 June 2008	The ancient dagoba and drip ledged rock caves with inscriptions	
Melkandewatta (South) land ruins		Polatthapitiya		Kurunegala	8 July 2005	The drip ledged cave	
Metiyagane Ruins		Metiyagane		Narammala	27 July 2001	Ancient stone pillars at Bohena watta land	
Muruthenge Kanugala Vihara		Wattegedara		Pannala	1 November 1996	Ancient image house and paintings	
Nagahamula Devalaya			Dambadeniya South	Kurunegala	21 October 2010	The stone pillars with Ruins	
Nagolla archaeological site			No. 335 - Polpitigama	Polpithigama	23 January 2009	The Meditation Hall	
Nagolla Raja Maha Vihara		Nagolla		Kurunegala	27 July 2001	The Stupa, image house with paintings	
Nahalla Ambalama		Nahalla	No. 604, Nahalla	Rideegama	6 July 2007	Nahalla ancient Ambalama (resting place)	
Naindunawa Purana Vihara		Doraweruwa		Polpithigama	1 November 1996	Ancient image house and paintings	
Nakalagamuwa Gallen Raja Maha Vihara		Ihala Nakalagamuwa		Kurunegala	27 July 2001	Ancient Buddha shrine	
Nakkawatta Purana Tempita Vihara		Nakkawatta		Kuliyapitiya East	19 May 1967	Ancient Tempita vihara	
Nakolagane Raja Maha Vihara		Nakolagane	No. 130-Nakolagane	Ehetuwewa	6 June 2008	The ancient Buddha shrine and four caves	
Nathagane Purana Vihara		Nathagane		Maspotha	17 November 1967	Ancient ruins of monuments and the Stupa	
Nayandanawa Raja Maha Vihara		Palagama	No. 373 Agare	Polpithigama	24 July 2009	Cave Temple (Len Viharaya) and all drip-ledged caves	
Neelagiri Len Vihara		Vegolla	Katupitiya	Kurunegala	22 November 2002	Ancient cave temple	
Neluwegedara Aloka Raja Maha Vihara		Bogahamulla		Kuliyapitiya	7 December 2001	The building ruins with pillars, Stone inscription and other archaeological remaining things	
Nikapitiya Ruins		Nikapitiya	Hiripokuna	Panduwasnuwara	6 July 2007	Ancient Dagaboa mound, poya geya and the land with stone pillars in the Pansal Hena Watta	
Nikasala Aranya Senasanaya		Kanduboda	Kandemedagama	Panduwasnuwara	6 July 2007	Cave with drip ledges inscription and two ancient ponds	
Nilgiri Raja Maha Vihara		Kumbukkadawala		Polpithigama	22 November 2002	Ancient Stup, Bodhighara and the image house	
Nillakgama Ruins			Nillakgama	Galgamuwa			
Nirukthyalankara Raja Maha Vihara		Okandapola		Polgahawela	7 December 2001	Ancient image house and dwelling house	
Nirukthyalankara Raja Maha Vihara		Okandapola		Polgahawela	8 July 2005	Ancient image house, Dwelling house and Stupa	
Niyathawane Raja Maha Vihara			No. 358 - Niyathawane	Polpithigama	23 January 2009	The three drip ledged rock cave	
Niyathawane Raja Maha Vihara			No. 358 - Niyathawane	Polpithigama	24 July 2009	The ancient chaitya and drip-ledged rock caves (Gal len)	
Oluwilla ruins			Pallemorugama	Alawwa	23 January 2009	The Oluwilla rock plain with the evidence of antiques	
Oora keta Linda (Well)		Dambadeniya		Narammala	27 July 2001	At Pathahadora land	
Padeniya Raja Maha Vihara		Padeniya		Wariyapola	7 September 1979	Ancient structures	
Padeniya Raja Maha Vihara		Padeniya		Wariyapola	8 September 1967	Ancient Potgula	
Padeniya Raja Maha Vihara		Padeniya		Wariyapola	18 September 1964	Ancient Vihara complex	
Palagala Raja Maha Vihara		Palagala		Alawwa	8 July 2005	The drip ledged cave	
Palagama Raja Maha Vihara		Palagama		Alawwa	7 December 2001	Ancient Buddha shrine and ruins	
Paluwewa Weragala rock ruins			No. 32-Aliyawattunuwewa	Giribawa	6 June 2008	The stone steps on the Paluwewa Weragala natural rock and inscriptions	
Panavitiya Ambalama				Narammala			
Panda Wewa lake's ruins		Detiyamulla	No. 1,352- Ottegama	Panduwasnuwara	6 June 2008	Padawewa lake's stone outlet and ancient sluice	
Panduwasnuwara Pansal watte ruins			No. 1346-Panduwasnuwara	Panduwasnuwara	6 June 2008	The wall along the pathway, dagoba, ancient building ruins, in the site	
Panduwasnuwara Raja Maha Vihara		Ambagahawewa		Panduwasnuwara	13 March 1970	The Temple of the Tooth	
Paramaulla Vihara			Paramaulla	Alawwa	23 February 2007	Ancient Tampita Vihara	
Paranagampitiya-watta ruins		Badalathalanuwara	Bolagama	Ibbagamuwa	23 February 2007	Outer moat, inner moat and outer middle and inner wall in the land called Paranagampitiya-watta	
Paththini Devalaya, Gonatuwegedara			Kediliththawala	Kurunegala	21 October 2010	The Ancient tampita Devala Gruhaya	
Pattini Devalaya, Wilbawa		Wilbawa	No. 822 Wilbawa	Kurunegala	8 April 2009	Devale premises and its ancient buildings and other archaeological remains situated within the limits	
Penthanigoda Vihara		Penthanigoda		Narammala	27 July 2001	Ancient image house	
Pethmagayaya archaeological site			No. 603, Rambadagalla	Rideegama	6 July 2007	Four(4) inscriptions and five caves with drip ledges and other archaeological remains	
Pothuhera Purana Vihara		Pothuhera		Polgahawela	27 July 2001	Ancient image house	
Pudupulanchiya Vihara		Lassanagama	Usgala	Galgamuwa	6 June 2008	The Pudupulanchiya drip ledged rock caves, Bodhi pedestal lamp row and flight of steps on natural rock	
Puhule Sri Bebilawanarama Purana Vihara		Athuruwela		Narammala	27 July 2001	Drip ledged cave temple and slab inscription	
Rahathgal Vihara		Embalawa	No. 1206 Demataluwa	Wariyapola	23 February 2007	Ancient image house with paintings and sculptures of the Kandyan period and inscriptions	
Rajagiriya Len Vihara		Malwana	No. 1235 Malwana	Wariyapola	22 November 2002	Ancient cave temple	
Rajagiriya Len Vihara		Malwana		Wariyapola	23 February 2007	Ancient cave temple	
Rajapokuna watta ruins		Minikukula		Narammala	27 July 2001	Ancient pond and ruins	
Ranawatta Ruins		Ranawatta		Narammala	27 July 2001	Ancient drip ledged cave at Divulagahamula watta land	
Rankirimada Raja Maha Vihara		Doluwa	No. 489, Doluwa	Ibbagamuwa	6 July 2007	Cave with dripledges and the Sacred foot print carved on the rock in Dikgeya and cave with inscription in the premises	
Rathkarawita Raja Maha Vihara		Rathkarawita		Maspotha	19 May 1967	Ancient Stupa and stone inscription	
Renagama Ambalama		Renagama		Alawwa	7 December 2001	The Ambalama	
Reswehera		Sesseruwa		Galgamuwa	16 December 1949	The Buddha statue and cave inscriptions	
Ridhi Bedhi Ella Amuna		Ginihulawa	No. 1257 Ebawalapitiya	Nikaweratiya and Wariyapola	13 February 2009	The annicut called Deduru Oya Ridhi Bedhi Ella Amuna	
Ridi Vihara		Rideegama		Rideegama	11 August 1967	The rock with inscriptions and ancient cave temple	
Rukmale Vihara		Rukmale		Narammala	27 July 2001	Drip ledged caves with old paintings and the Buddha shrine	
Sagallipura Purana Vihara		Polkumbura	No. 604, Nahalla	Rideegama	6 July 2007	Five(5) cave temples with dripledges rock inscriptions and stone pillars	
Sakyamuni Vihara		Gurugoda	No. 206, Pothuwewa	Mahawa	6 July 2007	The area with the very old stone pillars	
Saliya Aranya Senasana		Galkiriyagama	No. 335-Galkiriyawa	Polpithigama	6 June 2008	The Thirty drip ledged caves with Brahmi letters	
Samara house		Nugawela	Nugawela	Alawwa	23 February 2007	The ancient house belonging to Mr. K. B. Samarakkody known as “Samara”	
Sangaraja Raja Maha Vihara		Algama		Polgahawela	8 July 2005	Ancient cave temple and dwelling house	
Sangaraja Raja Maha Vihara		Algama		Weerambugedara	23 February 2007	Avasageya and cave Temple	
Seruwagala Purana Vihara		Sewendana		Mallawapitiya	7 December 2001	Ancient image house	
Seruwagala Purana Vihara		Semendana		Weerambugedara	22 November 2002	The image house, Stupa mound, the rampart bounding the image house	
Seruwagala Purana Vihara		Semendana		Weerambugedara	8 July 2005		
Shylabimbarama Vihara		Kottepitiya		Narammala	27 July 2001	The Buddha shrine, Stupa and drip ledged caves	
Silwathtenna hill inscription			No. 1162 Mukalanyaya	Kuliyapitiya	24 July 2009	The hill inscription located in the land belonging to the National Livestock Resources Board	
Sirigala Sailathalarama Purana Vihara		Sirigala		Narammala	27 July 2001	The ancient image house	
Sirigala Sailathalarama Purana Vihara			No. 1040 - Sirigala	Narammala	23 January 2009	The ancient Buddha Shrine	
Siwurudeniya Raja Maha Vihara		Siwurudeniya		Narammala	27 July 2001	Ruins of the ancient Stupa	
Sri Alokarama Vihara		Thammita	No. 858, Thammita	Weerambugedara	23 February 2007	Ancient image house and the Chetiya	
Sri Arahatta Maliyadeva Raja Maha Vihara		Puhuriya	Morugama	Polgahawela	24 July 2009	The drip-ledged cave, the Cave Temple (Len Viharaya) and Chaitya	
Sri Bodhirukkharama Vihara		Gammatha		Polgahawela	7 December 2001	Ancient Tempita Vihara	
Sri Jayasundararama Vihara		Hondalla		Polgahawela	7 December 2001	Ancient image house	
Sri Maliyadewa Arahat Raja Maha Vihara		Kapuwarala		Alawwa	7 December 2001	The ancient stone pillars, base stones and Buddha's foot print	
Sri Nagarukkharama Vihara		Kumbukwewa		Katupotha	23 February 1967	Ancient Tempita vihara	
Sri Nagarukkharama Vihara, Katupitiya		Katupitiya		Mallawapitiya	7 December 2001	Ancient Tempita Vihara	
Sri Nagarukkharama Vihara, Katupitiya		Katupitiya		Mallawapitiya	22 November 2002	Ancient Tempita Vihara	
Sri Namalu Purana Vihara		Kadapola - Kuda Galgamuwa	Katupitiya	Kurunegala	22 November 2002	Ancient Vihara	
Sri Neelagiri Raja Maha Vihara		Kalugalla	Oaggamuwa	Maspotha	6 July 2007	Cave with drip ledges remains of dagoba on the top of the rock and the other scattered archaeological remains belonging to the premises	
Sri Pothgul Vihara		Imbulgoda		Polgahawela	7 December 2001	Ancient image house, Stupa and dwelling house	
Sri Purwarama Vihara		Dalukgolla		Nikaweratiya	19 May 1967	Ancient Tempita vihara	
Sri Pushmarama Vihara		Ihala Kadigamuwa	Ihala Kadigamuwa	Bingiriya	23 February 2007	Sri Saddarma book store	
Sri Pushparama Vihara, Ganegoda		Ganegoda	Ganegoda South	Polgahawela	24 July 2009	The ancient Image House	
Sri Pushparama Vihara, Horanepola		Horanepola		Udubaddawa	22 November 2002	The ancient Tempita Vihara	
Sri Pushparama Vihara, Indulgoda		Indulgoda		Mallawapitiya	7 December 2001	Ancient Tempita Vihara	
Sri Pushparama Vihara, Karagaswewa		Karagaswewa		Polpithigama	22 November 2002	Ancient Len Vihara with drip ledged caves	
Sri Rathanapalarama Vihara		Madahapola		Polpithigama	22 November 2002	Ancient Tempita Vihara	
Sri Samadhi Dharmayatanaya		Yogamuwakanda Belumgala	Meddelanda	Polgahawela	24 July 2009	The drip-ledged cave and the stupa in ruins	
Sri Sarananda Buddhist Centre		Kotadeniyawa Kolani	No. 1109, Kotadeniyawa	Kuliyapitiya East	30 December 2011	The ruins of building with stone pillars and rock inscriptions with Brahmi Letters	
Sri Shailathalarama Vihara			No. 381, Kurunegala City North	Kurunegala	21 October 2010	The Drip-ledge cave	
Sri Shyla Masthakarama Vihara		Medakalugamawa		Polgahawela	7 December 2001	Ancient image house	
Sri Shylabimbarama Vihara		Algama		Polgahawela	8 July 2005	Drip ledged cave	
Sri Shylathalarama Vihara		Wadawa		Alawwa	8 July 2005	The drip ledged cave and other ruins	
Sri Sudarshana Rankoth Vihara		Ganegoda		Narammala	27 July 2001	Ancient Buddha shrine	
Sri Sudarshanarama Vihara		Bopitiya		Pannala	22 November 2002	Ancient Preaching hall	
Sri Sudharashana Shailabimbarama Purana Vihara		Horawadunna	Horawadunna	Kuliyapitiya	6 July 2007	Ancient image house	
Sri Sudharmarama Purana Vihara		Bunnehepola	No. 1501 Bunnehepola	Udubaddawa	24 July 2009	The foundation of the ancient Image House and the wall	
Sri Sugatharama Vihara		Kalawana		Polgahawela	7 December 2001	Ancient Tempita Vihara	
Sri Sumanarama Vihara, Vanduragala		Vanduragala		Kurunegala	27 July 2001	The ancient image house	
Sri Sunandharama Vihara		Wathuwaththa	Wathuwaththa	Udubaddawa	6 July 2007	Tempita vihara, dageba in the poya Seema	
Sri Swarna Bimbarama Vihara		Kotuwewatta		Kurunegala	27 July 2001	Ancient Tempita Vihara	
Sri Valagamba Raja Maha Vihara		Kollure	No.923 Kollure	Polgahawela	8 July 2005	Drip ledged cave	
Sri Valagamba Raja Maha Vihara		Kollure	No. 923 Kollure	Polgahawela	24 July 2009	The two drip-ledged caves, the rock bearing symbols and other ruins	
Sri Valukarama Vihara		Arambepola		Polgahawela	27 July 2001	Ancient image house	
Sri Vidarshanarama Raja Maha Vihara		Ambalanpitiya		Kurunegala	7 December 2001	The Buddha shrine and stone pillars	
Sri Vijayasundararama Raja Maha Vihara		Aragoda	No. 925 Aragoda	Polgahawela	24 July 2009	The drip ledged cave in the land named Galagawa Hena	
Sri Vijayasundararama Raja Maha Vihara		Sapugaskanda	Hiripathwella	Polgahawela	24 July 2009	The Tampita Viharaya (Viharaya built on stone piles)	
Sri Visudharama Purana Vihara			No. 539, Katuhena	Rideegama	6 July 2007	Ancient stupa remains	
Sugathagnana Meditation Centre		Metiyagane		Narammala	27 July 2001		
Sunandarama Purana Vihara			No. 1584 Talammehera	Pannala	24 July 2009	The Tampita Image House (Image House built on stone piles)	
Swarnabimbarama Purana Vihara			No. 376, Kanoyaya Kahatavilagedera	Panduwasnuwara East	24 July 2009	The Tampita image house (Image house built on stone piles) Thjeva Mandapaya and the wall	
Tampitagoda Vihara			Galgamuwa South	Alawwa	23 February 2007	Tampita Vihara	
Thambugala Tempita Vihara		Thorayaya		Kurunegala	1 November 1996	Tempita Vihara and paintings	
Thambugala Tampita Vihara		Hogawa, Torayaya	No. 726 Hegawa	Mallawapitiya	24 July 2009	The Tampita (built on stone piles) Image house	
Thammanawa Cave Temple			No. 29-Thammanawa	Giribawa	6 June 2008	The two cave vihares, ruined dagoba and drip ledged caves with inscriptions	
Thilakarathnarama Raja Maha Vihara		Muthugala		Narammala	27 July 2001	Ancient Buddha shrine	
Thimbiripokuna Palamgala			No. 13-Thimbiripokuna	Giribawa	6 June 2008	The ancient stone bridge	
Thimbiripokuna pansal godella			No. 13-Thimbiripokuna	Giribawa	6 June 2008	The two ancient buildings and ancient dagoba with stone pillars	
Thiththawella Udamaluwa Vihara		Thiththawella		Kurunegala	7 December 2001	The Buddha shrine	
Thiththawella Udamaluwa Vihara		Thiththawella		Kurunegala	8 July 2005	The Stupa and old rampart wall	
Tomb of Vijaya		Medagama Kanda	Kandemedagama	Panduwasnuwara	6 July 2007		
Udawela Aranya Senasana		Meewewa		Narammala	27 July 2001	Drip ledged caves and paintings	
Udubadagama Vihara			No. 464, Malagamuwa	Kurunegala	21 October 2010	The Tampita Vihara	
Viharegama ancient Buddhist saṁghārāmaya (Monastery)		Viharegama		Narammala	27 July 2001	The ancient Buddhist shrine and drip ledged caves	
Viharegama Raja Maha Vihara		Viharegama		Narammala	30 August 1974	The Stupa	
Vijayasundararama Raja Maha Vihara		Dambadeniya		Narammala	9 March 1962	Ancient Buddhist shrine	
Vijayawardhanarama Vihara		Meewewa		Narammala	27 July 2001	The drip ledged cave	
Vijayawardanarama Vihara		Dahanekgama		Narammala	23 January 2009	The three drip ledged rock caves	
Vilbawa Raja Maha Vihara		Vilbawa	No. 822, Vilbawa	Kurunegala	27 July 2001	The Stupa, image house with paintings	
Vilbawa Raja Maha Vihara		Vilbawa	No. 822, Vilbawa	Kurunegala	22 November 2002	The drip ledged cave with rock inscription, Stupa mound and cave temple	
Vilbawa Raja Maha Vihara		Vilbawa	No. 822, Vilbawa	Kurunegala	21 October 2010	The drip-ledged cave with Brahmi Rock Inscription	
Vilgamuwa Purana Vihara			Vilgamuwa	Alawwa	23 February 2007	Column base and the rock surface in the premises	
Vilgamvehera Purana Vihara			Pahala Ogodapola	Rideegama	6 July 2007	Chethiya mound, Stone pillars, inscription and steps carved in the rock	
Vilgamvehera Purana Vihara		Padeniya	No.586, Mahawela	Rideegama	6 July 2007	Inscription, ancient dagebo and archaeological remains of in the vicinity belonging to Vilgam vehera ancient vihara	
Vishnu Devala, Gonnawe		Gonnawe	Panawa	Bamunakotuwa	8 April 2009	Devale Premises and its ancient buildings and other archaeological remains situated within the limits	
Vishnu Devalaya, Janthure		Janthure	No.571 Janthure	Ibbagamuwa	8 April 2009	The Janthure Sri Vishnu Devale premises and its ancient buildings and other archaeological remains situated within the limits	
Vishnu Devalaya, Kandhawala		Pallekandhawela	No. 504 Kandhawela	Ibbagamuwa	8 April 2009	The Kandhawala Sri Vishnu Devale premises and its ancient buildings and other archaeological remains	
Vishnu Devalaya, Kirindhigalle		Kirindhigalle	No.1170 Krindhigalle	Ibbagamuwa	8 April 2009	The Kirindhigalle historical Sri Vishnu Devale premises and its ancient buildings and other Archaeological remains situated within the limits	
Wadakahagala Purana Vihara			No. 166, Konwewa	Mahawa	6 July 2007	Ancient image house	
We Bemma			1053	Narammala	22 November 2002	Extend from Mr, Jamba's land to Kajulanda land	
Weda Nivasa house		Galatharaya	Galatharaya	Alawwa	23 February 2007	Ancient house known as “Weda Nivasa” belonging to Mr. L. A. Kirimudiyanse Vedamathmaya	
Wedasagiri Aranya Senasanaya		Sangappalaya	Sangappalaya	Giribawa	24 July 2009	The Cave Temple (Len Viharaya) and all drip-ledged caves	
Weheragala Vihara		Galkanda	Munigirigama	Panduwasnuwara	6 July 2007	Ancient Dagaboa mound, two ancient buildings and the pond	
Wellagala Len Vihara		Wellagala		Wariyapola	11 October 1974	Cave temple and paintings	
Weragala Purana Vihara		Weragala		Giribawa	23 January 2009	The drip ledged rock caves and the drip ledged rock cave Vihara with inscriptions	
Weragala Raja Maha Vihara			Kanduruwewa	Ehetuwewa	6 June 2008	The ruined dagoba, Buddha shrine	
Weragoda Purana Vihara		Weragoda	Ganegoda	Rideegama	6 July 2007	Chethiya mound and stone pillars	
Yahangala ruins		Hettipola		Mawathagama	22 November 2002		
Yakgirilen Purana Vihara		Seruwewa	No. 767-Seruwewa	Kurunegala	6 June 2008	The drip ledged cave with inscriptions, drip ledged cave Vihara with inscriptions	
Yakgirilen Purana Vihara		Seruwewa	No. 767-Seruwewa	Kurunegala	24 July 2009	The Cave Temple (Len Vihara) and the two drip-ledged caves	
Yapahuwa Raja Maha Vihara		Yapahuwa		Mahawa	24 May 1963	The Cave temple and paintings	
Yataththawela Bodhiwansarama Purana Vihara			No. 532 Yataththawela	Pannala	24 July 2009	The Tampita Image House (Image House built on stone piles) and Hewisi Mandapaya	
Yogamuvakanda ruins			Meddelanda	Polgahawela	24 July 2009	The rock inscription, the drains carved on the original Rock and the flight of steps No. 935 Maligatenna at Balumgalo to the east of Yogamuvakanda	
