= Meladeniya Grama Niladhari Division =

Meladeniya
- Grama Niladhari Division
- Interactive map of Meladeniya
- Coordinates: 7.553496°N 79.986820°E
- Country: Sri Lanka
- Province: North Western Province
- District: Kurunegala District
- Divisional Secretariat: Bingiriya Divisional Secretariat
- Electoral District: Kurunegala Electoral District
- Polling Division: Bingiriya Polling Division

Area
  - Total: 1.82 km^{2} (0.70 sq mi)
- Elevation: 25 m (82 ft)

Population (2012)
  - Total: 676
  - Density: 371/km^{2} (960/sq mi)
- ISO 3166 code: LK-6142230

Meladeniya

Meladeniya Grama Niladhari Division is a Grama Niladhari Division of the Bingiriya Divisional Secretariat of Kurunegala District of North Western Province, Sri Lanka. It has Grama Niladhari Division Code 1437.

Meladeniya is a surrounded by the Heenpannawa, Padiwela and Udawela Grama Niladhari Divisions.

== Demographics ==
=== Ethnicity ===
The Meladeniya Grama Niladhari Division has a Sinhalese majority (99.1%). In comparison, the Bingiriya Divisional Secretariat (which contains the Meladeniya Grama Niladhari Division) has a Sinhalese majority (96.3%)

Ethnicity in Meladeniya
1. Sinhalese (99.1%)
2. Other (0.90%)

=== Religion ===
The Meladeniya Grama Niladhari Division has a Buddhist majority (97.3%). In comparison, the Bingiriya Divisional Secretariat (which contains the Meladeniya Grama Niladhari Division) has a Buddhist majority (85.4%) and a significant Roman Catholic population (10.3%)

Religion in Meladeniya
1. Buddhist (97.3%)
2. Roman Catholic (1.90%)
3. Other (0.70%)
