= Kekunawala Grama Niladhari Division =

Kekunawala
- Grama Niladhari Division
- Interactive map of Kekunawala
- Coordinates: 7.517721°N 79.964139°E
- Country: Sri Lanka
- Province: North Western Province
- District: Kurunegala District
- Divisional Secretariat: Udubaddawa Divisional Secretariat
- Electoral District: Kurunegala Electoral District
- Polling Division: Bingiriya Polling Division

Area
  - Total: 3.07 km^{2} (1.19 sq mi)
- Elevation: 31 m (102 ft)

Population (2012)
  - Total: 1,915
  - Density: 624/km^{2} (1,620/sq mi)
- ISO 3166 code: LK-6175035

Kekunawala

Kekunawala Grama Niladhari Division is a Grama Niladhari Division of the Udubaddawa Divisional Secretariat of Kurunegala District of North Western Province, Sri Lanka. It has Grama Niladhari Division Code 1493.

Kekunawala is a surrounded by the Karandavila, Kelegedara, Pahala Mandakondana, Divurumpola, Habarawewa, Kappangamuwa and Kandayaya Grama Niladhari Divisions.

== Demographics ==
=== Ethnicity ===
The Kekunawala Grama Niladhari Division has a Moor majority (76.2%) and a significant Sinhalese population (22.7%). In comparison, the Udubaddawa Divisional Secretariat (which contains the Kekunawala Grama Niladhari Division) has a Sinhalese majority (88.5%) and a significant Moor population (10.3%)

Ethnicity in Kekunawala
1. Moor (76.2%)
2. Sinhalese (22.7%)
3. Other (1.10%)

=== Religion ===
The Kekunawala Grama Niladhari Division has a Muslim majority (76.8%) and a significant Buddhist population (22.3%). In comparison, the Udubaddawa Divisional Secretariat (which contains the Kekunawala Grama Niladhari Division) has a Buddhist majority (74.0%), a significant Roman Catholic population (14.4%) and a significant Muslim population (10.4%)

Religion in Kekunawala
1. Muslim (76.8%)
2. Buddhist (22.3%)
3. Other (0.80%)
