= Nekathi Kumbukwewa Grama Niladhari Division =

Nekathi Kumbukwewa
- Grama Niladhari Division
- Interactive map of Nekathi Kumbukwewa
- Coordinates: 7.867855°N 80.222030°E
- Country: Sri Lanka
- Province: North Western Province
- District: Kurunegala District
- Divisional Secretariat: Ambanpola Divisional Secretariat
- Electoral District: Kurunegala Electoral District
- Polling Division: Yapahuwa Polling Division

Area
  - Total: 3.72 km^{2} (1.44 sq mi)
- Elevation: 58 m (190 ft)

Population (2012)
  - Total: 650
  - Density: 175/km^{2} (450/sq mi)
- ISO 3166 code: LK-6112135

Nekathi Kumbukwewa

Nekathi Kumbukwewa Grama Niladhari Division is a Grama Niladhari Division of the Ambanpola Divisional Secretariat of Kurunegala District of North Western Province, Sri Lanka. It has Grama Niladhari Division Code 172.

Nekathi Kumbukwewa is a surrounded by the Kettapahuwa, Udagama, Waduressa, Walaliya and Palapathwala Grama Niladhari Divisions.

== Demographics ==
=== Ethnicity ===
The Nekathi Kumbukwewa Grama Niladhari Division has a Sinhalese majority (100.0%). In comparison, the Ambanpola Divisional Secretariat (which contains the Nekathi Kumbukwewa Grama Niladhari Division) has a Sinhalese majority (98.3%)

Ethnicity in Nekathi Kumbukwewa
1. Sinhalese (100.0%)
2. Other (0.00%)

=== Religion ===
The Nekathi Kumbukwewa Grama Niladhari Division has a Buddhist majority (100.0%). In comparison, the Ambanpola Divisional Secretariat (which contains the Nekathi Kumbukwewa Grama Niladhari Division) has a Buddhist majority (97.5%)

Religion in Nekathi Kumbukwewa
1. Buddhist (100.0%)
2. Other (0.00%)
