= Nikasala Aranya Senasanaya =

Nikasala Forest Hermitage
- නිකසල ආරණ්‍ය සේනාසනය
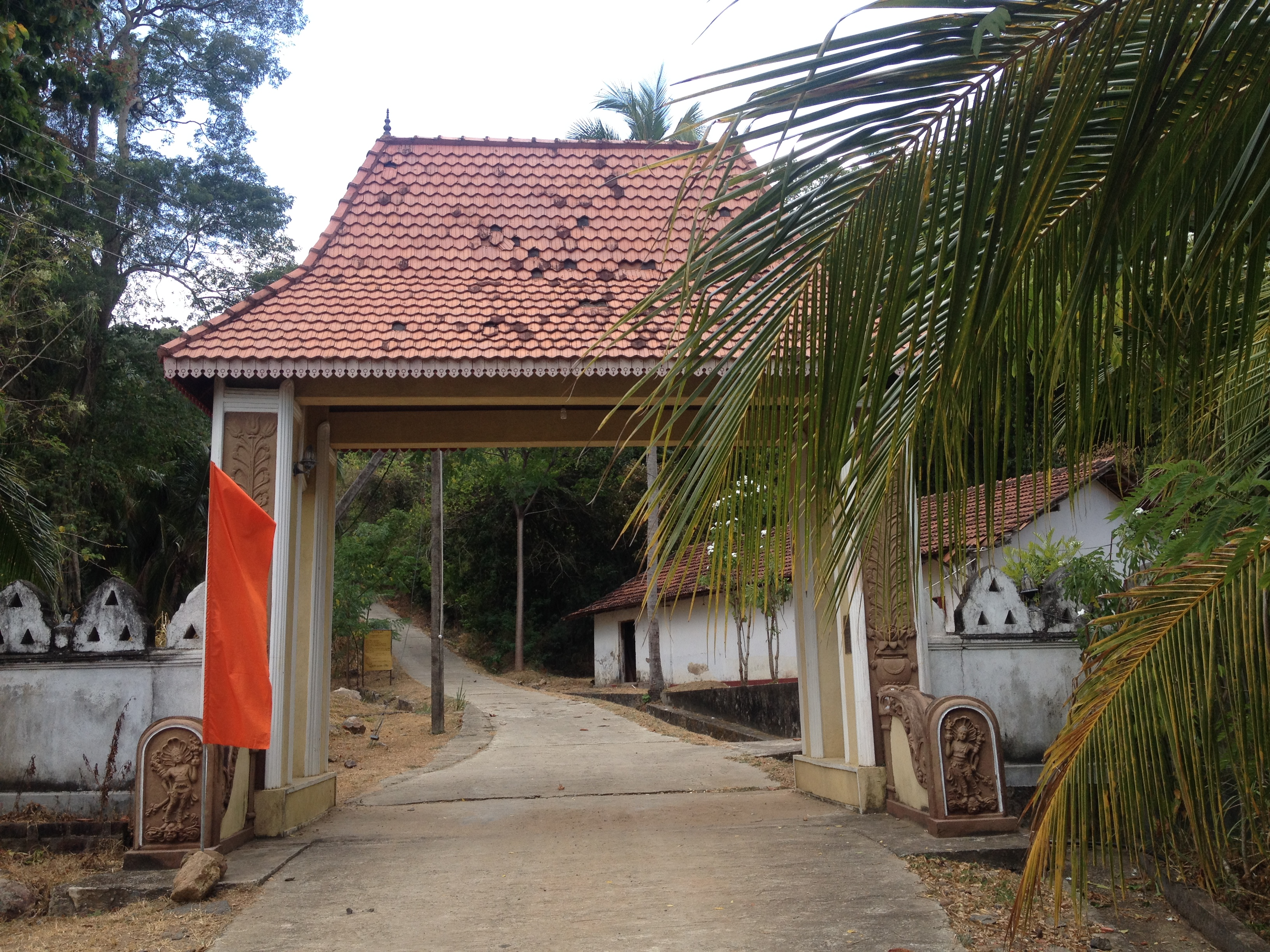
- Entrance to the Vihara

Religion
- Affiliation: Buddhism
- District: Kurunegala
- Province: North Western Province, Sri Lanka

Location
- Location: Kanduboda, Moragane, Panduwasnuwara
- Interactive map of Nikasala Forest Hermitage
- Coordinates: 07°34′40.3″N 80°07′26.9″E

Architecture
- Type: Buddhist Temple
- Style: Cave temple

Nikasala Aranya Senasanaya or Nikasala Forest Hermitage (Sinhalaː නිකසල ආරණ්‍ය සේනාසනය) is an ancient Cave temple in Panduwasnuwara DS, Sri Lanka. The temple is situated at Dematawakanda in Kanduboda-Moragane Village, about 5 km (3.1 mi) far from the ancient kingdom of Panduwasnuwara. The monastery has been formally recognised by the Government as an archaeological site in Sri Lanka. The designation was declared on 6 July 2007 under the government Gazette number 1505.

== See also ==
- Tomb of Vijaya
