= Thoranegedara =

Thoranegedara තෝරනේගෙදර தொரனெகெதர
- Village
- Interactive map of Thoranegedara තෝරනේගෙදර தொரனெகெதர
- Country: Sri Lanka
- Province: North Western Province
- District: Kurunegala District
- Electorate: Kuliyapitiya
- Time zone: UTC+5:30 (Sri Lanka Standard Time)
- Website: alihsanyouths.blogspot.com

Thoranegedara is a rural village situated in Kurunegala district in the North Western Sri Lanka. It is a multi-cultural village, which consist of both Sinhala and Muslim communities. Tamil and Sinhala are the mainly spoken languages. Farming is one of the main source of livelihood of the villagers while few people are self-employed and others own their own businesses.

== Places ==
=== Al Irshad Muslim School ===
Al Irshad Muslim School, also known as Al Irshad Muslim Vidyalaya, is a primary school situated in Thoranegedara, also a landmark of the village. There are about 150 to 200 students studying in this school from grade 1 to 5.

=== Al Irshad Jumma Mosque ===
Al Irshad Jumma Mosque is another landmark of Thoranegedara village.

== Organizations, Associations and Clubs ==
=== Al Ihsan Youth Society ===
Al Ihsan Youth Society is a registered non-profitable organization dedicated for social services. Organization was established in the year 2008 in the objective to promote education and socio economic well-being and welfare in the village.

=== Lucky Star Sports Club ===
Lucky Star Sports Club is a cricket based sports club found by youths in the village.
