= Tomb of Vijaya =

- විජය සොහොන
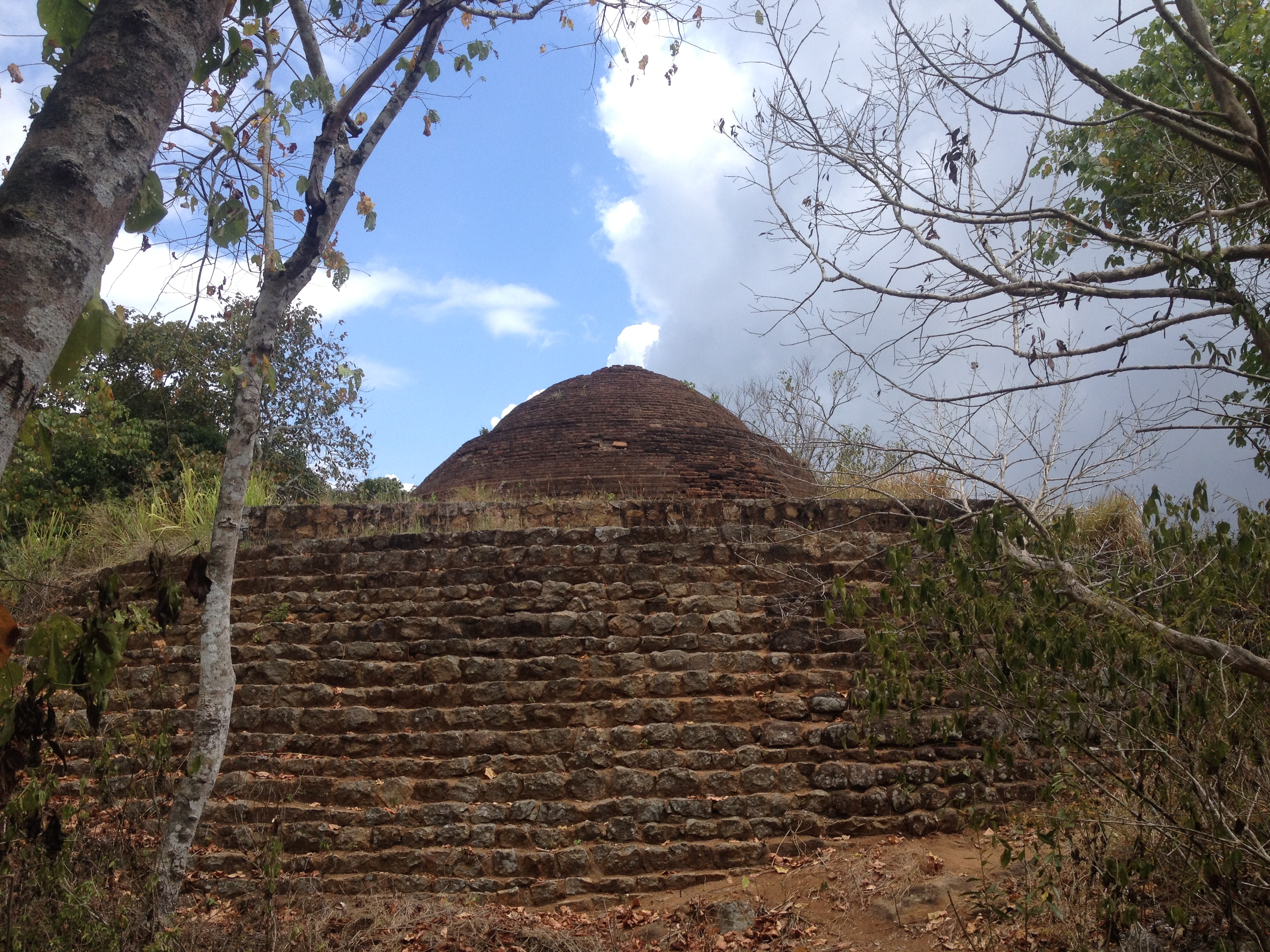
- Interactive map of the Tomb of Vijaya area

General information
- Status: Preserved
- Architectural style: Tomb
- Location: Medagama Kanda, Kanduboda, Moragane, Panduwasnuwara, Sri Lanka
- Coordinates: 07°34′27.3″N 80°07′38.5″E

Design and construction
- Designations: Archaeological protected monument (6 July 2007)

Tomb of Vijaya (Sinhala: විජය සොහොන) is an ancient monument, situated on the hillock of Medagama Kanda, Panduwasnuwara DS in Sri Lanka. The monument site consists of a stupa shaped circular structure which is traditionally believed to be the tomb of King Vijaya (543–505 BCE), the first recorded ruler of Sri Lanka. The hillock of Medagama Kanda lies about 6 km (3.7 mi) south-east of the ancient kingdom, Panduwasnuwara and is surrounded by another two historic temples, Nikasala Aranya Senasanaya and Kande Medagama Raja Maha Vihara. In 2007 the monument was formally recognised by the Government as a protected archaeological site in Sri Lanka.

The site was in a state of ruin before it was discovered by the Sri Lankan Department of Archaeology. During the excavation, archaeologists found some ashes placed inside the structure and carried out radiocarbon dating for them. In 1986, the Department of Archaeology conserved this structure as a protected monument and their investigations disclosed that the present brick monument belongs to the 10th century since the curvilinear bricks of the kot-karalla have some writing in Sinhala script from the 10th century on them.
