= Paragaswewa =

Rural village in Sri Lanka

Coordinates: 7°37′N 80°31′E

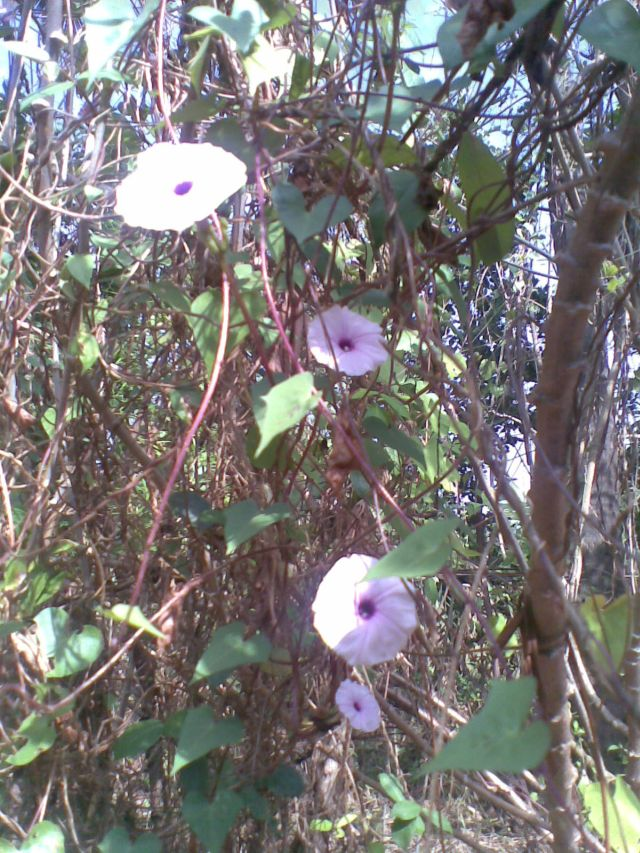
Scenery from Paragaswewa

Paragaswewa is a rural village and a fourth-order administrative division located in Kurunegala district, North Western Province of Sri Lanka. The estimated terrain elevation is 220 metres above sea level.

== Directions ==
The closest town, Melsiripura, is about three kilometers away. Paragaswewa can be reached via A6 (Ambepussa- Trincomalee) main road. To reach Pasgaswewa from the direction of Kurunegala, turn right at the 15th mile post and enter the gravel road which runs adjacent to Kumara Reataurant. Continue appropriately one-and-a-half kilometers from A6 main road.

== History ==
Written documents concerning Paragaswewa are available from 1931. According to the older generation, people migrated to this village from suburbs of Kandy during the last era of the Kingdom of Kandy (1700–1800) due to population growth.

== Population ==
Currently Paragaswewa has a population of more than 200 people belonging to 65 families. All are Sinhalese, and all are related, having common bloodlines.

== Economy ==
The economy is dependent mainly on agriculture. Most of the people are paddy growers, but there are coconut plantations as well. Increasing numbers of people are now moving to urban areas seeking employment. The village has three rural grocery stores that supply daily needs to villagers.

== Educational institutes ==
Paragaswewa village has a Buddhist temple, a government school (Sri Jinendraramaya), Udanvita Vidyalaya, two water reservoirs, paddy fields and a number of coconut plantations.

The exact geographical location of Paragaswewa is 7°37'20"N 80°30'44"E.
