= Gomugomuwa =

Gomugomuwa is a village located in Paduwasnuwara Provincial Council, Kurunegala District, Sri Lanka and is 5 km away from Kuliyapitiya Town. The Gomugomuwa area is divided into two parts, Ihala Gomugomuwa and Pahala Gomugomuwa. Coconut and rice cultivation are the main economic activities in this area.
