= Hettipola =

Hettipola හෙට්ටිපොල
- Town
- Location within Sri Lanka
- Coordinates: 7°36′21″N 80°04′29″E
- Country: Sri Lanka
- District: Kurunegala
- Time zone: UTC+5:30 (SLST)
- Postal code: 60430
- Area code: 037

Hettipola (Sinhalese language: හෙට්ටිපොල) is a town in Kurunegala District, North Western Province of Sri Lanka. It consists of 15 Grama Niladari divisions. Hettipola is connected with Colombo through Kuliyapitiya and Negombo.
