= Pandula Andagama =

Sri Lankan scholar and anthropologist (1938–2021)

Professor Pandula Andagama පණ්ඩුල ඇඳගම
- Born: Andagamage Pandula; 16 December 1938; Nivithigala, British Ceylon
- Died: 26 March 2021 (aged 82); Colombo, Sri Lanka
- Education: Karavita Maha Vidyalaya; Sivali Central College; University of Peradeniya; James Cook University
- Occupations: scholar; anthropologist; historian; vexillologist; author
- Years active: 1970–2021

Pandula Andagama (Note: His name also spelled as "Pandula Endagama" in many websites. However his birth name is Andagamage Pandula.) (16 December 1938 – 25 March 2021 as Sinhala: පණ්ඩුල ඇඳගම), was a Sri Lankan scholar, anthropologist, historian, vexillologist, and author. In a career spanned more than five decades, Andagama contributed to research on the artifacts, traditional agricultural instruments as well as culture and history of Sri Lanka.

== Life ==
Andagama was born on 16 December 1938 in the village of Tuttiripitiya in Nivithigala, Sri Lanka. His father was Andagamage Mohotti and mother was Yasohami. He had five brothers and seven sisters. His older sister took on responsibility for him when his mother died, when Andagama was four years old. Since his childhood, he had a close relationship with the village temple and took advices from Rajakeeya Panditha Henpitagedara Gnanasiha Thero.

He received his primary education from the Tuttiripitiya Kanishta Vidyalaya and then entered Karavita Maha Vidyalaya for secondary education. Later he was educated at Sivali Central College, Ratnapura for senior examination. In 1959, Pandula entered the University of Peradeniya. During this period, he was actively involved in university politics as a leftist. He received his postgraduate degree from the James Cook University in Australia.

He married fellow professor Malani Karunanayaka on 21 November 1963. She is a senior lecturer in the Department of History, University of Peradeniya. Malani was born on 5 September in 1940 to Kuruneris Karunanayaka and Waharaka Sumanawathie, both were farmers. She completed education from Narangastenna Mix School and Ruwanwella Central College. She completed her doctorate in 1973 and became a Professor in 1997. Malani was also the Secretary of the Mahavamsa Compilation Committee. The couple had four daughters.

Andagama died on 25 March 2021, at the age of 82. His remains were kept at No. 4C, 7th Lane, Pagoda Road, Nugegoda in his house. Funeral services were held on 28 March 2021 at Beddagana Public Cemetery.

== Career ==
During his time at Peradeniya, Andagama acted in stage dramas produced by Prof. Ediriweera Sarachchandra such as Wellavæhum, Elova Gihin Melova Avā, and Raththaran. After completing his degree in Anthropology, he was appointed to a first teaching post at Bandarawela Ella Maha Vidyalaya, but he refused, instead opting to work as a teacher in a pirivena in Pilimathalawa. Thereafter he served as the caretaker of the Anuradhapura Senapura Home of the Department of Probation and Child Care. Due to the pressure given from administrators of the probation center, he later applied for the post of Anthropologist in the Sinhala Encyclopedia published in a newspaper. Accordingly, he was able to write articles for the Sinhala Encyclopedia.

In 1972, Prof. Andagama was appointed as the Anthropologist in the Department of National Museums. Eventually he became the Head of the Anthropology Division, and finally the assistant director of the National Museum of Colombo from 1972 to 1991. During his tenure of 20 years, he traveled throughout the country to gather anthropological artifacts for the museum's collection. He searched for antiques in the barns and chimneys of the village houses, discovering traditional furniture such as old kitchen utensils, old furniture and farm implements, establishing an anthropological deposit in the National Museum. He did special research on mammoty and plough as there are differences between such tools from Ratnapura, Monaragala and Tissamaharama.

Meanwhile, he organized many temporary exhibitions in the National Museum and popularized the museum among the public. After He resigned from his position at the National Museum in 1990, after serving for 20 years. He authored articles for magazines, newspapers and other publications published by the Ministry of Culture and was the editor of the Government Articles on Sabaragamuwa. Under his guidance, the Anthropological Society of Sri Lanka was established and he served as its first secretary. Meanwhile, he became interested in vexillology and later co-founded the Flag Society of Sri Lanka with Prof. Nimal de Silva.

In the following years, Andagama also served as an external lecturer in many local universities. He helped to establish the National Museum of Traditional Agriculture at Gannoruwa. In 1991, he was appointed as the Director Promotion of the Central Environmental Authority in which he served for 3 years. As an author he wrote many books such as: Sūpa Shāstraya, Kauthukāgāra Athpota, Sabaragamu Vanśa Kathāva, Uva Vanśa Kathāva, and Parisarayayi Api Sævomayi. In 2010 he became the Chairman of the Arts Council of the Department of Culture and as an Advisor to the Ministry. In his late years, he was the Senior Assistant to the Sinhala Encyclopedia.
