= Galgamuwa Divisional Secretariat =

- Divisional Secretariat
- Interactive map of Galgamuwa Divisional Secretariat
- Country: Sri Lanka
- Province: North Western Province
- District: Kurunegala District
- Time zone: UTC+5:30 (Sri Lanka Standard Time)

Galgamuwa Divisional Secretariat is a Divisional Secretariat of Kurunegala District, of North Western Province, Sri Lanka. The population was 55,078 at the 2012 Sri Lankan census.

== Demography-Religion ==
Religion in Galgamuwa DS Division (2012)
1. Buddhist (91.6%)
2. Hindu (0.30%)
3. Muslim (6.30%)
4. Roman Catholic (1.10%)
5. Other Christian (0.70%)
6. Other (0.00%)
