= Bamunakotuwa Divisional Secretariat =

- Divisional Secretariat
- Country: Sri Lanka
- Province: North Western Province
- District: Kurunegala District
- Time zone: UTC+5:30 (Sri Lanka Standard Time)

Bamunakotuwa Divisional Secretariat is a Divisional Secretariat of Kurunegala District, of North Western Province, Sri Lanka.

== Demography-Religion ==
Religion in Bamunakotuwa DS Division (2012)
1. Buddhist (96.0%)
2. Hindu (0.10%)
3. Muslim (2.10%)
4. Roman Catholic (1.50%)
5. Other Christian (0.20%)
6. Other (0.00%)
