= Wariyapola Divisional Secretariat =

- Divisional Secretariat
- Interactive map of Wariyapola Divisional Secretariat
- Country: Sri Lanka
- Province: North Western Province
- District: Kurunegala District
- Time zone: UTC+5:30 (Sri Lanka Standard Time)

Wariyapola Divisional Secretariat is a Divisional Secretariat of Kurunegala District, of North Western Province, Sri Lanka.

== Demography-Religion ==
Religion in Wariyapola DS Division (2012)
1. Buddhist (96.8%)
2. Hindu (0.30%)
3. Muslim (1.40%)
4. Roman Catholic (1.20%)
5. Other Christian (0.20%)
6. Other (0.00%)
