= Mahawa Divisional Secretariat =

- Divisional Secretariat
- Country: Sri Lanka
- Province: North Western Province
- District: Kurunegala District
- Time zone: UTC+5:30 (Sri Lanka Standard Time)

Mahawa Divisional Secretariat is a Divisional Secretariat of Kurunegala District, of North Western Province, Sri Lanka.

== Demography-Religion ==
Religion in Mahawa DS Division (2012)
1. Buddhist (93.4%)
2. Hindu (0.40%)
3. Muslim (5.30%)
4. Roman Catholic (0.60%)
5. Other Christian (0.30%)
6. Other (0.00%)
