= Hatthikuchchi Museum =

Museum in Sri Lanka

Hatthikuchchi Archaeological Museum
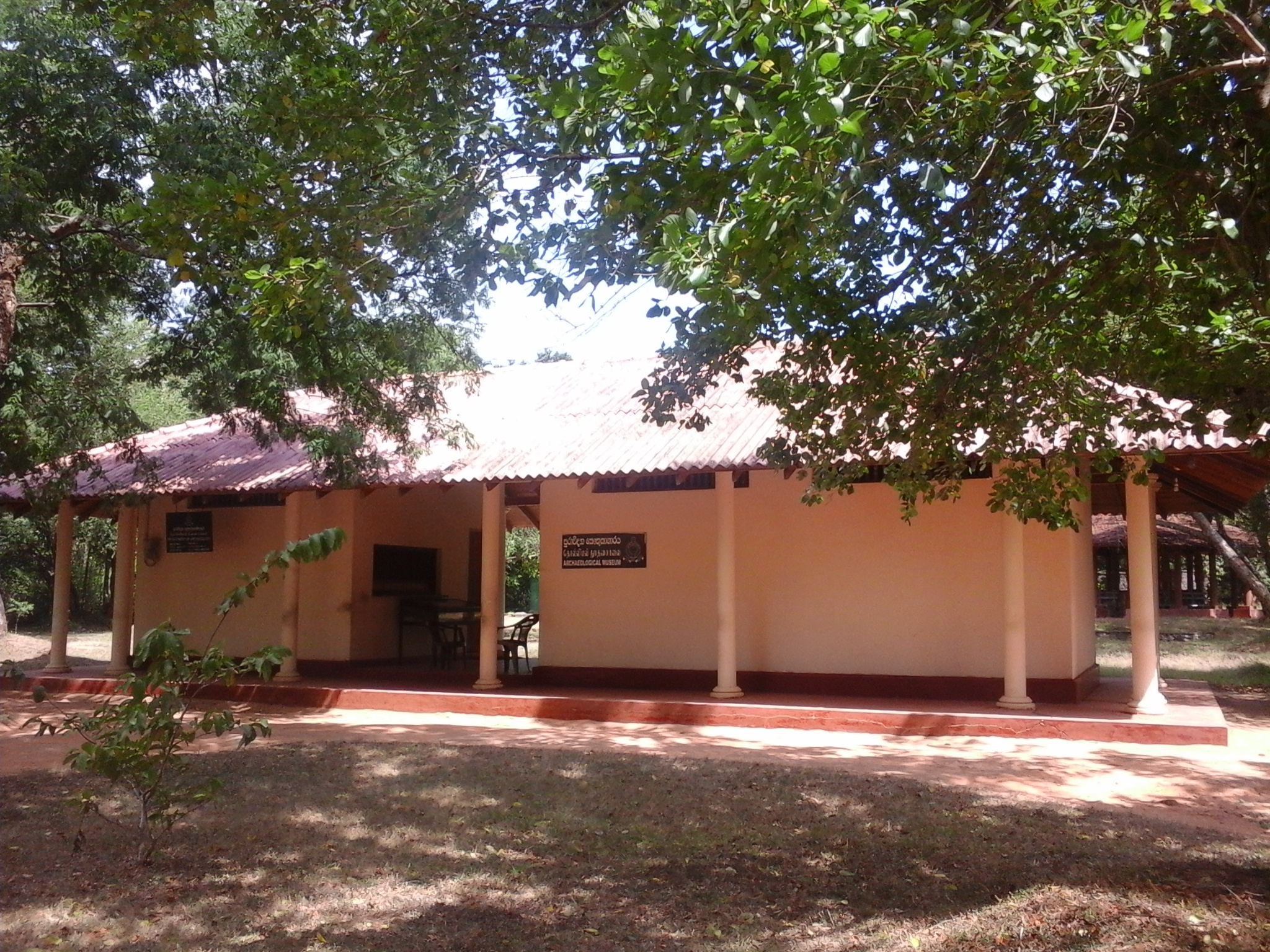
- Archaeological Museum, Hatthikuchchi
- Established: 1990
- Location: Hatthikuchchi, Sri Lanka
- Coordinates: 8°2′3″N 80°16′6″E
- Type: Archaeological
- Website: https://www.archaeology.gov.lk

Hatthikuchchi Archaeological Museum (also known as Rajanganaya Museum) is an archaeological museum in Hatthikuchchi, Sri Lanka. It has been categorised as a site museum. The museum exhibits archaeological objects found in Hatthikuchchi and the surrounding area.

The museum was built in 1990 at Tambutta, Mailewa area close to Haththikuchchi Vihara. It is maintained by the Department of Archaeology of Sri Lanka.

== See also ==
- List of museums in Sri Lanka
- Hatthikuchchi
