= Lunugala Divisional Secretariat =

- Divisional Secretariat
- Interactive map of Lunugala Divisional Secretariat
- Country: Sri Lanka
- Province: Uva Province
- District: Badulla District
- Time zone: UTC+5:30 (Sri Lanka Standard Time)

Lunugala Divisional Secretariat is a Divisional Secretariat of Badulla District, of Uva Province, Sri Lanka.

== Demography-Religion ==
Religion in Lunugala DS Division (2012)
1. Buddhist (41.4%)
2. Hindu (48.7%)
3. Muslim (4.00%)
4. Roman Catholic (4.80%)
5. Other Christian (1.20%)
6. Other (0.00%)
