= Niyagama Divisional Secretariat =

- Divisional Secretariat
- Country: Sri Lanka
- Province: Southern Province
- District: Galle District
- Time zone: UTC+5:30 (Sri Lanka Standard Time)

Niyagama Divisional Secretariat is a Divisional Secretariat of Galle District, of Southern Province, Sri Lanka.

== Demography ==
Religion in Niyagama DS Division (2012)
1. Buddhist (98.9%)
2. Hindu (0.80%)
3. Muslim (0.00%)
4. Roman Catholic (0.20%)
5. Other Christian (0.20%)
6. Other (0.00%)
