= Ibbagala Raja Maha Vihara =

Ibbagala Raja Maha Vihara (English: Ibbagala Great Royal Temple)
- ඉබ්බාගල රජ මහා විහාරය
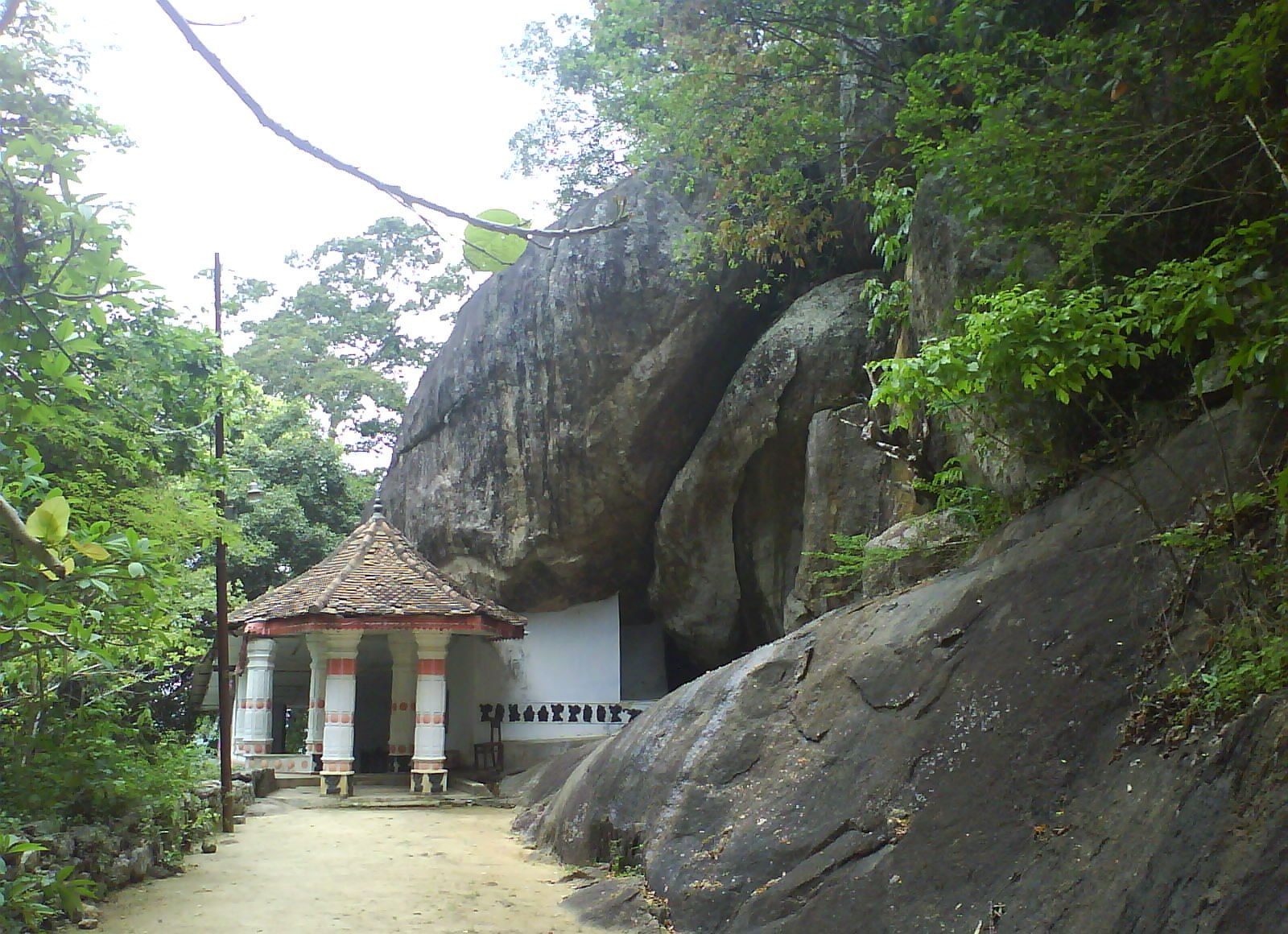

Religion
- Affiliation: Buddhism
- District: Kurunegala District
- Province: North Western Province

Location
- Location: Ibbagala, Kurunegala
- Interactive map of Ibbagala Raja Maha Vihara (English: Ibbagala Great Royal Temple)
- Coordinates: 07°29′15.1″N 80°22′14.4″E

Architecture
- Type: Buddhist Temple
- Style: Cave temple

Ibbagala Raja Maha Vihara (Sinhalaː ඉබ්බාගල රජ මහා විහාරය, English: Ibbagala Great Royal Temple) is an ancient Cave temple in Kurunegala District, Sri Lanka. The temple is situated in middle of the Kurunegala town and lies in the mid valley area of the Ethagala Rock. The temple has been formally recognised by the Government as an archaeological site in Sri Lanka. As part of the name of several temples, Raja Maha Vihara means in English: Great Royal Temple or Great Royal Monastery. It designates Buddhist temples that historically received royal patronage and/or donations from an ancient Sri Lankan king.
