= Weerambugedara Divisional Secretariat =

- Divisional Secretariat
- Interactive map of Weerambugedara Divisional Secretariat
- Country: Sri Lanka
- Province: North Western Province
- District: Kurunegala District
- Time zone: UTC+5:30 (Sri Lanka Standard Time)

Weerambugedara Divisional Secretariat is a Divisional Secretariat of Kurunegala District, of North Western Province, Sri Lanka.

== Demography-Religion ==
Religion in Weerambugedara DS Division (2012)
1. Buddhist (96.9%)
2. Hindu (0.20%)
3. Muslim (0.20%)
4. Roman Catholic (2.10%)
5. Other Christian (0.50%)
6. Other (0.00%)
