= Neluwa Divisional Secretariat =

- Divisional Secretariat
- Interactive map of Neluwa Divisional Secretariat
- Country: Sri Lanka
- Province: Southern Province
- District: Galle District
- Time zone: UTC+5:30 (Sri Lanka Standard Time)

Neluwa Divisional Secretariat is a Divisional Secretariat of Galle District, of Southern Province, Sri Lanka.

Religion in Neluwa DS Division (2012)
1. Buddhist (94.7%)
2. Hindu (3.82%)
3. Muslim (0.07%)
4. Roman Catholic (0.21%)
5. Other Christian (1.16%)
6. Other (0.01%)
