= Manmunai South West Divisional Secretariat =

- Divisional Secretariat
- Country: Sri Lanka
- Province: Eastern Province
- District: Batticaloa District
- Time zone: UTC+5:30 (Sri Lanka Standard Time)

Manmunai South West Divisional Secretariat is a Divisional Secretariat of Batticaloa District, of Eastern Province, Sri Lanka.

== Demography-Religion ==
Religion in Manmunai South West DS Division (2012)
1. Buddhist (4.20%)
2. Hindu (94.8%)
3. Muslim (0.00%)
4. Roman Catholic (0.20%)
5. Other Christian (0.70%)
6. Other (0.00%)
