= Ambanpola Divisional Secretariat =

- Divisional Secretariat
- Interactive map of Ambanpola Divisional Secretariat
- Coordinates: 7°54′20″N 80°13′28″E
- Country: Sri Lanka
- Province: North Western Province
- District: Kurunegala District
- Time zone: UTC+5:30 (Sri Lanka Standard Time)

Ambanpola Divisional Secretariat is a Divisional Secretariat of Kurunegala District, of North Western Province, Sri Lanka, which provides developmental planning to the Kurunegala District.

The stated mission of the Ambanpola Divisional Secretariat is to

"upgrade the living standard of the people through efficient, Sustainable and planned development process with people

participation and providing government services according to the government policies."

== Demography-Religion ==
Religion in Ambanpola DS Division (2012)
1. Buddhist (97.5%)
2. Hindu (0.10%)
3. Muslim (1.60%)
4. Roman Catholic (0.50%)
5. Other Christian (0.30%)
6. Other (0.00%)

== Main Services Provided ==
- Civil Registrations
- Issuance of permits and licenses
- Issuing of certificates
- Payment of pensions
- Land administration
- Samurdhi Program
- Procurements
- Social Welfare and Benefits
- Development Program
