= Kurunegala Divisional Secretariat =

- Divisional Secretariat
- Interactive map of Kurunegala Divisional Secretariat
- Country: Sri Lanka
- Province: North Western Province
- District: Kurunegala District

Population
  - Total: 80,755
- Time zone: UTC+5:30 (Sri Lanka Standard Time)

Kurunegala Divisional Secretariat is a Divisional Secretariat of Kurunegala District, of North Western Province, Sri Lanka.

== Demography-Religion ==
Religion in Kurunegala DS Division (2012)
1. Buddhist (79.4%)
2. Hindu (3.10%)
3. Muslim (11.8%)
4. Roman Catholic (3.60%)
5. Other Christian (2.10%)
6. Other (0.00%)
