= Kobeigane Divisional Secretariat =

- Divisional Secretariat
- Interactive map of Kobeigane Divisional Secretariat
- Coordinates: 7°19′26″N 80°23′49″E
- Country: Sri Lanka
- Province: North Western Province
- District: Kurunegala District

Government
  - Divisional Secretary: R. M. U. D. Rathnayake

Area
  - Total: 127.0 km^{2} (49.0 sq mi)

Population (2012)
  - Total: 35,975
- Time zone: UTC+5:30 (Sri Lanka Standard Time)
- Website: http://www.kobeigane.ds.gov.lk/

Kobeigane Divisional Secretariat (Sinhala: කොබෙයිගනේ ප්‍රාදේශීය ලේකම් කොට්ඨාශය) is a Divisional Secretariat of Kurunegala District, of North Western Province, Sri Lanka.

It is the third-level of government administration in Sri Lanka and is one of thirty divisional secretariats in the Kurunegala District. It administers 35 Grama Niladharis.

== Demography-Religion ==
Religion in Kobeigane DS Division (2012)
1. Buddhist (86.6%)
2. Hindu (0.10%)
3. Muslim (10.7%)
4. Roman Catholic (2.30%)
5. Other Christian (0.30%)
6. Other (0.00%)

The Divisional Secretary's office is located on the Rambukkana-Katupitiya Road in Kobeigane.
