= Giribawa Divisional Secretariat =

- Divisional Secretariat
- Interactive map of Giribawa Divisional Secretariat
- Country: Sri Lanka
- Province: North Western Province
- District: Kurunegala District
- Time zone: UTC+5:30 (Sri Lanka Standard Time)

Giribawa Divisional Secretariat is a Divisional Secretariat of Kurunegala District, of North Western Province, Sri Lanka. The population was 31,412 at the 2012 Sri Lankan census.

== Demography-Religion ==
Religion in Giribawa DS Division (2012)
1. Buddhist (91.2%)
2. Hindu (0.00%)
3. Muslim (8.00%)
4. Roman Catholic (0.30%)
5. Other Christian (0.50%)
6. Other (0.00%)
