= Mallawapitiya Divisional Secretariat =

- Divisional Secretariat
- Interactive map of Mallawapitiya Divisional Secretariat
- Country: Sri Lanka
- Province: North Western Province
- District: Kurunegala District
- Time zone: UTC+5:30 (Sri Lanka Standard Time)

Mallawapitiya Divisional Secretariat is a Divisional Secretariat of Kurunegala District, of North Western Province, Sri Lanka.

== Demography-Religion ==
Religion in Mallawapitiya DS Division (2012)
1. Buddhist (79.3%)
2. Hindu (1.80%)
3. Muslim (15.1%)
4. Roman Catholic (2.00%)
5. Other Christian (1.90%)
6. Other (0.00%)
