= Katupotha Divisional Secretariat =

- Divisional Secretariat
- Interactive map of Katupotha Divisional Secretariat
- Country: Sri Lanka
- Province: North Western Province
- District: Kurunegala District
- Time zone: UTC+5:30 (Sri Lanka Standard Time)

Katupotha Divisional Secretariat is a Divisional Secretariat of Kurunegala District, of North Western Province, Sri Lanka.

== Demography-Religion ==
Religion in Katupotha DS Division (2012)
1. Buddhist (95.7%)
2. Hindu (0.20%)
3. Muslim (2.30%)
4. Roman Catholic (1.70%)
5. Other Christian (0.10%)
6. Other (0.00%)
