= Maspotha Divisional Secretariat =

- Divisional Secretariat
- Interactive map of Maspotha Divisional Secretariat
- Country: Sri Lanka
- Province: North Western Province
- District: Kurunegala District
- Time zone: UTC+5:30 (Sri Lanka Standard Time)

Maspotha Divisional Secretariat is a Divisional Secretariat of Kurunegala District, of North Western Province, Sri Lanka.

== Demography-Religion ==
Religion in Maspotha DS Division (2012)
1. Buddhist (92.1%)
2. Hindu (1.00%)
3. Muslim (2.60%)
4. Roman Catholic (3.60%)
5. Other Christian (0.80%)
6. Other (0.00%)

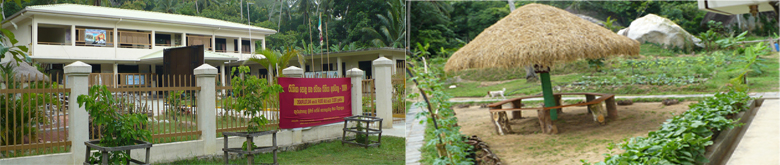
