= Narammala Divisional Secretariat =

- Divisional Secretariat
- Interactive map of Narammala Divisional Secretariat
- Country: Sri Lanka
- Province: North Western Province
- District: Kurunegala District
- Time zone: UTC+5:30 (Sri Lanka Standard Time)

Narammala Divisional Secretariat is a Divisional Secretariat of Kurunegala District, of North Western Province, Sri Lanka.

== Demography-Religion ==
Religion in Narammala DS Division (2012)
1. Buddhist (92.0%)
2. Hindu (0.60%)
3. Muslim (6.10%)
4. Roman Catholic (1.10%)
5. Other Christian (0.30%)
6. Other (0.00%)
