= Ehetuwewa Divisional Secretariat =

- Divisional Secretariat
- Interactive map of Ehetuwewa Divisional Secretariat
- Country: Sri Lanka
- Province: North Western Province
- District: Kurunegala District
- Time zone: UTC+5:30 (Sri Lanka Standard Time)

Ehetuwewa Divisional Secretariat is a Divisional Secretariat of Kurunegala District, of North Western Province, Sri Lanka. The population was 25,781 at the 2012 Sri Lankan census.

== Demography-Religion ==
Religion in Ehetuwewa DS Division (2012)
1. Buddhist (96.8%)
2. Hindu (0.00%)
3. Muslim (2.80%)
4. Roman Catholic (0.20%)
5. Other Christian (0.10%)
6. Other (0.10%)
