= Kuliyapitiya East Divisional Secretariat =

- Divisional Secretariat
- Location within Sri Lanka
- Country: Sri Lanka
- Province: North Western Province
- District: Kurunegala District
- Time zone: UTC+5:30 (Sri Lanka Standard Time)

Kuliyapitiya East Divisional Secretariat is a Divisional Secretariat of Kurunegala District, of North Western Province, Sri Lanka.

== Demography-Religion ==
Religion in Kuliyapitiya East DS Division (2012)
1. Buddhist (67.1%)
2. Hindu (0.30%)
3. Muslim (31.6%)
4. Roman Catholic (0.70%)
5. Other Christian (0.30%)
6. Other (0.00%)
