= Bingiriya Divisional Secretariat =

- Divisional Secretariat
- Interactive map of Bingiriya Divisional Secretariat
- Country: Sri Lanka
- Province: North Western Province
- District: Kurunegala District
- Time zone: UTC+5:30 (Sri Lanka Standard Time)

Bingiriya Divisional Secretariat is a Divisional Secretariat of Kurunegala District, of North Western Province, Sri Lanka.

== Demography-Religion ==
Religion in Bingiriya DS Division (2012)
1. Buddhist (85.4%)
2. Hindu (0.30%)
3. Muslim (3.10%)
4. Roman Catholic (10.3%)
5. Other Christian (0.90%)
6. Other (0.00%)
