= Hatthikucchi Viharaya =

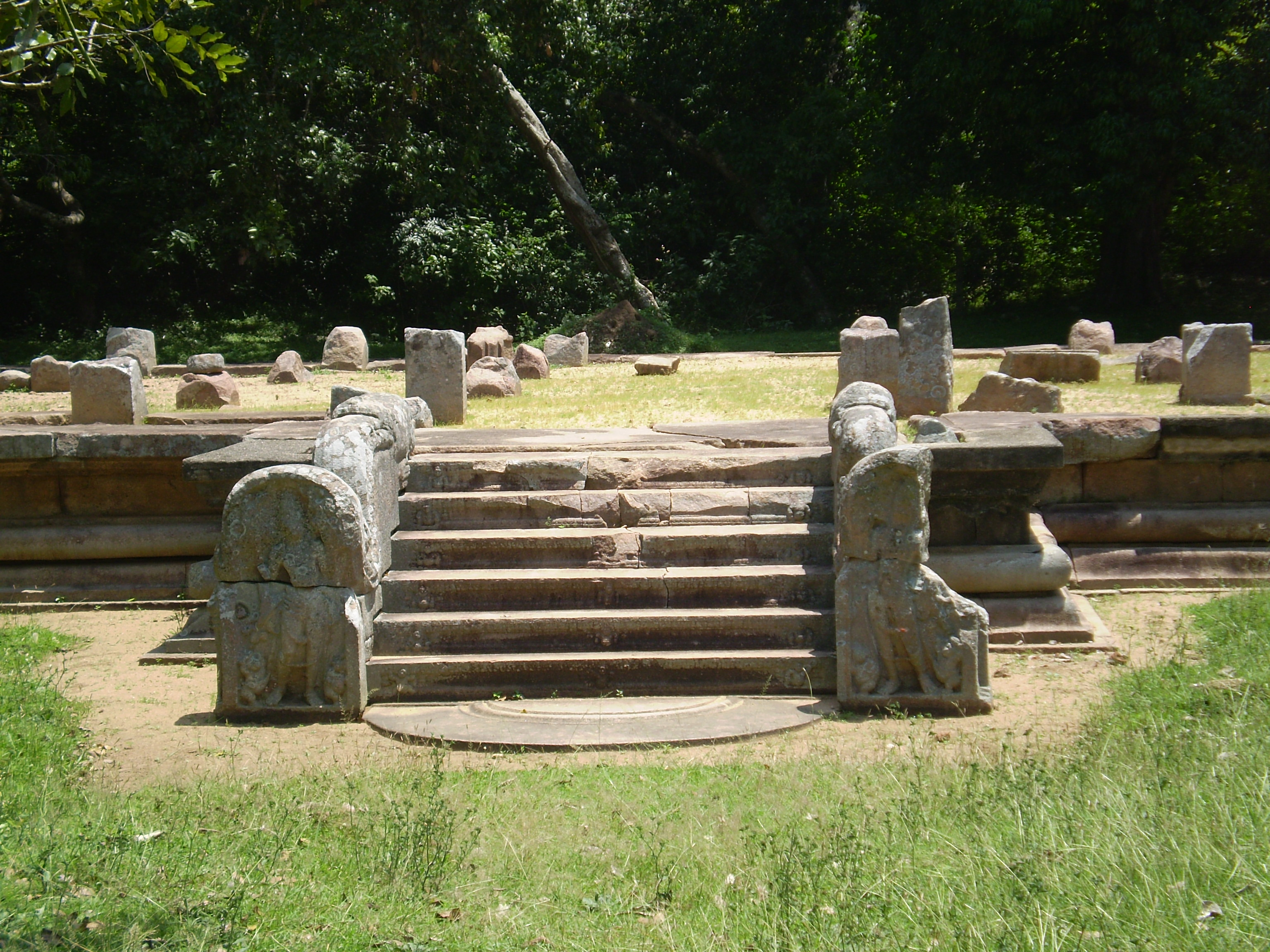
- Ruins of the Temple Complex at Hatthikucchi

- Location within Sri Lanka
- Coordinates: 8°2′3″N 80°16′6″E
- Country: Sri Lanka
- Province: North Western Province
- Time zone: UTC+05:30 (Sri Lanka Standard Time)
  - Summer (DST): UTC+6 (Summer time)

Hatthikucchi Viharaya (Sinhala: හත්ථිකුච්චි විහාරය) is a ruined ancient temple complex situated on the northern border of the North Western Province (Wayamba), Sri Lanka 3.5 km away from the Mahagalkadawala junction on the Padeniya – Anuradhapura (A28) road.

== Name ==
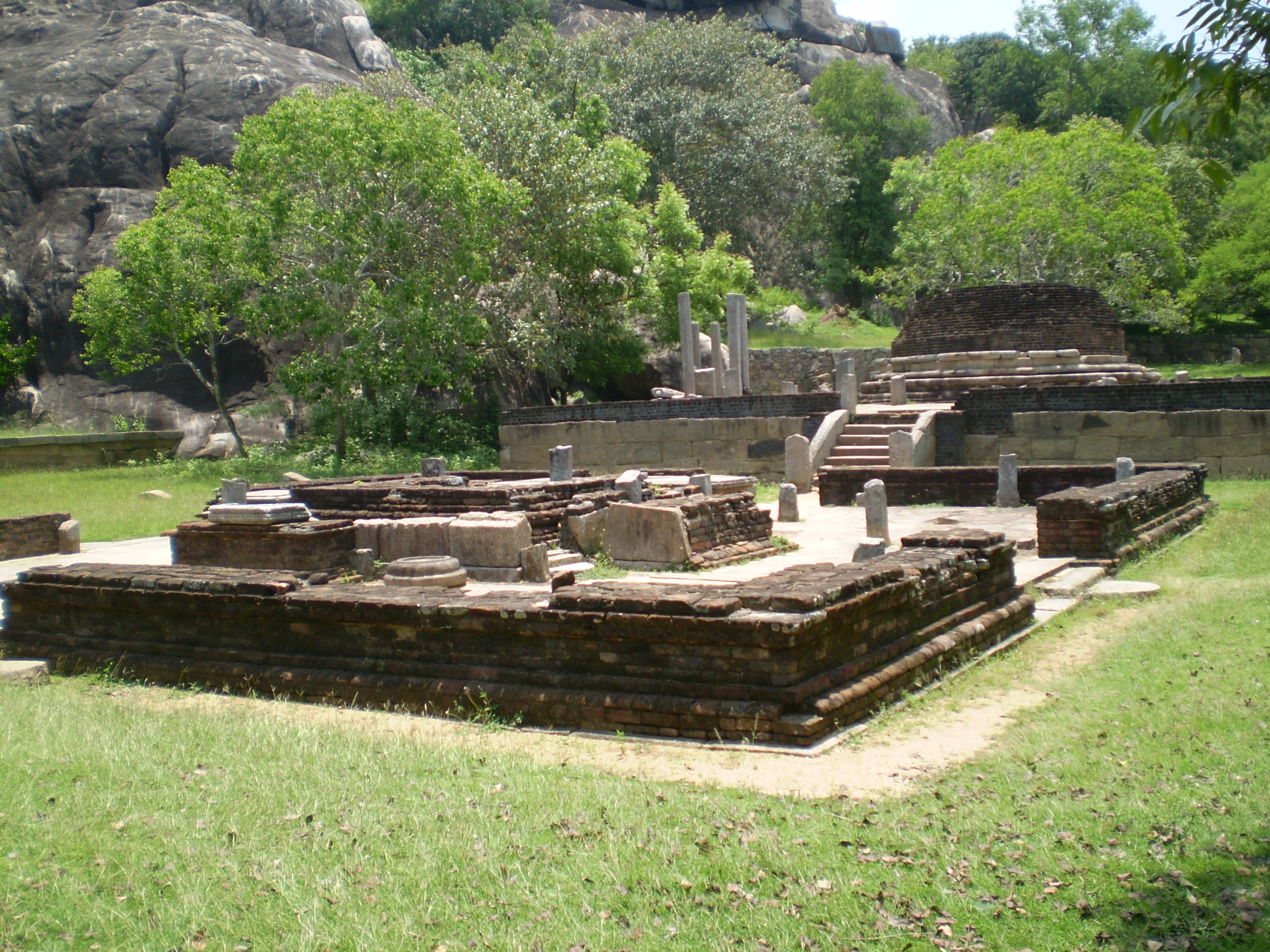
Ruined Stupa at Hatthikucchi

The name 'Hatthikucchi' (හත්ථිකුච්චි in Sinhalese) is a pali word meaning 'Elephant Stomach' (Hatthi - Elephant, Kucchi - Stomach). Its closest Sinhalese name is 'ඇත්කුස් වෙහෙර' 'Eth Kus wehera' (Eth - Elephant, Kus - Stomach). This names has been given because of a large rock inside the temple complex which resembles an elephant.

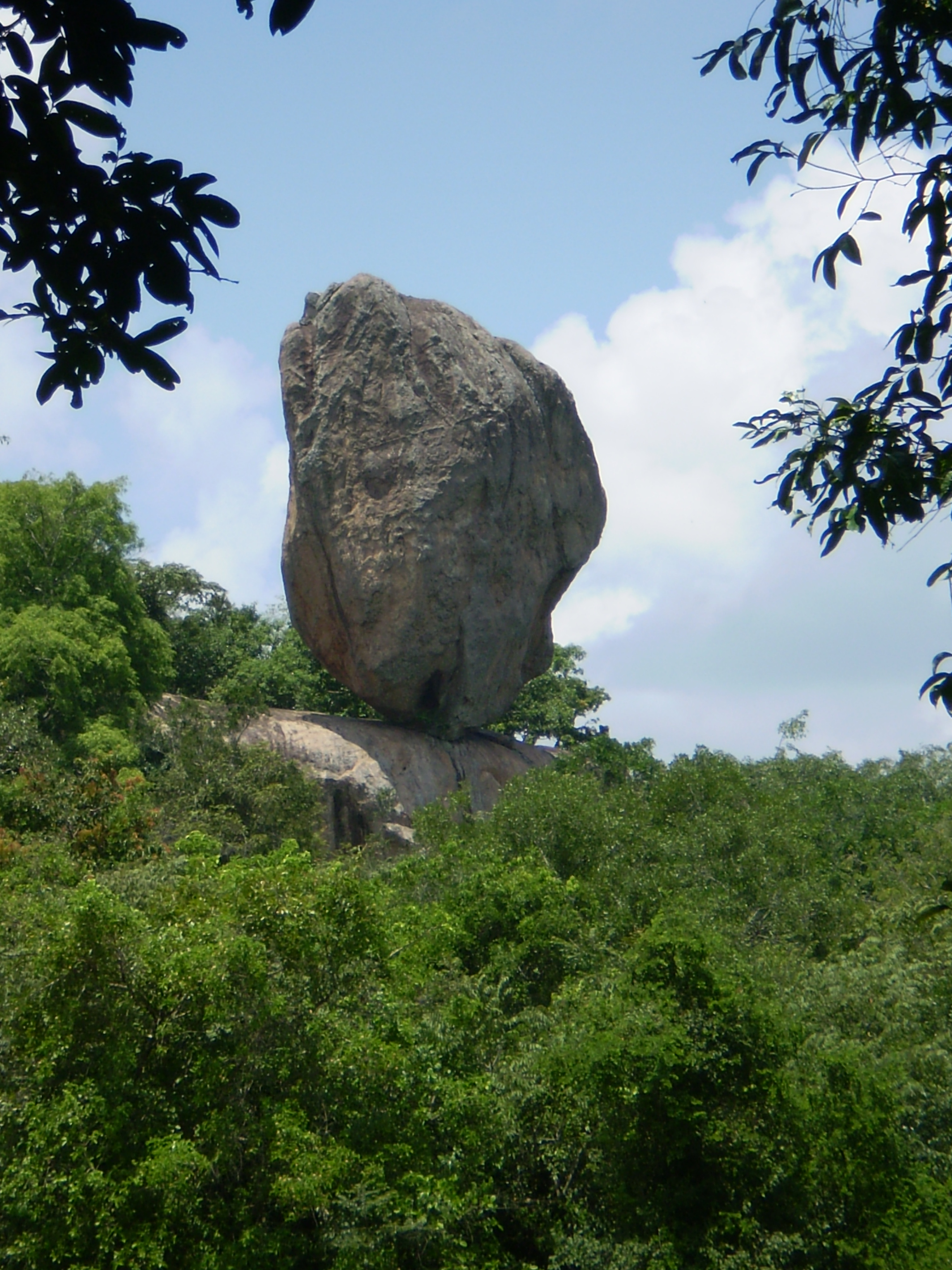
Falling Rock at Hatthikucchi. By the old road towards Anuradhapura

== History and archeology ==
The Temple complex is considered to have been built by King Devanampiyatissa (307–267 BC) and one of the oldest Buddhist temple complexes in the country. Later for various reasons this complex was forgotten and by the time of king Sirisangabo this was covered with jungle.

It has been taken into consideration that this was the location where King Sirisangabo (251–253 AD) offered his own head to a peasant. Previously it was widely considered that this incident took place at Attanagalla in Gampaha district now most scholars have raised the argument that this must be the place that it really took place.

Main reason for this idea was that, in the story it says the peasant walked half a day from Anuradhapura towards the south where he met the former king Sirisangabo. Since Hatthikucchi Viharaya is only 38.5 km from Anuradhapura rather than Attanagalla which is 170 km from Anuradhapura there is a better chance this is the actual place the incident took place.

Supporting this facts there is a tomb which is considered to have the ashes of the king Sirisangabo. In this tomb the tombstone which is built from bricks resembling a human body have a granite sphere as the head piece since it was missing in the dead body.

Excavations are still under way at the site and more ruins are yet to be found which are covered with the jungle.

== Vihara inscriptions ==
There are more than fifty rock inscriptions have been identified on the vihara rock and its base, dating from 2nd to 9th centuries AD. Among them several inscriptions, called Vaharala, mention the freeing of slaves from compulsory service.

=== Hatthikucchi rock inscription ===
Period: 2nd century AD, Script: Later Brahmi, Language: Old Sinhala
Content: "Mentions donations made for the maintenance of the chapter house at Hatthikucchi Vihara"

== See also ==
- Anuradhapura Kingdom
- Hatthikucchi Museum
