= Nivithigala Divisional Secretariat =

Nivithigala Town
- Divisional Secretariat
- Interactive map of Nivithigala Town
- Country: Sri Lanka
- Province: Sabaragamuwa Province
- District: Ratnapura District
- Time zone: UTC+5:30 (Sri Lanka Standard Time)

Nivithigala Town is a Divisional Secretariat of Ratnapura District, of Sabaragamuwa Province, Sri Lanka.

Religion in Nivithigala DS Division (2012)
1. Buddhist (81.8%)
2. Hindu (15.7%)
3. Muslim (0.90%)
4. Roman Catholic (0.90%)
5. Other Christian (0.70%)
6. Other (0.00%)
