= Kuliyapitiya =

Kuliyapitiya කුලියාපිටිය குளியாப்பிட்டி
- Town
- Location within Sri Lanka
- Coordinates: 7°28′14″N 80°2′44″E
- Country: Sri Lanka
- Province: North Western Province
- District: Kurunegala District

Population (2024)
  - Total: 5,042
- Time zone: UTC+5:30 (Sri Lanka Standard Time Zone)
- Postal code: 60200

Kuliyapitiya is a town in Kurunegala District, North Western Province, Sri Lanka. It is governed by the Kuliyapitiya Urban Council, established in 1945. It is located approximately 82 km (51 mi) northeast of Colombo and 39 km (24 mi) from Kurunegala. According to the 2024 census, it had a population of 5,042.

== History ==
The Sri Sudharmarama Viharaya, a Buddhist temple in Dandagamuwa in Kuliyapitiya, was established during the Kingdom of Anuradhapura. Kuliyapitiya was a major urban center along the Dandagamuwa Oya beginning in the early 13th century CE under the Dambadeniya and Kandy kingdoms. The Kurunegala kingdom was established in the 14th century by King Bhuvanekabahu II.

In the early 19th century, the British colonialists introduced coconut plantations in Kuliyapitiya. The Sarnath Maha Vidyalaya was established in 1882 and the Kuliyapitiya Base Hospital was established in 1917. Kuliyapitiya developed into an urban area in the mid 20th century. The establishment of the Kuliyapitiya Urban Council was declared on 15 January 1943 and it was officially established on 1 January 1945. It was declared as a Urban Development Area in 1980.

== Geography and administration ==
Kuliyapitiya is situated in Kurunegala District, in the North Western Province of Sri Lanka. It is located approximately 82 km (51 mi) northeast of Colombo and 39 km (24 mi) from Kurunegala. Spread across 277.2 km^{2} (107.0 sq mi), the Kuliyapitiya urban area is the second largest urban area in the district. It is divided into Kuliyapitiya East and Kuliyapitiya West Divisional Secretariat divisions. It is bordered by Panduwasnuwara to the north, Narammala to the east, Pannala to the south, and Udubaddawa to the west. About 52% of the land area is under agriculture, while 43% is residential.

== Demographics ==
According to the 2024 census, the Kuliyapitiya Urban Council area had a population of 5,042 inhabitants, comprising 2,417 males and 2,625 females. The Kuliyapitiya East and Kuliyapitiya West Divisional Secretariat divisions recorded populations of 61,223 and 82,587 respectively. In the Kuliyapitiya planning area, 94% of the population were Sinhalese and Buddhism (94%) was the major religion.

== Economy ==
Agriculture is a major economic activity in Kuliyapitiya with 29% of the total land area under coconut cultivation and 762 hectares (1,880 acres) (15%) of land is under paddy cultivation. The Dandagamuwa Oya serves as a major water source for agriculture. As of 2022, Kuliyapitiya produced 25 million coconuts annually. Other major economic activities included betel production, poultry farming, and animal husbandry. The Kuliyapitiya Betel Market is a major betel trading center. The Wayamba University of Sri Lanka has a facility in Kuliyapitiya.
