= Udubaddawa Divisional Secretariat =

- Divisional Secretariat
- Interactive map of Udubaddawa Divisional Secretariat
- Country: Sri Lanka
- Province: North Western Province
- District: Kurunegala District
- Time zone: UTC+5:30 (Sri Lanka Standard Time)

Udubaddawa Divisional Secretariat is a Divisional Secretariat of Kurunegala District, of North Western Province, Sri Lanka.

== Demography-Religion ==
Religion in Udubaddawa DS Division (2012)
1. Buddhist (74.0%)
2. Hindu (0.40%)
3. Muslim (10.4%)
4. Roman Catholic (14.4%)
5. Other Christian (0.90%)
6. Other (0.00%)
