= Panduwasnuwara Divisional Secretariat =

- Divisional Secretariat
- Interactive map of Panduwasnuwara Divisional Secretariat
- Country: Sri Lanka
- Province: North Western Province
- District: Kurunegala District
- Time zone: UTC+5:30 (Sri Lanka Standard Time)

Panduwasnuwara Divisional Secretariat is a Divisional Secretariat of Kurunegala District, of North Western Province, Sri Lanka.

== Demography-Religion ==
Religion in Panduwasnuwara DS Division (2012)
1. Buddhist (83.6%)
2. Hindu (0.30%)
3. Muslim (12.8%)
4. Roman Catholic (3.00%)
5. Other Christian (0.30%)
6. Other (0.00%)
