= Bingiriya Polling Division =

Bingiriya
- Polling Division
- Coordinates: 7.567982°N 79.970208°E
- Country: Sri Lanka
- Province: North Western Province, Sri Lanka
- Electoral District: Kurunegala Electoral District

Area
  - Total: 336.49 km^{2} (129.92 sq mi)

Population (2012)
  - Total: 114,580
  - Density: 341/km^{2} (880/sq mi)
- ISO 3166 code: EC-15G

The Bingiriya Polling Division is a Polling Division in the Kurunegala Electoral District, in the North Western Province, Sri Lanka.

== Presidential Election Results ==
=== Summary ===
The winner of Bingiriya has matched the final country result 6 out of 8 times. Hence, Bingiriya is a Weak Bellwether for Presidential Elections.

Year	Bingiriya	Kurunegala Electoral District	MAE %	Sri Lanka	MAE %
2019	SLPP	SLPP	1.58%	SLPP	3.48%
2015	UPFA	UPFA	0.77%	NDF	6.40%
2010	UPFA	UPFA	1.90%	UPFA	3.00%
2005	UPFA	UPFA	2.19%	UPFA	0.37%
1999	PA	PA	0.93%	PA	1.27%
1994	PA	PA	2.22%	PA	5.20%
1988	SLFP	UNP	2.51%	UNP	3.10%
1982	UNP	UNP	3.39%	UNP	2.53%
Matches/Mean MAE	6/8	7/8	1.94%	8/8	3.17%

=== 2019 Sri Lankan Presidential Election ===
Party	Bingiriya		Kurunegala Electoral District		Sri Lanka	
Party	Votes	%	Votes	%	Votes	%
SLPP	42,161	56.73%	652,278	57.90%	6,924,255	52.25%
NDF	29,247	39.35%	416,961	37.01%	5,564,239	41.99%
NMPP	1,514	2.04%	36,178	3.21%	418,553	3.16%
Other Parties (with < 1%)	1,396	1.88%	21,193	1.88%	345,452	2.61%
Valid Votes	74,318	99.36%	1,126,610	99.25%	13,252,499	98.99%
Rejected Votes	479	0.64%	8,522	0.75%	135,452	1.01%
Total Polled	74,797	83.34%	1,135,132	85.24%	13,387,951	83.71%
Registered Electors	89,746		1,331,705		15,992,568	

=== 2015 Sri Lankan Presidential Election ===
Party	Bingiriya		Kurunegala Electoral District		Sri Lanka	
Party	Votes	%	Votes	%	Votes	%
UPFA	37,574	54.28%	556,868	53.46%	5,768,090	47.58%
NDF	31,166	45.02%	476,602	45.76%	6,217,162	51.28%
Other Parties (with < 1%)	482	0.70%	8,154	0.78%	138,200	1.14%
Valid Votes	69,222	99.26%	1,041,624	99.12%	12,123,452	98.85%
Rejected Votes	517	0.74%	9,285	0.88%	140,925	1.15%
Total Polled	69,739	78.97%	1,050,909	78.82%	12,264,377	78.69%
Registered Electors	88,306		1,333,377		15,585,942	

=== 2010 Sri Lankan Presidential Election ===
Party	Bingiriya		Kurunegala Electoral District		Sri Lanka	
Party	Votes	%	Votes	%	Votes	%
UPFA	38,036	61.18%	582,784	63.08%	6,015,934	57.88%
NDF	23,273	37.43%	327,594	35.46%	4,173,185	40.15%
Other Parties (with < 1%)	865	1.39%	13,515	1.46%	204,494	1.97%
Valid Votes	62,174	99.42%	923,893	99.29%	10,393,613	99.03%
Rejected Votes	360	0.58%	6,644	0.71%	101,838	0.97%
Total Polled	62,534	75.85%	930,537	75.59%	10,495,451	66.70%
Registered Electors	82,441		1,230,966		15,734,587	

=== 2005 Sri Lankan Presidential Election ===
Party	Bingiriya		Kurunegala Electoral District		Sri Lanka	
Party	Votes	%	Votes	%	Votes	%
UPFA	30,624	50.04%	468,507	52.26%	4,887,152	50.29%
UNP	29,941	48.93%	418,809	46.72%	4,706,366	48.43%
Other Parties (with < 1%)	630	1.03%	9,181	1.02%	123,521	1.27%
Valid Votes	61,195	99.36%	896,497	99.07%	9,717,039	98.88%
Rejected Votes	394	0.64%	8,458	0.93%	109,869	1.12%
Total Polled	61,589	78.82%	904,955	77.87%	9,826,908	69.51%
Registered Electors	78,140		1,162,099		14,136,979	

=== 1999 Sri Lankan Presidential Election ===
Party	Bingiriya		Kurunegala Electoral District		Sri Lanka	
Party	Votes	%	Votes	%	Votes	%
PA	27,022	51.27%	377,483	50.77%	4,312,157	51.12%
UNP	23,876	45.30%	326,327	43.89%	3,602,748	42.71%
JVP	1,143	2.17%	27,354	3.68%	343,927	4.08%
Other Parties (with < 1%)	660	1.25%	12,355	1.66%	176,679	2.09%
Valid Votes	52,701	98.52%	743,519	97.99%	8,435,754	97.69%
Rejected Votes	789	1.48%	15,272	2.01%	199,536	2.31%
Total Polled	53,490	77.82%	758,791	75.83%	8,635,290	72.17%
Registered Electors	68,736		1,000,624		11,965,536	

=== 1994 Sri Lankan Presidential Election ===
Party	Bingiriya		Kurunegala Electoral District		Sri Lanka	
Party	Votes	%	Votes	%	Votes	%
PA	27,377	57.22%	403,838	59.36%	4,709,205	62.28%
UNP	19,915	41.63%	266,740	39.21%	2,715,283	35.91%
Other Parties (with < 1%)	550	1.15%	9,766	1.44%	137,040	1.81%
Valid Votes	47,842	99.03%	680,344	98.48%	7,561,526	98.03%
Rejected Votes	467	0.97%	10,511	1.52%	151,706	1.97%
Total Polled	48,309	79.06%	690,855	76.97%	7,713,232	69.12%
Registered Electors	61,107		897,539		11,158,880	

=== 1988 Sri Lankan Presidential Election ===
Party	Bingiriya		Kurunegala Electoral District		Sri Lanka	
Party	Votes	%	Votes	%	Votes	%
SLFP	19,275	49.90%	182,220	46.89%	2,289,857	44.95%
UNP	18,932	49.01%	198,662	51.12%	2,569,199	50.43%
SLMP	418	1.08%	7,717	1.99%	235,701	4.63%
Valid Votes	38,625	99.14%	388,599	98.91%	5,094,754	98.24%
Rejected Votes	336	0.86%	4,281	1.09%	91,499	1.76%
Total Polled	38,961	70.43%	392,880	53.49%	5,186,256	55.87%
Registered Electors	55,318		734,453		9,283,143	

=== 1982 Sri Lankan Presidential Election ===
Party	Bingiriya		Kurunegala Electoral District		Sri Lanka	
Party	Votes	%	Votes	%	Votes	%
UNP	23,479	53.17%	345,769	55.77%	3,450,815	52.93%
SLFP	19,760	44.75%	248,479	40.08%	2,546,348	39.05%
JVP	742	1.68%	21,835	3.52%	273,428	4.19%
Other Parties (with < 1%)	177	0.40%	3,895	0.63%	249,460	3.83%
Valid Votes	44,158	99.42%	619,978	99.13%	6,520,156	98.78%
Rejected Votes	257	0.58%	5,431	0.87%	80,470	1.22%
Total Polled	44,415	87.45%	625,409	86.00%	6,600,626	80.15%
Registered Electors	50,788		727,202		8,235,358	

== Parliamentary Election Results ==
=== Summary ===
The constituency is considered a bellwether for the Sri Lankan Parliamentary elections as the winning party from Bingiriya has also been the winning party in the national elections 6 out of 7 times.

Year	Bingiriya	Kurunegala Electoral District	MAE %	Sri Lanka	MAE %
2015	UPFA	UPFA	1.19%	UNP	4.05%
2010	UPFA	UPFA	3.97%	UPFA	2.42%
2004	UPFA	UPFA	1.07%	UPFA	4.82%
2001	UNP	UNP	1.78%	UNP	5.03%
2000	PA	PA	1.58%	PA	3.47%
1994	PA	PA	0.19%	PA	2.90%
1989	UNP	UNP	5.80%	UNP	5.37%
Matches/Mean MAE	6/7	6/7	2.23%	7/7	4.01%

=== 2015 Sri Lankan Parliamentary Election ===
Party	Bingiriya		Kurunegala Electoral District		Sri Lanka	
Party	Votes	%	Votes	%	Votes	%
UPFA	32,330	51.03%	474,124	49.29%	4,732,664	42.48%
UNP	29,391	46.39%	441,275	45.87%	5,098,916	45.77%
JVP	1,459	2.30%	41,077	4.27%	544,154	4.88%
Other Parties (with < 1%)	171	0.27%	5,496	0.57%	83,041	0.75%
Valid Votes	63,351	95.28%	961,972	95.39%	11,140,333	95.35%
Rejected Votes	3,110	4.68%	46,036	4.56%	516,926	4.42%
Total Polled	66,487	75.29%	1,008,459	79.63%	11,684,111	77.66%
Registered Electors	88,306		1,266,443		15,044,490	

=== 2010 Sri Lankan Parliamentary Election ===
Party	Bingiriya		Kurunegala Electoral District		Sri Lanka	
Party	Votes	%	Votes	%	Votes	%
UPFA	27,396	60.35%	429,316	63.91%	4,846,388	60.38%
UNP	16,779	36.96%	213,713	31.81%	2,357,057	29.37%
DNA	1,108	2.44%	26,440	3.94%	441,251	5.50%
Other Parties (with < 1%)	111	0.24%	2,288	0.34%	34,779	0.43%
Valid Votes	45,394	93.03%	671,757	92.58%	8,026,322	96.03%
Rejected Votes	3,350	6.87%	53,130	7.32%	581,465	6.96%
Total Polled	48,796	59.19%	725,566	59.08%	8,358,246	59.29%
Registered Electors	82,441		1,228,044		14,097,690	

=== 2004 Sri Lankan Parliamentary Election ===
Party	Bingiriya		Kurunegala Electoral District		Sri Lanka	
Party	Votes	%	Votes	%	Votes	%
UPFA	27,815	50.83%	412,157	51.95%	4,223,126	45.70%
UNP	24,120	44.07%	340,768	42.95%	3,486,792	37.73%
JHU	2,504	4.58%	37,459	4.72%	552,723	5.98%
Other Parties (with < 1%)	288	0.53%	2,976	0.38%	64,640	0.70%
Valid Votes	54,727	96.10%	793,360	95.14%	9,241,931	94.52%
Rejected Votes	2,190	3.85%	40,261	4.83%	534,452	5.47%
Total Polled	56,946	74.94%	833,908	76.54%	9,777,821	75.74%
Registered Electors	75,985		1,089,482		12,909,631	

=== 2001 Sri Lankan Parliamentary Election ===
Party	Bingiriya		Kurunegala Electoral District		Sri Lanka	
Party	Votes	%	Votes	%	Votes	%
UNP	28,297	51.37%	382,768	48.59%	4,086,026	45.62%
PA	23,510	42.68%	332,775	42.24%	3,330,815	37.19%
JVP	2,769	5.03%	63,652	8.08%	815,353	9.10%
Other Parties (with < 1%)	512	0.93%	8,533	1.08%	133,770	1.49%
Valid Votes	55,088	95.34%	787,728	95.35%	8,955,844	94.77%
Rejected Votes	2,690	4.66%	38,451	4.65%	494,009	5.23%
Total Polled	57,778	79.16%	826,179	78.98%	9,449,878	76.03%
Registered Electors	72,990		1,046,102		12,428,762	

=== 2000 Sri Lankan Parliamentary Election ===
Party	Bingiriya		Kurunegala Electoral District		Sri Lanka	
Party	Votes	%	Votes	%	Votes	%
PA	25,696	48.35%	358,794	48.75%	3,899,329	45.33%
UNP	23,852	44.88%	308,106	41.86%	3,451,765	40.12%
JVP	1,807	3.40%	40,780	5.54%	518,725	6.03%
Other Parties (with < 1%)	926	1.74%	16,421	2.23%	221,514	2.57%
NUA	860	1.62%	11,927	1.62%	185,593	2.16%
Valid Votes	53,141	N/A	736,028	N/A	8,602,617	N/A

=== 1994 Sri Lankan Parliamentary Election ===
Party	Bingiriya		Kurunegala Electoral District		Sri Lanka	
Party	Votes	%	Votes	%	Votes	%
PA	25,709	51.83%	366,856	51.87%	3,887,805	48.94%
UNP	23,502	47.38%	332,547	47.02%	3,498,370	44.04%
Other Parties (with < 1%)	391	0.79%	7,876	1.11%	158,616	2.00%
Valid Votes	49,602	97.18%	707,279	95.92%	7,943,688	95.20%
Rejected Votes	1,441	2.82%	30,071	4.08%	400,395	4.80%
Total Polled	51,043	83.53%	737,350	82.15%	8,344,095	74.75%
Registered Electors	61,107		897,580		11,163,064	

=== 1989 Sri Lankan Parliamentary Election ===
Party	Bingiriya		Kurunegala Electoral District		Sri Lanka	
Party	Votes	%	Votes	%	Votes	%
UNP	22,496	53.49%	314,724	58.51%	2,838,005	50.71%
SLFP	18,535	44.07%	195,526	36.35%	1,785,369	31.90%
ELJP	714	1.70%	13,759	2.56%	67,723	1.21%
Other Parties (with < 1%)	312	0.74%	13,907	2.59%	232,463	4.15%
Valid Votes	42,057	96.36%	537,916	94.02%	5,596,468	93.87%
Rejected Votes	1,589	3.64%	34,212	5.98%	365,563	6.13%
Total Polled	43,646	80.05%	572,128	72.88%	5,962,031	63.60%
Registered Electors	54,522		784,991		9,374,164	

== Demographics ==
=== Ethnicity ===
The Bingiriya Polling Division has a Sinhalese majority (92.7%) . In comparison, the Kurunegala Electoral District (which contains the Bingiriya Polling Division) has a Sinhalese majority (91.4%)

Ethnicity in Bingiriya
1. Sinhalese (92.7%)
2. Moor (6.40%)
3. Other (0.90%)

=== Religion ===
The Bingiriya Polling Division has a Buddhist majority (80.2%) and a significant Roman Catholic population (12.1%) . In comparison, the Kurunegala Electoral District (which contains the Bingiriya Polling Division) has a Buddhist majority (88.5%)

Religion in Bingiriya
1. Buddhist (80.2%)
2. Roman Catholic (12.1%)
3. Muslim (6.40%)
4. Other (1.20%)
