= Divisional secretariats of Sri Lanka =

Third-level administrative divisions of Sri Lanka

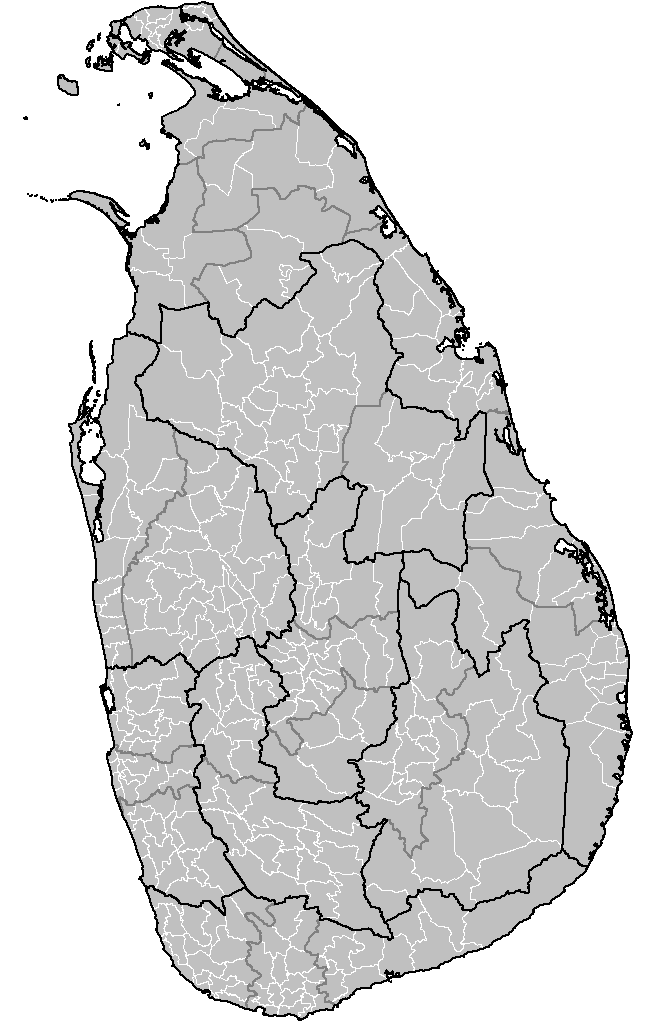
Provinces (black) are divided into districts (grey), which are further divided into divisional secretariats (white). These are then further divided into Grama Niladharis (not marked on the map).

The districts of Sri Lanka are further divided into administrative sub-units known as divisional secretariats (Sinhala: ප්‍රාදේශීය ලේකම් කොට්ඨාස, romanized: Prādēśīya lēkam koṭṭhāsa ; Tamil: பிரதேச செயலகங்கள், romanized: Piratēca ceyalakaṅkaḷ). They were originally based on the feudal counties, the korales and ratas. Divisional secretariats are the third-level administrative divisions of the country and there are currently 331 divisional secretariats in Sri Lanka.

They were formerly known as D.R.O. divisions, after the divisional revenue officer. Later the D.R.O.s became assistant government agents and the divisions were known as A.G.A. divisions. Currently, the divisions are administered by a divisional secretary, and are known as D.S. divisions.

== History ==
Divisional Secretariats in Sri Lanka were formerly known as D.R.O. divisions, named after the Divisional Revenue Officers, who were responsible for revenue collection and administrative matters. The D.R.O. system was a continuation of the colonial administration model used by the British, who divided the country into administrative units to ensure efficient tax collection and governance.

Following Sri Lanka’s independence in 1948, the government introduced the Assistant Government Agent (A.G.A.) system, replacing the D.R.O. divisions. A.G.A.s were responsible for regional administration and worked under the authority of the Government Agent (G.A.) at the district level.

In 1992, as part of decentralization efforts, A.G.A. divisions were renamed as Divisional Secretariats. The role of Divisional Secretaries expanded beyond revenue collection to include functions such as:

- Development Planning – Overseeing economic and social development projects.
- Public Service Delivery – Coordinating services such as issuing identity documents and land administration.
- Disaster Management – Responding to emergencies and coordinating relief efforts.

Today, there are 331 Divisional Secretariats across Sri Lanka, each managed by a Divisional Secretary appointed by the central government. Their functions continue to evolve in response to governance needs and development priorities.

== Administrative Structure of Divisional Secretariats in Sri Lanka ==
=== Divisional Secretary ===
A Divisional Secretary is the chief administrative officer of a Divisional Secretariat and is appointed by the central government. The Divisional Secretary is responsible for implementing government policies, managing public services, and ensuring the administration of development projects at the divisional level.

Key Responsibilities:

- Administrative Functions: Implementation of government policies, development programs, and coordination of public services.
- Regulatory and Legal Responsibilities: Oversight of land administration, birth and death registration, and issuing permits.
- Coordination Role: Acts as an intermediary between the Central Government, Provincial Councils, and local authorities, ensuring smooth governance.

=== Divisional Councils (Pradeshiya Sabhas) and Their Leadership ===
Divisional Councils, known as Pradeshiya Sabhas, function as local government bodies overseeing the administration of their respective Divisional Secretariat areas. These councils derive their powers from multiple Acts and Ordinances, including:

- Municipal Council Ordinance No. 29 of 1947
- Urban Councils Ordinance No. 61 of 1939
- Pradeshiya Sabha Act No. 15 of 1987

Unlike Urban and Municipal Councils, Divisional Councils have limited legislative and executive powers, as their authority is subordinate to both the Central Government and Provincial Councils. Additionally, state institutions such as the District Secretary also exercise powers similar to local authorities.

==== Chairman and Deputy Chairman of Divisional Councils ====
Each Divisional Council is led by an elected Chairman and a Deputy Chairman, both chosen from the council members.

===== Chairman =====
- Presides over council meetings.
- Oversees the implementation of council decisions.
- Represents the council in official matters.
- Serves as a Justice of the Peace and Unofficial Magistrate for the district.
- Has limited executive powers compared to Municipal Council mayors.

===== Deputy Chairman =====
- Assists the Chairman in executing council decisions.
- Presides over council meetings in the Chairman's absence.
- Ensures continuity of governance and service delivery.

=== Powers and Functions of Divisional Councils ===
Divisional Councils have legal authority to:

- Initiate legal action against violators of local ordinances.

== Divisional secretariats ==
The 331 divisions are listed below, by district:

Province	#	District	#	Divisional secretariats (number of further subdivisions/Grama Niladharis under the divisional secretariat, are shown in parentheses)
Central	36	Kandy	20	Akurana; Delthota; Doluwa; Gangawata Korale; Ganga Ihala Korale; Harispattuwa; Hatharaliyadda; Kundasale; Medadumbara; Minipe; Panvila; Pasbage Korale; Pathadumbara; Pathahewaheta; Poojapitiya; Thumpane; Udadumbara; Udapalatha; Udunuwara; Yatinuwara
Central	36	Matale	11	Ambanganga Korale; Dambulla; Galewela; Laggala-Pallegama; Matale; Naula; Pallepola; Rattota; Ukuwela; Wilgamuwa; Yatawatta
Central	36	Nuwara Eliya	10	Ambagamuwa; Hanguranketha; Kothmale; Nuwara Eliya; Walapane; Norwood; Kothmale West; Nildandahinna; Thalawakale; Mathurata
Eastern	45	Ampara	20	Addalachchenai; Akkaraipattu; Alayadiwembu; Ampara; Damana; Dehiattakandiya; Eragama; Kalmunai Muslim; Kalmunai Tamil; Karaitivu; Lahugala; Mahaoya; Navithanveli; Ninthavur; Padiyathalawa; Pothuvil; Sainthamarathu; Samanthurai; Thirukkovil; Uhana
Eastern	45	Batticaloa	14	Eravur Pattu; Eravur Town; Kattankudy; Koralai Pattu; Koralai Pattu Central; Koralai Pattu North; Koralai Pattu South; Koralai Pattu West; Manmunai North; Manmunai Pattu; Manmunai S. and Eruvil Pattu; Manmunai South West; Manmunai West; Porativu Pattu
Eastern	45	Trincomalee	11	Gomarankadawala; Kantalai; Kinniya; Kuchchaveli; Morawewa; Muttur; Padavi Sri Pura; Seruvila; Thambalagamuwa; Trincomalee; Verugal
North Central	29	Anuradhapura	22	Galnewa (30); Galenbindunuwewa (41); Horowpothana (38); Ipalogama (32); Kahatagasdigiliya (40); Kebithigollewa (26); Kekirawa (53); Mahavilachchiya (17); Medawachchiya (37); Mihinthale (25); Nachchadoowa (19); Nochchiyagama (36); Nuwaragam Palatha Central (40); Nuwaragam Palatha East (29); Padaviya (15); Palagala (35); Palugaswewa (16); Rajanganaya (21); Rambewa (38); Thalawa (39); Thambuttegama (26); Thirappane (41)
North Central	29	Polonnaruwa	7	Dimbulagala; Elahera; Hingurakgoda; Lankapura; Medirigiriya; Thamankaduwa; Welikanda
Northern	34	Jaffna	15	Delft; Island North; Island South; Jaffna; Karainagar; Nallur; Thenmaradchi; Vadamaradchi East; Vadamaradchi North; Vadamaradchi South-West; Valikamam East; Valikamam North; Valikamam South; Valikamam South-West; Valikamam West
Northern	34	Kilinochchi	4	Kandavalai; Karachchi; Pachchilaipalli; Poonakary
Northern	34	Mannar	5	Madhu; Mannar; Manthai West; Musalai; Nanaddan
Northern	34	Mullaitivu	6	Manthai East; Maritimepattu; Oddusuddan; Puthukudiyiruppu; Thunukkai; Welioya
Northern	34	Vavuniya	4	Vavuniya; Vavuniya North; Vavuniya South; Vengalacheddikulam
North Western	46	Kurunegala	30	Alawwa; Ambanpola; Bamunakotuwa; Bingiriya; Ehetuwewa; Galgamuwa; Ganewatta; Giribawa; Ibbagamuwa; Katupotha; Kobeigane; Kotavehera; Kuliyapitiya East; Kuliyapitiya West; Kurunegala; Mahawa; Mallawapitiya; Maspotha; Mawathagama; Narammala; Nikaweratiya; Panduwasnuwara; Pannala; Polgahawela; Polpithigama; Rasnayakapura; Rideegama; Udubaddawa; Wariyapola; Weerambugedara
North Western	46	Puttalam	16	Anamaduwa; Arachchikattuwa; Chilaw; Dankotuwa; Kalpitiya; Karuwalagaswewa; Madampe; Mahakumbukkadawala; Mahawewa; Mundalama; Nattandiya; Nawagattegama; Pallama; Puttalam; Vanathavilluwa; Wennappuwa
Sabaragamuwa	28	Kegalle	11	Aranayaka; Bulathkohupitiya; Dehiovita; Deraniyagala; Galigamuwa; Kegalle; Mawanella; Rambukkana; Ruwanwella; Warakapola; Yatiyanthota
Sabaragamuwa	28	Ratnapura	17	Ayagama; Balangoda; Eheliyagoda; Elapattha; Embilipitiya; Godakawela; Imbulpe; Kahawatta; Kalawana; Kiriella; Kolonna; Kuruvita; Nivithigala; Opanayaka; Pelmadulla; Ratnapura; Weligepola
Southern	47	Galle	19	Akmeemana; Ambalangoda; Baddegama; Balapitiya; Benthota; Bope-Poddala; Elpitiya; Galle; Gonapinuwala; Habaraduwa; Hikkaduwa; Imaduwa; Karandeniya; Nagoda; Neluwa; Niyagama; Thawalama; Welivitiya-Divithura; Yakkalamulla
Southern	47	Hambantota	12	Ambalantota; Angunakolapelessa; Beliatta; Hambantota; Katuwana; Lunugamvehera; Okewela; Sooriyawewa; Tangalle; Thissamaharama; Walasmulla; Weeraketiya
Southern	47	Matara	16	Akuressa; Athuraliya; Devinuwara; Dickwella; Hakmana; Kamburupitiya; Kirinda Puhulwella; Kotapola; Malimbada; Matara; Mulatiyana; Pasgoda; Pitabeddara; Thihagoda; Weligama; Welipitiya
Uva	26	Badulla	15	Badulla; Bandarawela; Ella; Haldummulla; Hali-Ela; Haputale; Kandaketiya; Lunugala; Mahiyanganaya; Meegahakivula; Passara; Rideemaliyadda; Soranathota; Uva-Paranagama; Welimada
Uva	26	Moneragala	11	Badalkumbura; Bibile; Buttala; Katharagama; Madulla; Medagama; Moneragala; Sevanagala; Siyambalanduwa; Thanamalvila; Wellawaya
Western	40	Colombo	13	Colombo (35); Dehiwala (15); Homagama (81); Kaduwela (57); Kesbewa (73); Kolonnawa (46); Kotte (20); Maharagama (41); Moratuwa (42); Padukka (46); Ratmalana (13); Seethawaka (68); Thimbirigasyaya (29)
Western	40	Gampaha	13	Attanagalla; Biyagama; Divulapitiya; Dompe; Gampaha; Ja-Ela; Katana; Kelaniya; Mahara; Minuwangoda; Mirigama; Negombo; Wattala
Western	40	Kalutara	14	Agalawatta; Bandaragama; Beruwala; Bulathsinhala; Dodangoda; Horana; Ingiriya; Kalutara; Madurawela; Mathugama; Millaniya; Palindanuwara; Panadura; Walallavita

== See also ==
- Provinces of Sri Lanka
- Districts of Sri Lanka
