= Kurunegala District =

Kurunegala District කුරුණෑගල දිස්ත්‍රික්කය குருநாகல் மாவட்டம்
- Administrative District
- Map of Sri Lanka with Kurunegala District highlighted
- Coordinates: 7°45′N 80°15′E
- Country: Sri Lanka
- Province: North Western Province
- Largest City: Kurunegala

Government
  - District Secretary: R. M. R. Rathnayake

Area
  - Total: 4,816 km^{2} (1,859 sq mi)

Population (2012)
  - Total: 1,610,299
  - Density: 334.4/km^{2} (866.0/sq mi)
- Time zone: UTC+05:30 (Sri Lanka)
- ISO 3166 code: LK-61

Kurunegala is a district in North Western Province, Sri Lanka. The district is 4,812.7 km^{2} (1,858.2 sq mi). It consists of thirty divisional secretariats, 1,610 grama niladari divisions and 4,476 villages. It has fourteen electoral divisions, two municipal councils, nineteen urban councils, fifteen members of parliament, 47 provincial council members, fifteen ministers and 337 local council members.

== Geography ==
Kurunegala District is bounded by six districts, to the north the Anuradhapura District, the east by the Matale and Kandy Districts, south by the Gampaha and Kegalle Districts and to the west by the Puttalam District.

== History ==
Kurunegala consists of four ancient kingdoms namely Panduwasnuwara, Kurunegala, Yapahuwa and Dambadeniya.

== Demographic details ==
Kurunegala District has 7.3% of the country's total population. According to the census data, the estimated population of Kurunegala in the year 2001 was 1.4 million. The majority of the district's population belong to the Sinhalese majority. Other ethnic minorities include the Sri Lankan Moors, Sri Lankan Tamils, Burghers and Malays. Residents from ethnic minorities live in all parts of the District.

The following Table summarizes the population of Kurunegala according to their ethnicity:

Ethnicity in Kurunegala District (2024)
1. Sinhala (90.6%)
2. Sri Lankan Moors (7.97%)
3. Sri Lankan Tamils (1.23%)
4. Others (0.20%)

Ethnicity	Percentage
Sinhalese	91.9%
Sri Lankan Moors	8.3%
Sri Lankan Tamil	2.1%
Indian Tamil	0.2%

=== Language ===
The common languages of Kurunegala, depending on social classes, social circles, and ethnic backgrounds are Sinhalese, Tamil and English.

=== Religion ===
Religion in Kurunegala district (2024)
Religion	Percent
Buddhism	88.09%
Islam	8.10%
Catholicism	2.28%
Hinduism	0.99%
Other Christianity	0.53%
Other or not stated	0.01%

Buddhism is the main and the most widely practised religion in Kurunegala. The district is also home to a wide range of other religious faiths and sects including Islam, Christianity and Hinduism.

Churches, mosques and Hindu temples are also located in the district. The Church of Ceylon, which is the Anglican Church in Sri Lanka operates a diocese in Kurunegala covering the North-Central province and Kurunegala, Kandy, Matale and Kegalle, Anuradapura, Polonnaruwa districts.

Religion	Population(2012)
Buddhism	1,431,632
Islam	118,305
Christianity	53,637
Hinduism	14,721
Other Religion	170

== Education ==
The district has six Educational Zones, 869 Schools including 28 National Schools, and 20,006 Teachers.

== Climate ==
Kurunegala features a tropical rainforest climate under the Köppen climate classification. The city's climate is tropical and hot all throughout the year. The surrounding rocks play a major role in determining Kurunegala's weather since these rocks increase and retain the heat of the day. During the month of April the temperature can rise up to about 35 °C (95 °F). The only major change in the Kurunegala weather occurs during the monsoons from May to August and October to January, this is the time of year where heavy rains can be expected. While the city does experience a noticeably drier weather during January and February, it does not qualify as a true dry season as average precipitation in both months are above 60 millimetres (2 in). In general, temperatures from late November to mid February period are lower than the rest of the year. Middle rainfall of this District is 900 - 2200 ml. North East Monsoon and South West Monsoon are the main rainfall method in this district. South West Monsoon is the largest rainfall system.

The average annual rainfall in Kurunegala is about 2,000 millimetres (79 in).

Climate data for Kurunegala, Sri Lanka (1961-1990)
Month	Jan	Feb	Mar	Apr	May	Jun	Jul	Aug	Sep	Oct	Nov	Dec	Year
Record high °C (°F)	35.6 (96.1)	37.6 (99.7)	39.2 (102.6)	39.0 (102.2)	37.7 (99.9)	35.5 (95.9)	35.3 (95.5)	35.7 (96.3)	37.2 (99.0)	36.7 (98.1)	34.0 (93.2)	39.0 (102.2)	39.2 (102.6)
Mean daily maximum °C (°F)	30.8 (87.4)	33.1 (91.6)	34.5 (94.1)	33.5 (92.3)	32.2 (90.0)	31.0 (87.8)	30.8 (87.4)	31.1 (88.0)	31.5 (88.7)	31.3 (88.3)	30.9 (87.6)	30.1 (86.2)	31.7 (89.1)
Daily mean °C (°F)	25.7 (78.3)	27.0 (80.6)	28.4 (83.1)	28.6 (83.5)	28.3 (82.9)	27.6 (81.7)	27.3 (81.1)	27.4 (81.3)	27.5 (81.5)	27.0 (80.6)	26.5 (79.7)	25.9 (78.6)	27.3 (81.1)
Mean daily minimum °C (°F)	20.7 (69.3)	20.9 (69.6)	22.4 (72.3)	23.6 (74.5)	24.4 (75.9)	24.2 (75.6)	23.9 (75.0)	23.8 (74.8)	23.5 (74.3)	22.8 (73.0)	22.1 (71.8)	21.7 (71.1)	22.8 (73.0)
Record low °C (°F)	14.6 (58.3)	14.7 (58.5)	16.2 (61.2)	20.4 (68.7)	20.3 (68.5)	20.8 (69.4)	20.2 (68.4)	19.4 (66.9)	19.2 (66.6)	18.3 (64.9)	15.7 (60.3)	14.8 (58.6)	14.6 (58.3)
Average precipitation mm (inches)	62 (2.4)	92 (3.6)	138 (5.4)	262 (10.3)	194 (7.6)	156 (6.1)	114 (4.5)	93 (3.7)	159 (6.3)	359 (14.1)	327 (12.9)	139 (5.5)	2,095 (82.5)
Average relative humidity (%)	65	59	60	69	73	74	73	71	71	74	74	72	69.6
Source: NOAA

== Canals and rivers ==
Considering water supply system of the district it consists of four canals bounded on the North by Kala oya, Central by Meeoya and Deduru oya, South by Ma oya. There are many Large Scale and Small Irrigation Systems that has been implemented based on these canals. These are Rajanganaya, Usgala, Siyambalangamuwa, Hakwatunawa, Kimbulwana Oya, Bathalagoda, Magalla, Palukadawala, Atharagalla, Mediyawa, Wennoruwa and Ambakolawewa are some of the examples.

== Major cities ==
- Kurunegala (Municipal Council)

== Large towns ==
- Kuliyapitiya (Urban Council)

== Other towns ==
- Alawwa
- Bingirya
- Dambadeniya
- Dandagamuwa
- Elibichchiya
- Galgamuwa
- Girathalana
- Giriulla
- Gomugomuwa
- Hettipola
- Hiripitiya
- Ibbagamuwa
- Maho
- Mawathagama
- Melsiripura
- Narammala
- Nikaweratiya
- Panagamuwa
- Panduwasnuwara
- Pannala
- Pannawa
- Polgahawela
- Potuhera
- Ridigama
- Wariyapola
- Yapahuwa

== Villages ==
- Ethungahakotuwa
- Thoranegedara
- Diwrumpola
- Yagamwela
