= Batticaloa =

City in Sri Lanka

Batticaloa மட்டக்களப்பு මඩකලපුව
- City
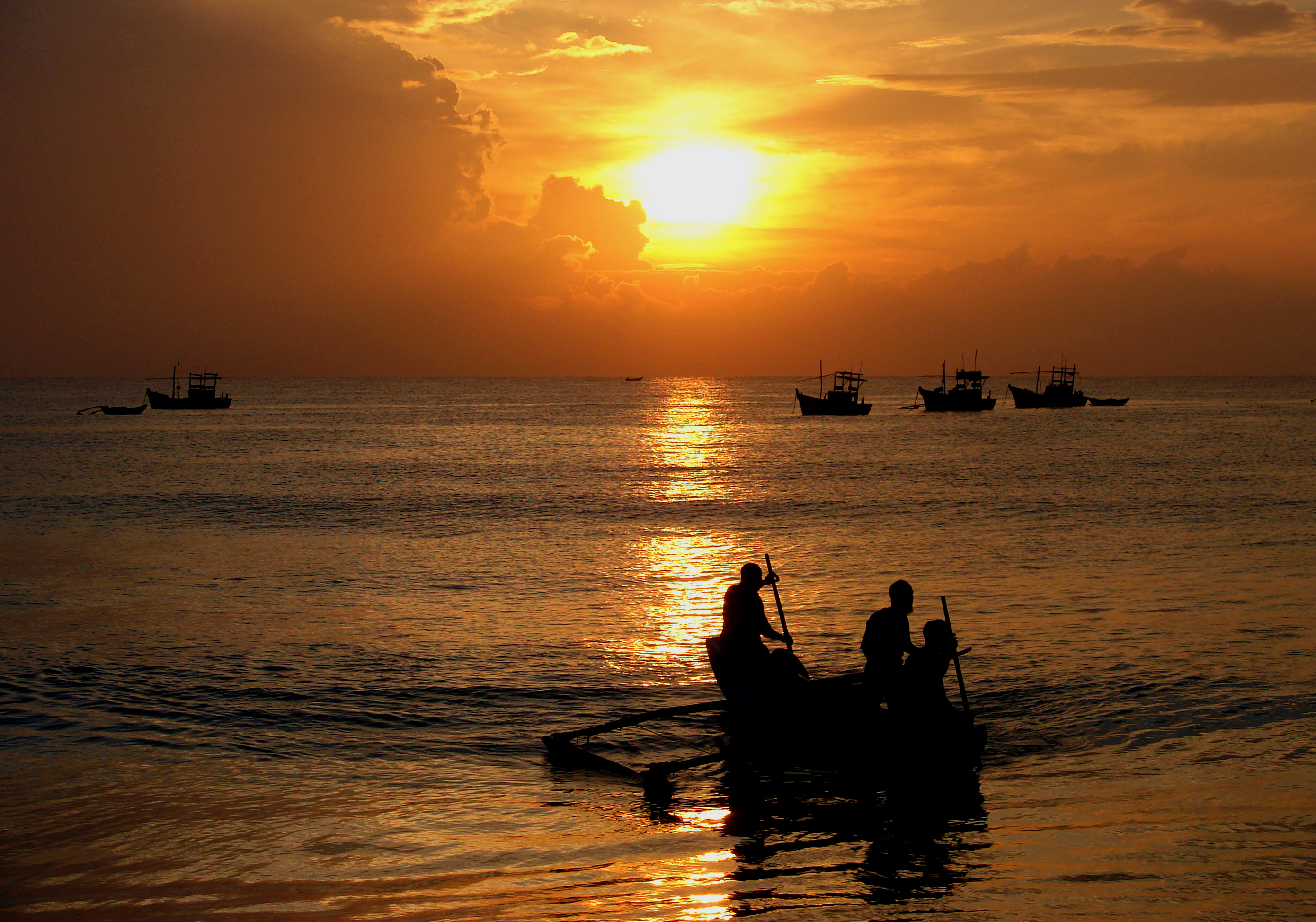
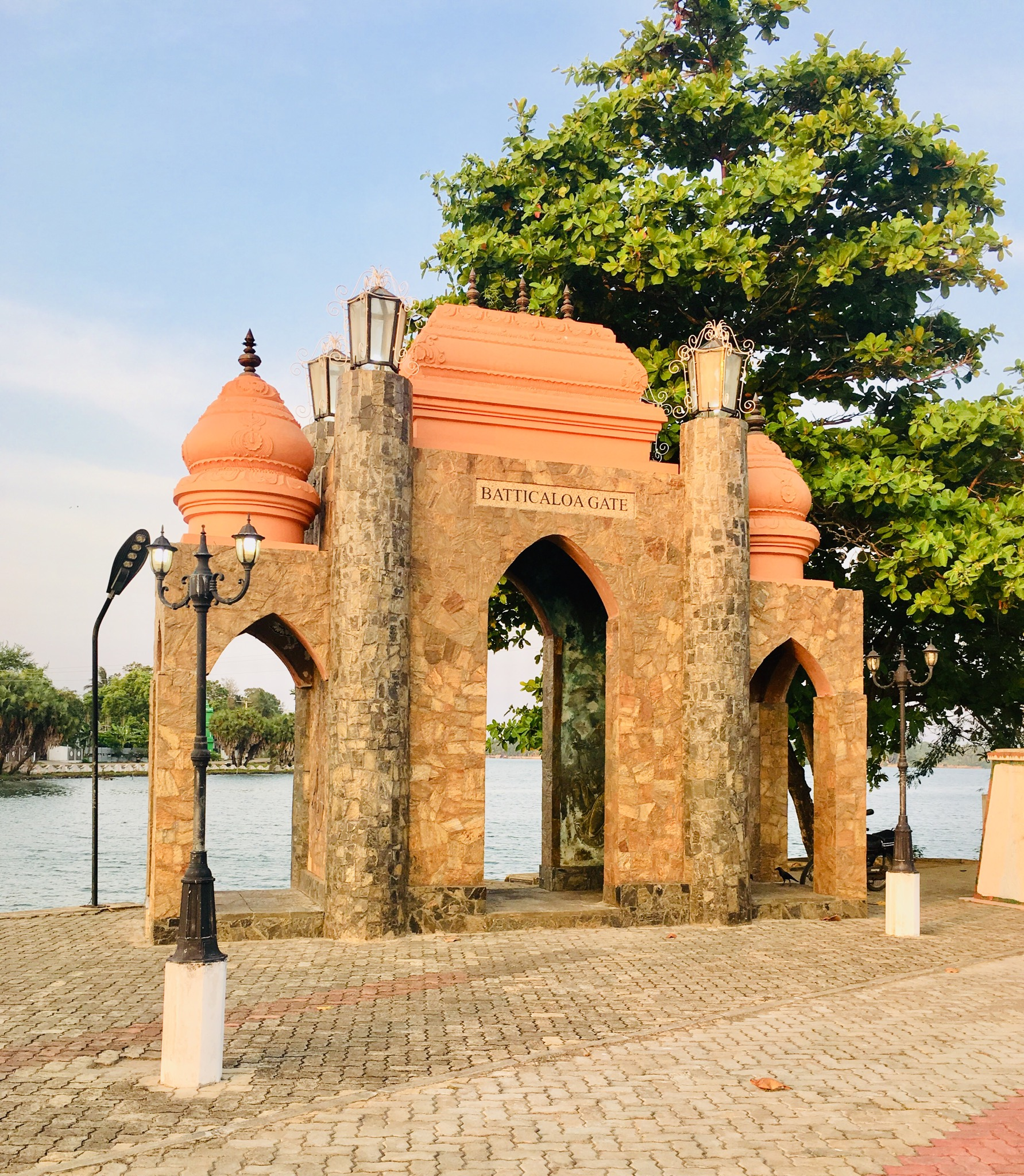
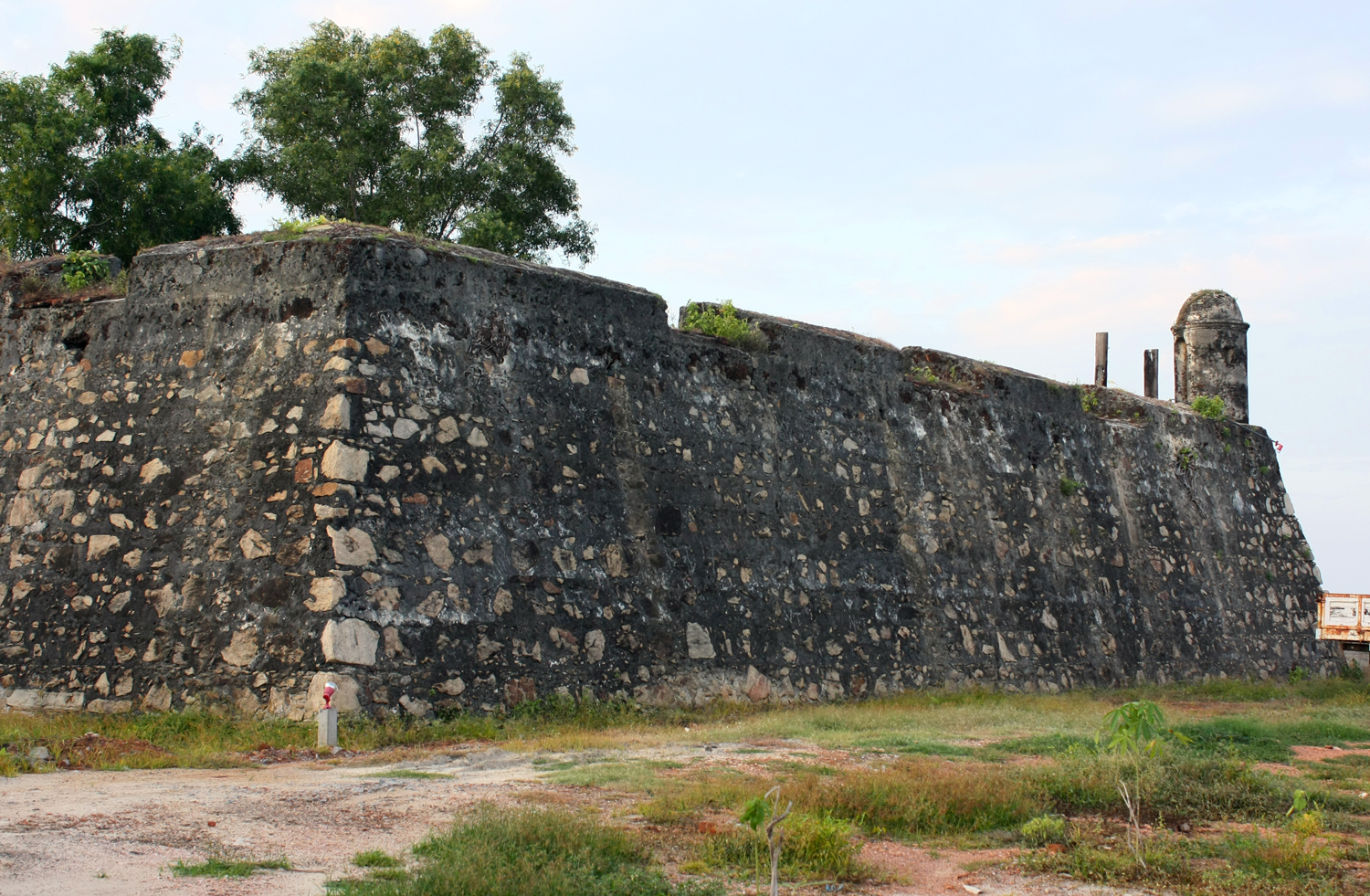
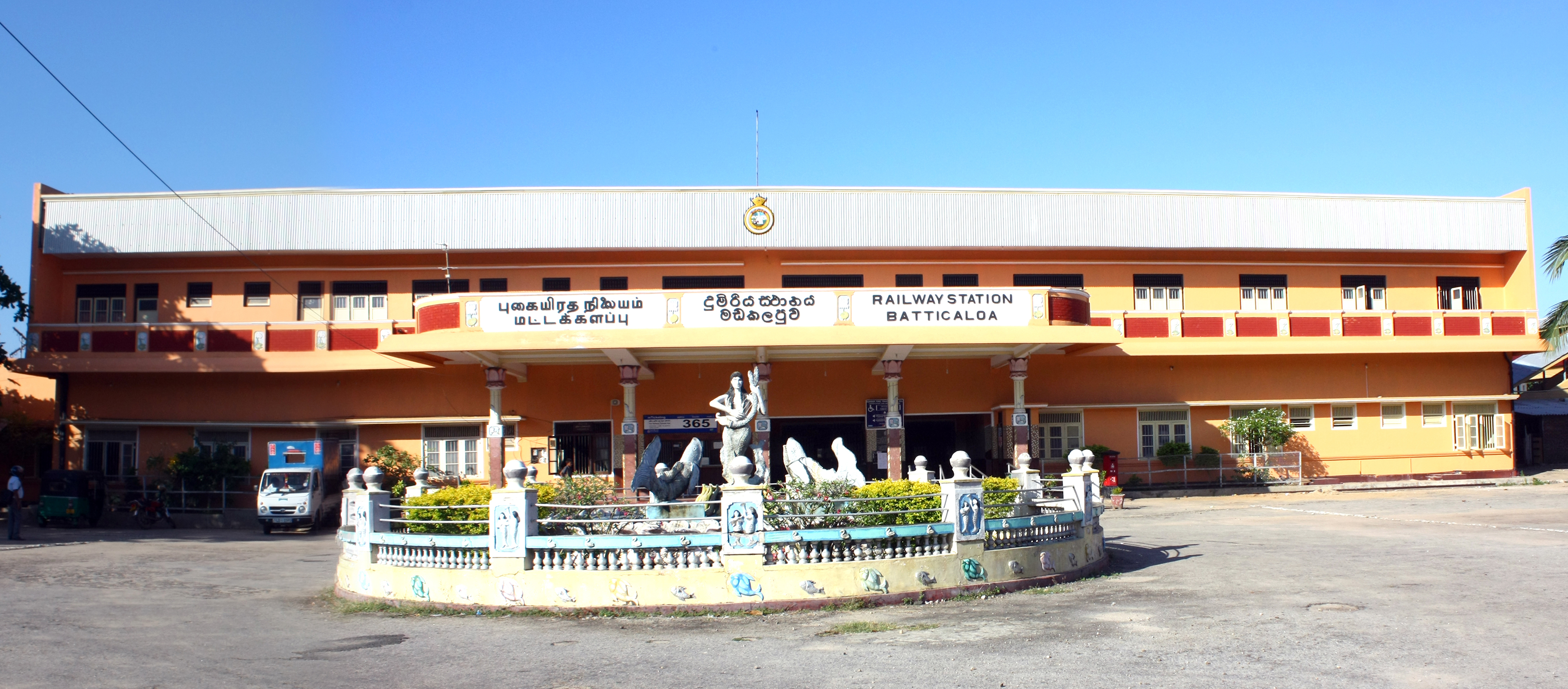
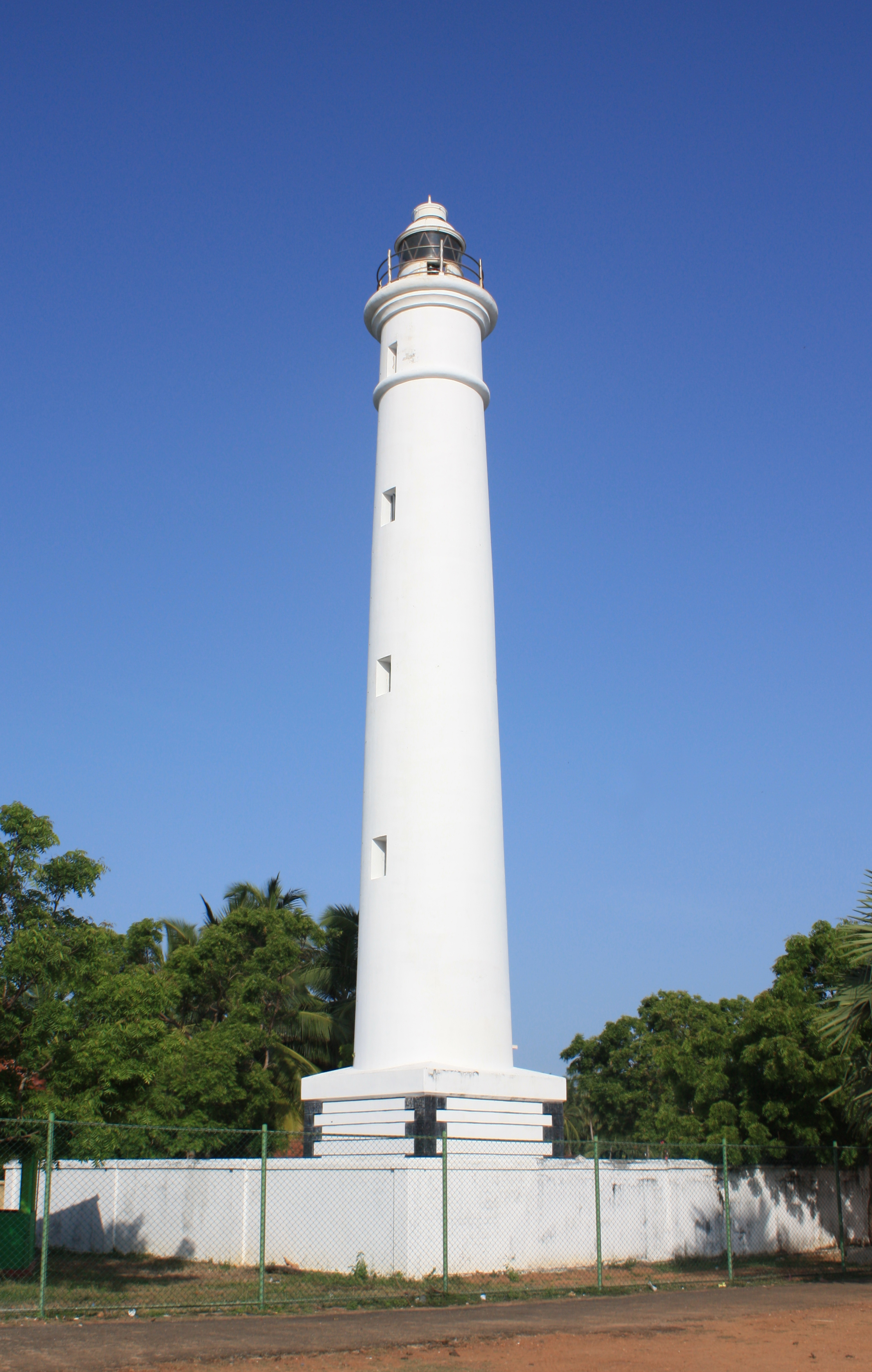
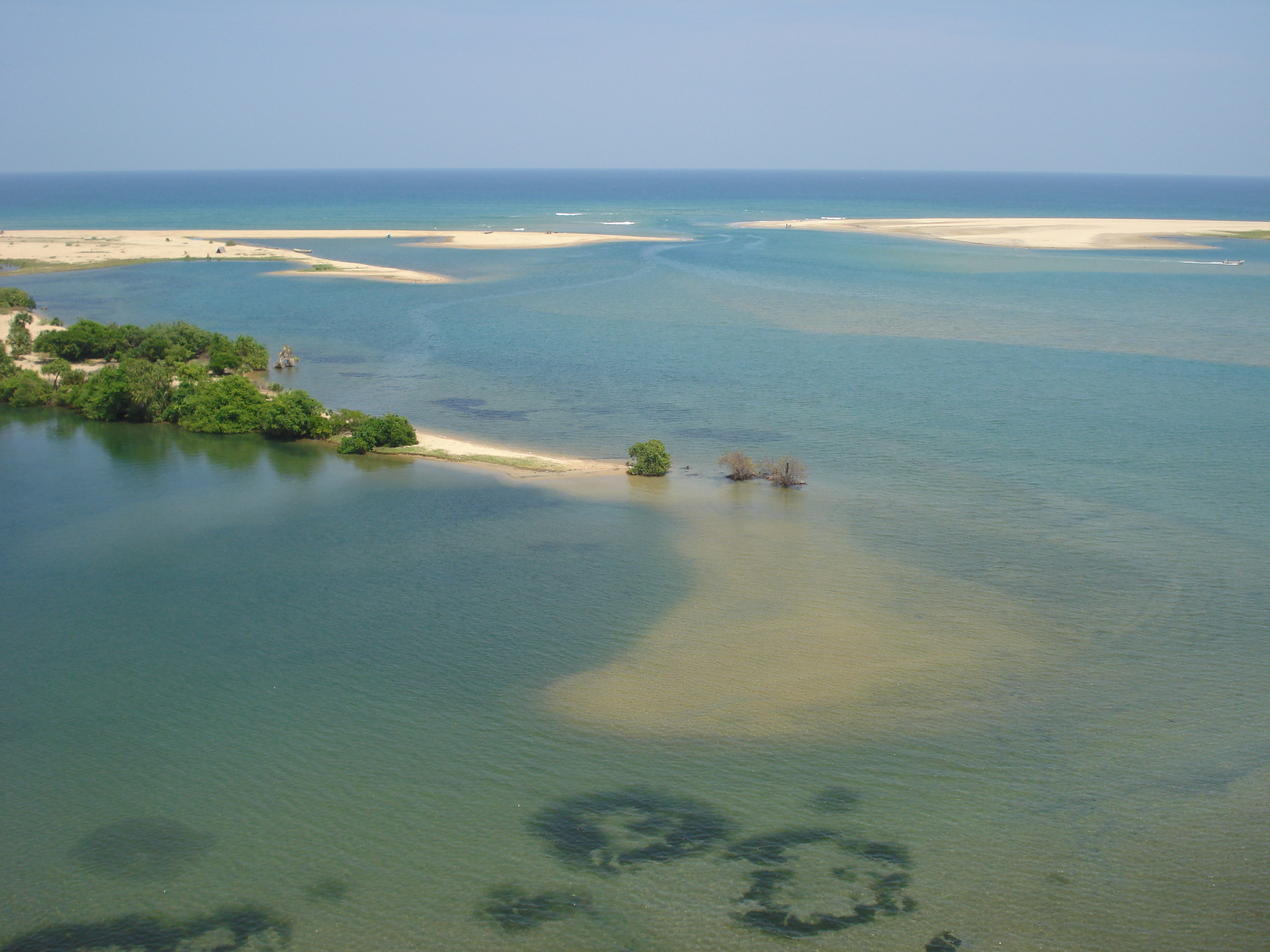
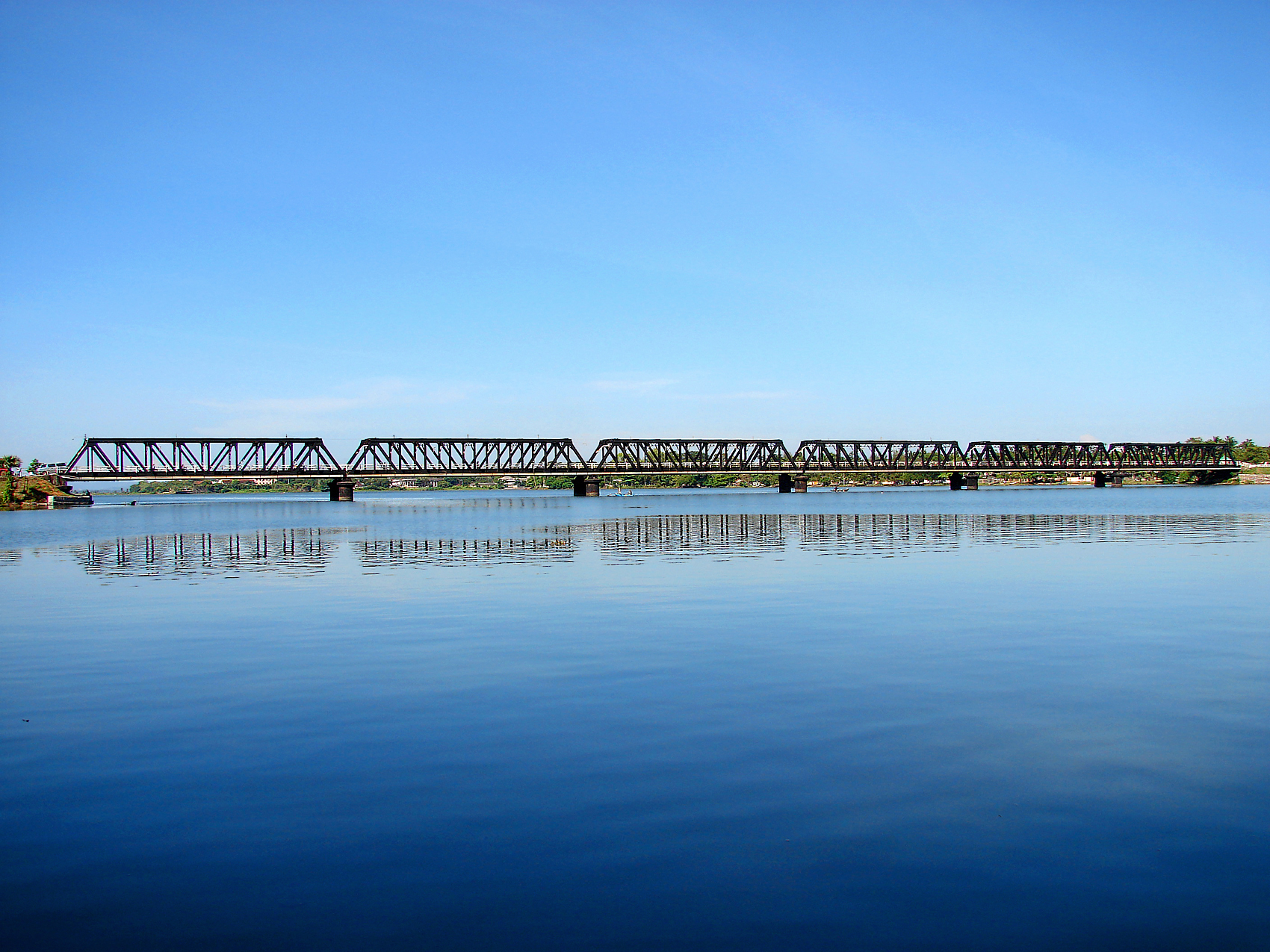
- Fishing at Batticaloa Batticaloa Gate Batticaloa Fort Batticaloa railway station Batticaloa Lighthouse Batticaloa Lagoon Kallady Bridge

- Location within Sri Lanka
- Coordinates: 7°43′0″N 81°42′0″E
- Country: Sri Lanka
- Province: Eastern
- District: Batticaloa
- DS Division: Manmunai North Divisional Secretariat

Government
  - Type: Municipal Council
  - Body: Batticaloa Municipal Council
  - Mayor: Thiyagarajah Saravanapavan (ITAK)
  - Deputy Mayor: K. Sathiyaseelan (TNA)
  - Municipal Commissioner: M. Thayaparan
  - Manmunai North Secretariat: K. Karunaharan

Area
  - City: 75 km^{2} (29 sq mi)
  - Metro: 68 km^{2} (26 sq mi)

Population (2012)
  - City: 86,227
  - Density: 1,268/km^{2} (3,280/sq mi)
  - Urban density: 1,150/km^{2} (3,000/sq mi)
- Demonym: Batticalonian/s (in Tamil: மட்டக்களப்பான்/ர்)
- Time zone: UTC+5:30 (Sri Lanka Standard Time Zone)

Batticaloa (Tamil: மட்டக்களப்பு, Maṭṭakkaḷappu, IPA: [mɐʈːɐkːɐɭɐpːɯ]; Sinhala: මඩකලපුව, Maḍakalapuwa, IPA: [məɖəkələpuʋə]) is a major city in the Eastern Province, Sri Lanka, and its former capital. It is the administrative capital of the Batticaloa District, the seat of the Eastern University of Sri Lanka and is a major commercial centre. It is on Sri Lanka's east coast, 111 kilometres (69 mi) south of Trincomalee, and its old town is located on the island of Puliyanthivu, in the lagoon.

== Etymology ==
Batticaloa is a Portuguese derivation. The original name of the region being the Tamil "Matakkalappu" (translation: Muddy Swamp). According to Mattakallappu Manmiyam (மட்டக்களப்பு மான்மியம்) the word Mattakkallpu consists Tamil words "Mattu" (மட்டு) Matta-derived from "Mattam" (மட்டம்) means 'flat' and geographical name KaLappu. Mukkuwa named this place as KaLappu-Mattam or boundary of lagoon later it became Matta-Kallappu or Flat Lagoon. Also, Batticaloa has a nickname, "Land of the singing fish" (Tamil: மீன் பாடும் தேன் நாடு) due to musical sounds that related to fish or other aquatic creatures in the Batticaloa Lagoon near the Kallady Bridge. BBC Radio 4 was able to record the mysterious sound in Batticaloa Lagoon. The sound was broadcast by Sri Lanka Broadcasting Corporation in 1960s with the help of Rev. Fr. Lang, a Catholic priest.

== Geography ==
Batticaloa is in the eastern coast of Sri Lanka on a flat coastal plain boarded by the Indian Ocean in the east occupies a central part of the eastern Sri Lanka. Its average elevation is around 5 m (16 ft). Batticaloa district has three lagoons such as Batticaloa Lagoon, Valaichchenai Lagoon, and Vakari (Panichchankerni) Lagoon. Among these lagoons, Batticaloa Lagoon is the largest lagoon, which is 56 km (35 mi) long and has an area of 162 km^{2} (63 sq mi), extending from Pankudaweli in North and Kalmunai in South.

There are several islands within the Batticaloa Lagoon such as Puliayantheevu, Buffaloa Island and Bone Island. Many bridges are built across the lagoon connecting the landmasses and the islands. The Puliayantheevu is the metropolitan place of the city. The biggest bridge of all is Lady Manning bridge located at Kallady, which is the main access path to the city from the southern places of the district.

Batticaloa beaches are sandy and located along 4 km (2.5 mi) shoreline in the city and further extend to neighbouring districts. They include Kallady beach, Pasikudah, and Kalkudah. Pasikudah is a popular tourist destination 35 km (22 mi) to the northwest, on a bay protected from the open ocean, with a flat and sandy bed extending 150–200 m (490–660 ft) meters from the shore.

=== Climate ===
Batticaloa has a tropical monsoon climate (Am) under the Köppen climate classification, also generically referred to as 'dry-monsoonal climate'. Batticaloa's climate is warm to hot throughout the year. From March to May, the warmest time of the year, the maximum temperature averages around 32 degrees Celsius (88 degrees Fahrenheit). During the monsoon season from November to February heavy rains are recorded, with average temperature of 25 °C (77 °F). Average annual rainfall in Batticaloa is 1,650.9 mm (65.00 in).

Climate data for Batticaloa (1991–2020)
Month	Jan	Feb	Mar	Apr	May	Jun	Jul	Aug	Sep	Oct	Nov	Dec	Year
Record high °C (°F)	34.2 (93.6)	33.9 (93.0)	36.9 (98.4)	36.5 (97.7)	38.5 (101.3)	39.0 (102.2)	38.7 (101.7)	38.6 (101.5)	38.4 (101.1)	38.0 (100.4)	35.0 (95.0)	32.3 (90.1)	39.0 (102.2)
Mean daily maximum °C (°F)	28.4 (83.1)	29.3 (84.7)	30.8 (87.4)	32.4 (90.3)	33.5 (92.3)	34.5 (94.1)	34.4 (93.9)	33.8 (92.8)	33.0 (91.4)	31.6 (88.9)	29.7 (85.5)	28.6 (83.5)	31.7 (89.1)
Daily mean °C (°F)	26.1 (79.0)	26.6 (79.9)	27.7 (81.9)	29.0 (84.2)	29.8 (85.6)	30.2 (86.4)	30.1 (86.2)	29.6 (85.3)	29.1 (84.4)	28.2 (82.8)	27.0 (80.6)	26.3 (79.3)	28.3 (82.9)
Mean daily minimum °C (°F)	23.7 (74.7)	23.9 (75.0)	24.5 (76.1)	25.6 (78.1)	26.1 (79.0)	25.9 (78.6)	25.7 (78.3)	25.5 (77.9)	25.3 (77.5)	24.8 (76.6)	24.3 (75.7)	23.9 (75.0)	24.9 (76.8)
Record low °C (°F)	17.1 (62.8)	17.4 (63.3)	17.7 (63.9)	20.9 (69.6)	20.9 (69.6)	20.2 (68.4)	21.1 (70.0)	20.6 (69.1)	20.7 (69.3)	20.2 (68.4)	18.0 (64.4)	17.7 (63.9)	17.1 (62.8)
Average precipitation mm (inches)	268.9 (10.59)	148.5 (5.85)	70.3 (2.77)	52.6 (2.07)	51.7 (2.04)	31.5 (1.24)	30.7 (1.21)	52.1 (2.05)	69.3 (2.73)	186.8 (7.35)	418.6 (16.48)	468.8 (18.46)	1,849.6 (72.82)
Average precipitation days (≥ 1.0 mm)	11.1	6.6	4.7	4.1	3.8	3.1	2.7	3.4	4.4	10.5	17.2	16.8	88.5
Average relative humidity (%)	79	78	78	78	75	68	69	69	74	82	83	83	76
Mean monthly sunshine hours	201.5	228.8	266.6	270.0	251.1	264.0	251.1	263.5	246.0	232.5	198.0	170.5	2,843.6
Mean daily sunshine hours	6.5	8.1	8.6	9.0	8.1	8.8	8.1	8.5	8.2	7.5	6.6	5.5	7.8
Source 1: NOAA
Source 2: Deutscher Wetterdienst (humidity and sun), Department of Meteorology (records up to 2007)

== History ==
=== Early history ===
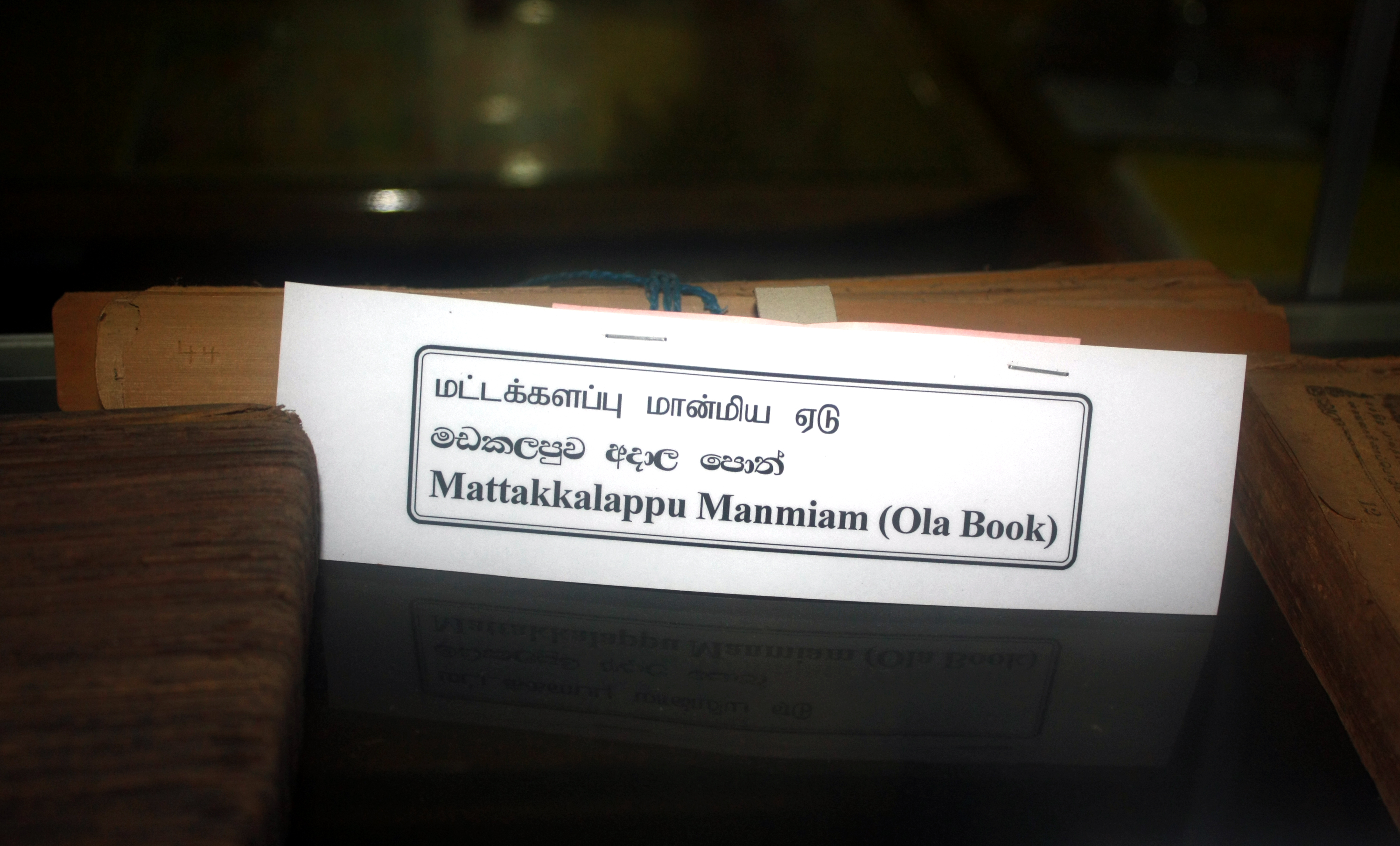
Mattakallappu Manmiyam Palm-leaf manuscripts at the Batticaloa Museum.

Mattakallappu Manmiyam refers (மட்டக்களப்பு மான்மியம்) Mukkuva or Mutkuhar are known as the first people migrated to this land and constructed seven villages in various areas. They immigrated their people from India and established the kingdom of Mukkuva. The name of the villages and towns in Batticaloa still holds the historical evidence of the ancient batticaloan people. When Mutkuhar intruded through the salty water and reached the destination of their voyage at the forests situated around the lagoon. When they finished. The name given by the Mukkuva was "Kallpu-Mattam" which literally means "boundary of lagoon". Later it was called "Matta-Kallappu" which indicates the destination of Mukkuva's voyage and the water is flat.

=== Mukkuva wars ===
Mukkuva is a coastal community from Ancient Tamil country. They are of mixed origin and migrated at various periods in history. Mukkuvas waged war around Puttalam and settled in the western coast as well. Sinhala Kings of Suryawamsa kept Mukkuvas as their mercenary force. They waged wars on other countries like Burma. Gajabahu, Parakramabahu, Vijayabahu were some of these Suryawamsa kings who employed the Chera soldiers for their protection and defence of Sri Lanka. Gajabahu I was a friend of Cheran Chenkuttuvan and was mentioned in the great Jain epic of Silappadikaram and in addition to that he was also mentioned in Mahawamsa.

When Anuradhapura was destroyed, the capital moved from Anuradhapura to Polonnaruwa. When Pollonaruwa was destroyed the capital moved to Kotte and then to Kandy. Anuradhapura was destroyed by Rajaraja Cholan and he who established Polonnaruwa. Even though Pollonaruwa had a few Hindu temples it was a great Buddhist city full of beautiful Buddhist architecture matching Angkor Wat.

=== Kalinga Magha ===
As a catalyst for change, Kalinga Magha is arguably one of the most significant rulers in Sri Lankan history. His invasion marks the final – cataclysmic – destruction of the kingdom of Rajarata, which had for so long been the heart of native power on the island. The great cities of the ancient kings were now lost and disappeared into the jungle, and were not rediscovered until the 19th century. Native power was henceforth centred on a kaleidoscopically shifting collection of kingdoms in south and central Sri Lanka. The north, in the meanwhile, eventually evolved into the Jaffna Kingdom, which was subjected colonial rule by the Portuguese in 1619.

Kalinga Magha's geopolitical impact is reflected in the changing language of the Culavamsa as well. The traditional divisions of Sri Lanka, into Rajarata, Dhakkinadesa, and Ruhuna, first undergo a change of names (Rajarata becomes Pathithadesa, Dhakkinadesa becomes Mayarata), and then slip into obsolescence altogether. Their successor kingdoms tended to be geographically smaller and centred on a strong citadel-capital, such as Yapahuwa or Gampola; they also tended to be much short lived, like Sitawaka.

=== Jaffna principality ===
With the decline of the Rohana sub-kingdom and the defeat of Polonnaruwa, coming with the rise of Chola power, i.e., from about the 13th century CE, these regions became wild. The many irrigation works (tanks etc., which exist even today) became home to malaria (see History of Sri Lanka). In the meantime, the eastern coastal region remained less affected by Malaria and began to be occupied. Thus seafaring people who had begun to settle down along the coast since the Anuradhapura times, c. 6th Century CE began to flourish. The forests continued to be dominated by the Veddha population which claimed kingship ("cross-cousins") with the Sinhala kings of Kandy.

Parakramabahu II's coronation took place in 1236. He turned his attention to the recovery of Polonnaruwa from the Tamils, and achieved this purpose by 1244. In this connection two kings are mentioned, Kalinga Magha and Jaya Bahu, who had been in power forty years, apparently reckoned from the time of the military rule after Sahasa Malla. As the Tamil war' and the `Malala war' as specifically mentioned by contemporary chronicles the two kings may have held different parts of the country. In the king's eleventh year (1244/5) Lanka was invaded by Chandrabhanu, a Javanese (Javaka) from Tambralinga, with a host armed with blow-pipes and poisoned arrows: he may have been a sea-robber, and though now repulsed descended on the Island later on.

The rest of the reign according to the contemporary records was spent in pious works; the king also held a convocation for the purpose of reforming the priesthood, whose discipline had been relaxed during the Tamil occupation. The chronicles make no mention of a great Pandyan invasion which seems to have taken place between 1254 and 1256, in which one of the kings of Lanka was slain and the other rendered tributary. From this it is clear that Parakramabahu II never had recovered the north of the Island, which certainly had been held by his great namesake.

=== European colony ===
Portugal

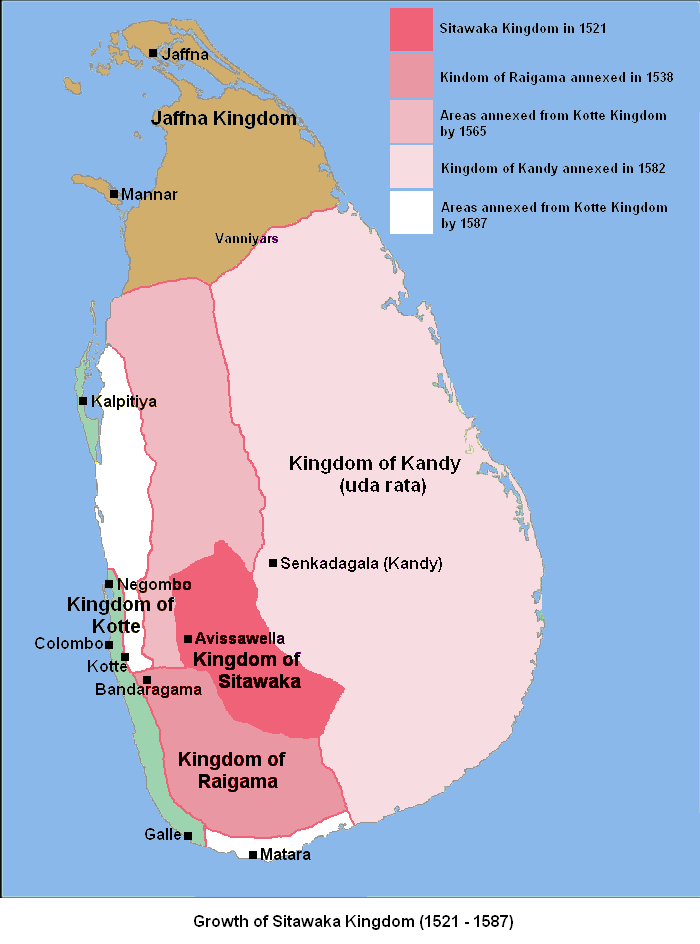
The growth and impact of the kingdom of Sitawaka, 1521–1594

Lourenço de Almeida, the Portuguese Admiral for India invaded Ceylon and made it a Portuguese colony. Batticaloa was fortified in the 1620s, which was held until 1638, when the Dutch successfully invaded it.

=== Batticaloa principality ===
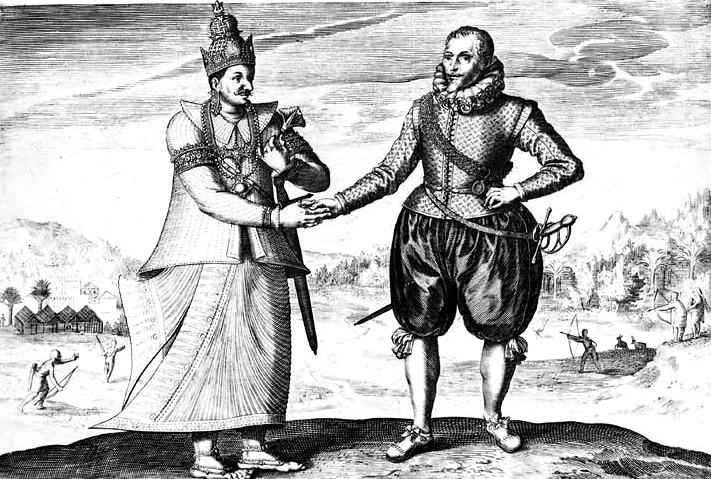
Vimaladharmasurya I receiving Joris van Spilbergen, 1603

Lanka was a confederacy of various rulers for a long time and different princes ruled the different provinces and helped each other and plotted against each other. As the Portuguese colonisers were dividing and ruling Kotte, Kandy Kingdom and Jaffna Kingdom had to create a confederacy to fight against Portugal. As a joint strategy they approached the Netherlands to have a global free trade and to get rid of the Portuguese.

From Cape Comorin the Dutch Admiral Joris van Spilbergen steered his course to Point de Galle; but, without landing there or at any of the other places which were strongly fortified by the Portuguese, he sailed round the south coast of the Island and made for Batticaloa, where he anchored on 31 May 1602.

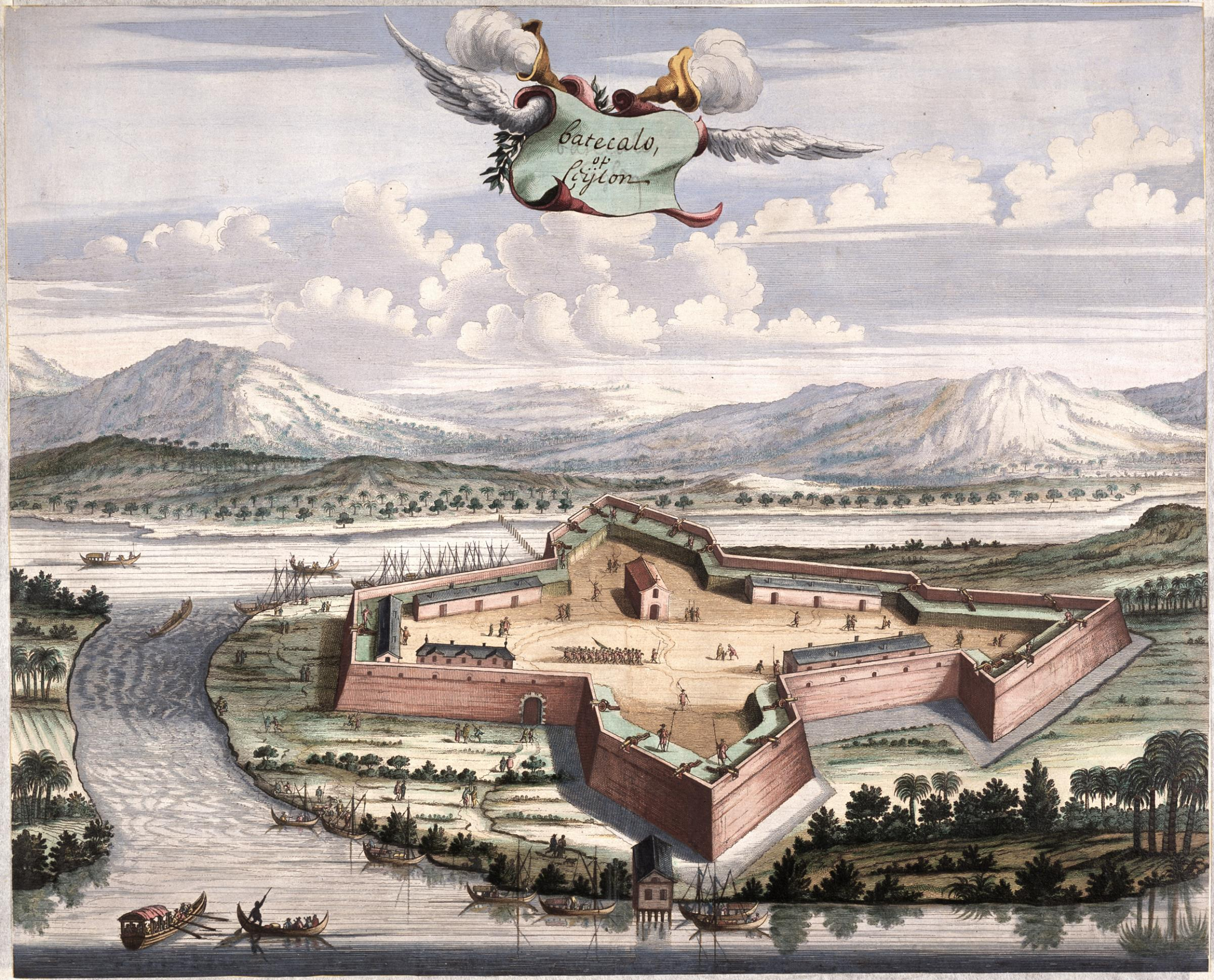
Batticaloa fort, c. 1665

He learnt that the town of Batticaloa, where the chief of the province resided, was about three miles (5 km) inland; so he sent him a messenger proposing to enter into trade with him. In the meantime he learnt from some Tamils who came on board that there was plenty of pepper and cinnamon to be had, but that it was to be obtained from the chief of the place. These Tamils brought with them a Portuguese interpreter; for Portuguese was the only European language then heard or spoken in Ceylon, and the natives of the island had no idea that there were other white people who spoke a different language.

The Admiral was taken from Batticaloa to Kandy and was given a liberation hero's welcome as King Rajasinghe seized the opportunity to get rid of the Portuguese, the oppressors who were slowly encroaching the island systematically and promoting subversion against Rajasinghe.

The Batticaloa fort was built by the Portuguese in 1628 and was the first to be captured by the Dutch (18 May 1638). It is one of the most picturesque of the small Dutch fort of Sri Lanka, it's situated on the island of Puliyanthivu, and remains in good condition.

=== World War II ===
In 1942, during World War II, the aircraft carrier HMS Hermes and escorting destroyer HMAS Vampire were stationed at Trincomalee. Both these ships came under Japanese aerial attack off Batticaloa and were sunk. Some of the remnants of HMS Hermes still remain at around 9 nautical miles (17 km) off Batticaloa.

=== 2004 tsunami ===
The town was also one of the worst hit during the tsunami of December 26, 2004. The water rose up to 4.7 metres (15 ft) within 90 minutes of the beginning of the 2004 Indian Ocean earthquake.

=== 2019 Easter Bombings ===
On 21 April 2019 the Zion Church was targeted by militant Islamic suicide bombers. At least 28 people were reported dead.

== Modern Batticaloa Town ==
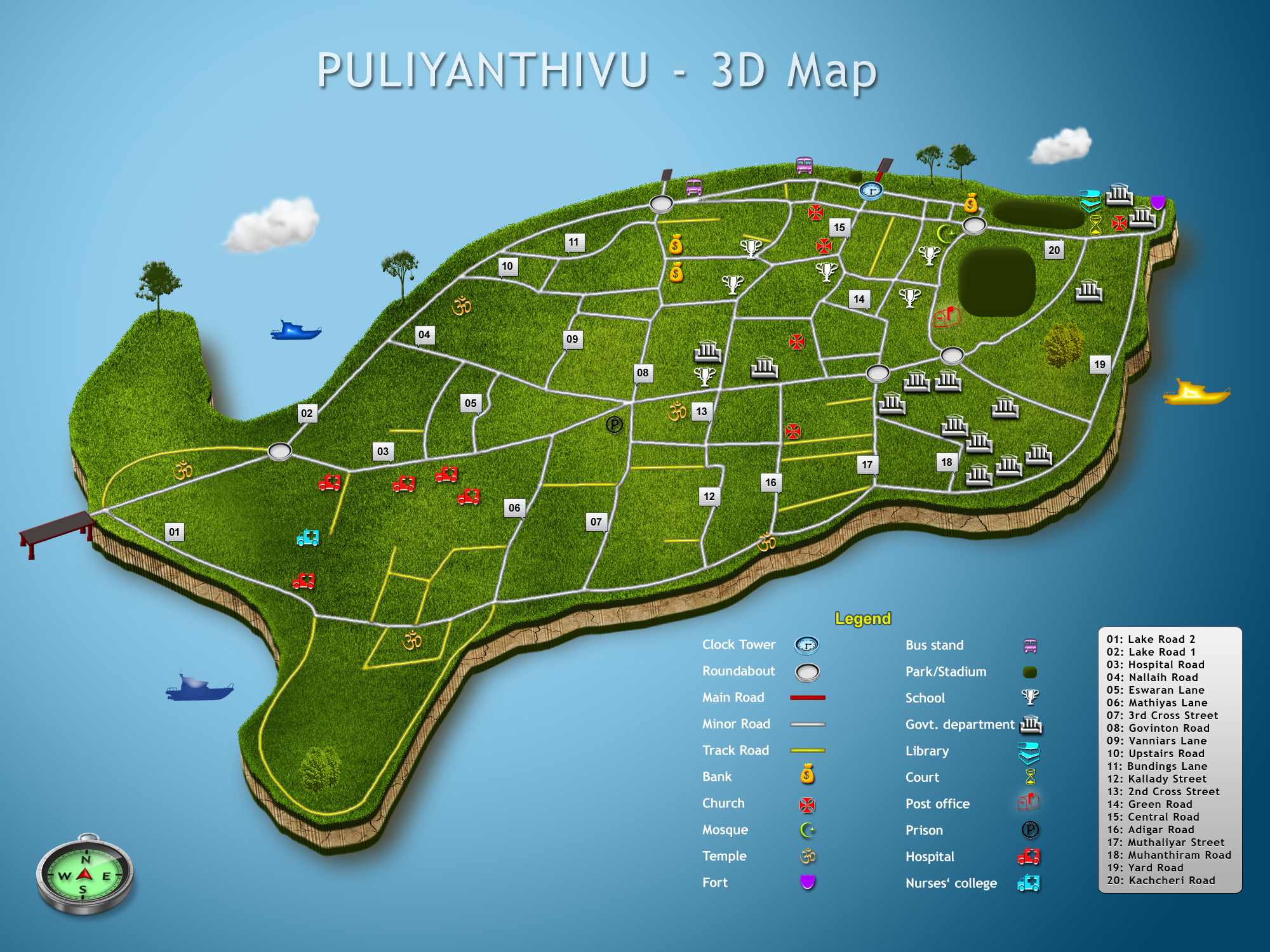
Puliyanthivu 3D map

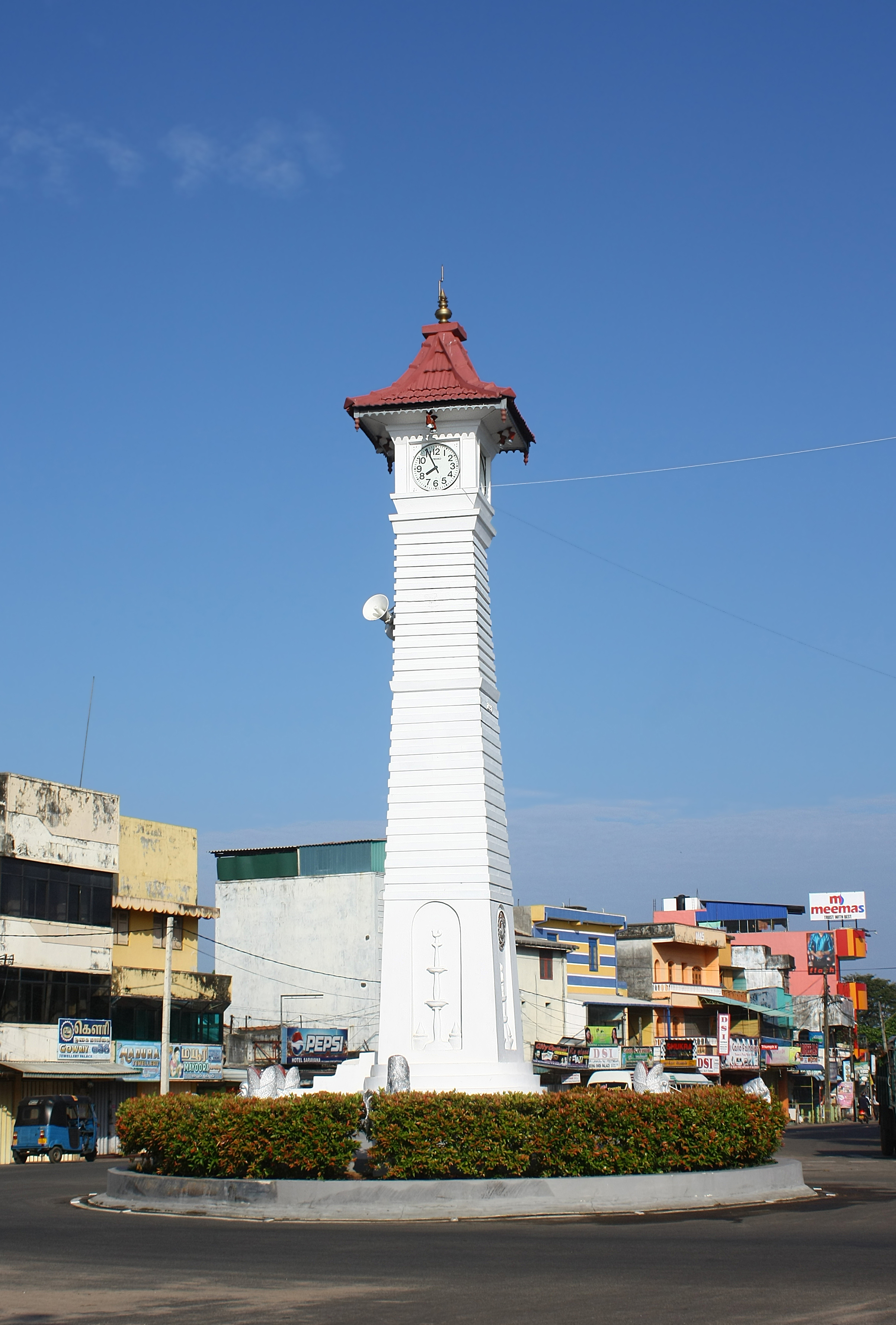
Batticaloa Clock Tower

The city has four main divisions.

- Puliyanthivu: The old town, home to government offices, schools, banks, religious places, the general hospital, Weber Stadium and shops.
- Koddamunai: Schools, Banks, Sri Lanka Telecom regional office for East, Shops and many government offices are located. Two bridges called Perya Palam and Puthuppalam are connects Pulianthivu island with Koddaminai.
- Kallady: Here there are many government buildings and private industries, schools, hospitals and Eastern University Medical Faculty. Kallady Lady Manning bridge connects Kallady and Arasay.
- Puthur: This is where the domestic airport of Batticaloa is located.

== Demography ==
Batticaloa is on the East coast of Sri Lanka, 314 km from Colombo. The population of 95,489 consists mainly of Sri Lankan Tamils; others include Moors, Sinhalese, Burghers, and the indigenous Vedda population.

The District of Batticaloa itself consists of several administrative divisions, which are: Manmunai North, Manmunai West, Manmunai South & Eruvil Pattu, Manmunai Pattu, Koralai Pattu North, Porativu Pattu, Kattankudy, Eravur Pattu, Eravur Town, Koralai Pattu and Koralai Pattu West. Some 525,142 persons (52.2% female) were recorded in the 2012 census. Religion-based statistics in the year 2012 are: Hindus 64.6%, Muslims 25.5%, Christians 8.8%, with a small numbers of Buddhists (1.1%) and others. These figures became even more polarized towards Hindus during the LTTE occupation which came to an end in 2009 (see Eelam War IV).

According to the 2012 census, the total population was 525,142. Of which 381,285 were Sri Lankan Tamils, 133,844 Moors, 6,127 were Sinhalese, 2,794 Burgher, 1,015 Indian Tamils, 58 Veddah, 16 Malay, and 3 Sri Lanka Chetty.

== Educational institutions ==
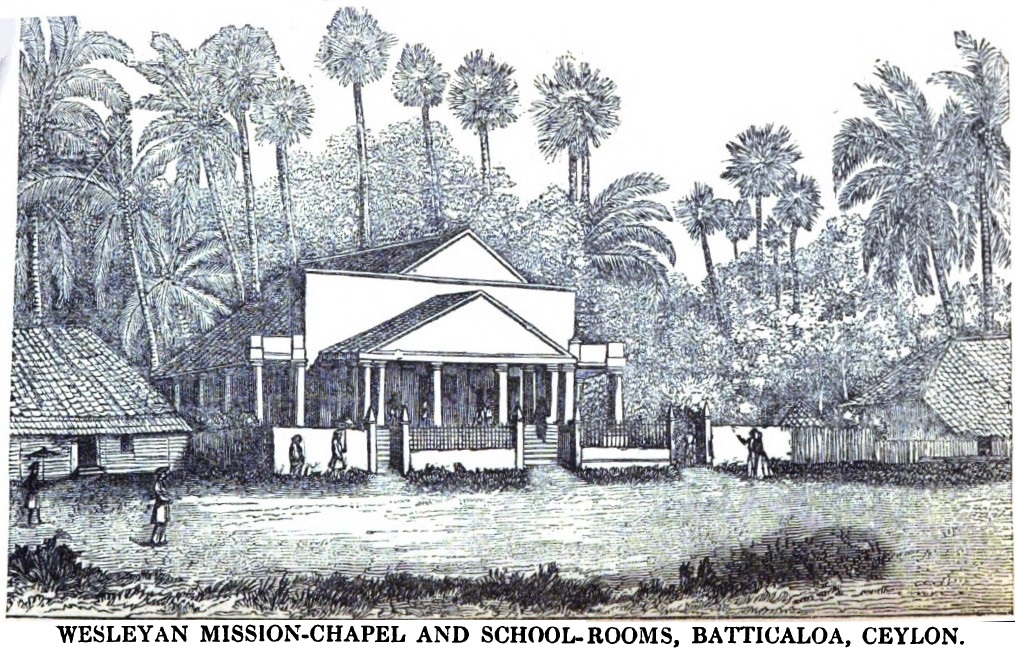
Wesleyan Mission-Chapel and School, Batticaloa (1850)

The first educational institution established in Batticaloa was Methodist Central College, founded in 1814 by the Wesleyan Methodist William Ault. Other noteworthy institutions are Sivananda Vidyalayam, Hindu College, St. Michael's College National School, St. Cecilia's Girls' College and Vincent Girls' High School. The Eastern University, located in Vantharumoolai, 16 km north of Batticaloa, was founded in 1980. Its development was interrupted by the civil war. It is the cultural and economic focal point of the district of Batticaloa and extends its influence towards Trincomalee as well. Batticaloa Regional centre of Open University of Sri Lanka is another education resource of Batticaloa.

== Cultural institutions ==
Batticaloa has historically been a centre of Portuguese Burgher culture, supported in the modern era by the Catholic Burgher Union. In the 1980s, despite Burger emigration to Australia, the Union still numbered some 2,000 speakers of Sri Lankan Portuguese, making them the largest community still speaking the dialect.

== Religious institutions ==
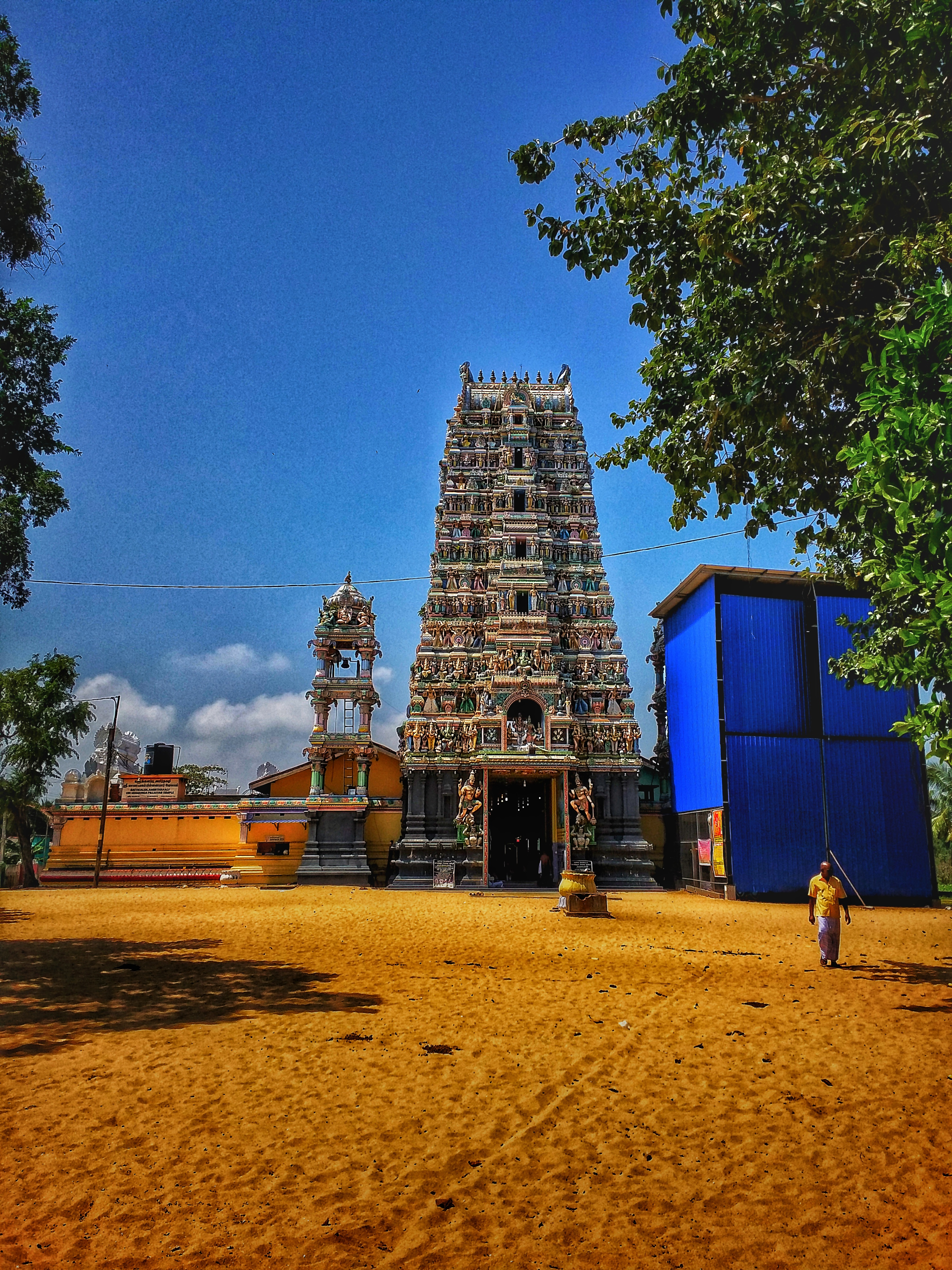
Shri Mamangeshwarar Kovil, Batticaloa

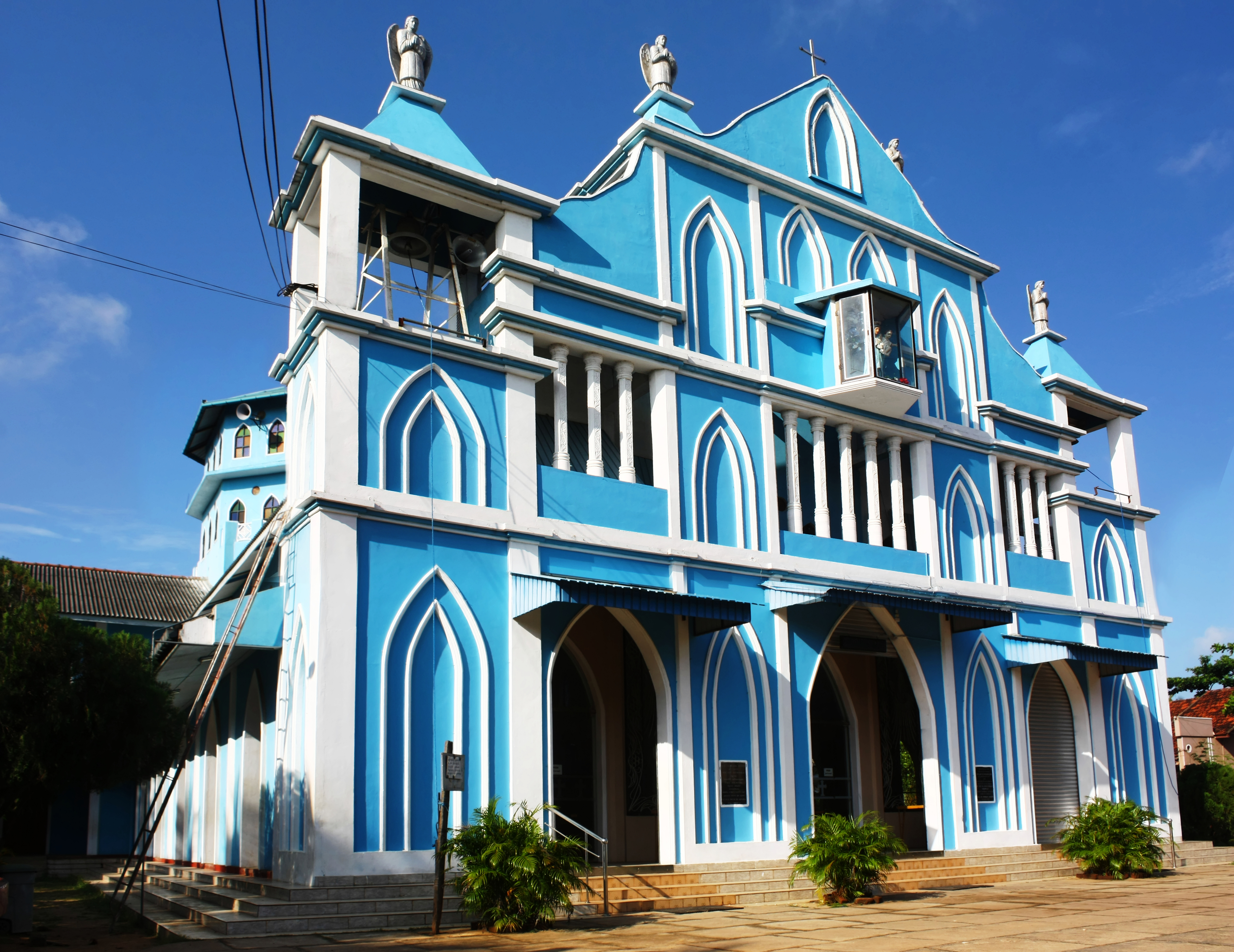
Church of Our Lady of Presentation, Batticaloa

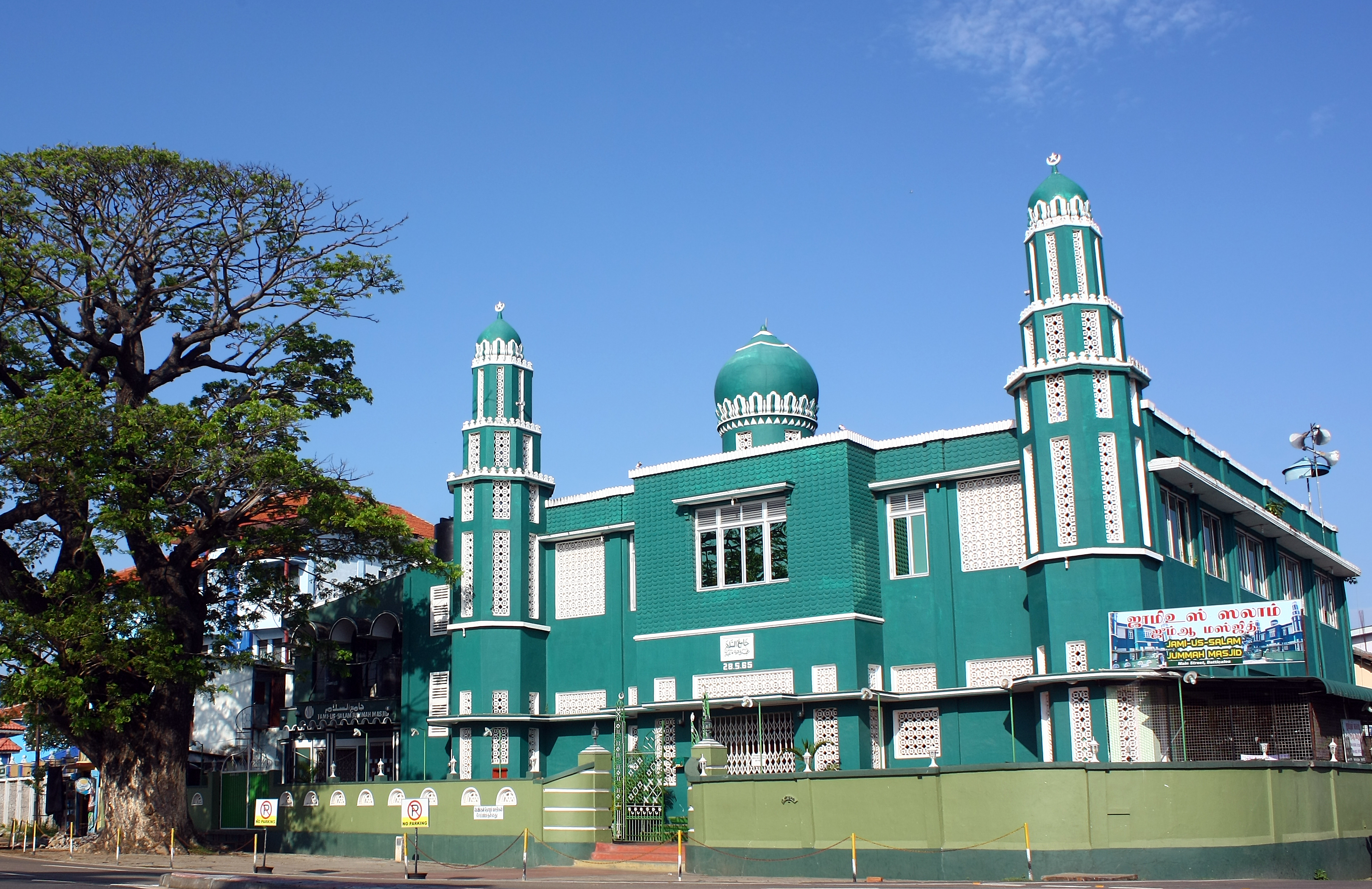
Jami-Us-Salam Jummah Masjid

Hinduism is the major religion of Batticaloa. Eastern Province is a place of Amman temples. This shows the worship of female deity Kannaki of Silappatikaram. The cult has come with the King Gajabahu I who brought the settler Tamils from the Chera Kingdom of his friend Cheran Senguttuvan. Silppatikaram copy was initially discovered in Trincomalee by Tamil scholars. Tamil Nadu was not having a copy of this great Tamil literature. The northern and eastern parts of Sri Lanka have several temples in honour of Kannaki Amman. Gajabahu I brought Amman worship to Sri Lanka in the Third Century AD after her death.

Shri Mamangeshwarar Kovil is one of the main holy places for Hindus in the country is located in a place called Amirthakally which is 6 Kilometers away from Batticaloa town. Hindus believe that by bathing in the sacred waters of the Mamangeshwarar tank, the departed souls of their family will be receiving better attainments in their cycle of its transmigration. Sri Kandaswamy/KannakaiAmman Kovil are important from a devotional point of view. The Mandur (மண்டூர்) temple is in the southern end, while the Mamangeshwarar temple is in the westernmost edge at Muhaththuvaram (முகத்துவாரம்).

The Colany Mosque, and the Koddamunai Dharga and Madrasa are two noteworthy Muslim institutions. There are a large number of mosques in the region.

Christianity is present and Catholic churches are found everywhere as the coastal community has some Catholics. During the colonial influences, Catholic was introduced to Batticaloan, and the first Catholic church in Batticaloa was established in 1624. The Catholic Church has a diocese headquartered in the city. Methodists, Anglicans, and other Protestants and their schools are also present in Batticaloa. Within Batticaloa Municipal Council area, Christian presence is strong (23%) compare to other area.

The latter is a historic harbour and ancient Buddhist shrine, mentioned in the "Dhathu Vamsa". While the Dagaba and shrine in the Dutch Fort is the oldest (1st century CE), Mangalaramaya is a well-known modern Buddhist temple in Batticaloa.

== Economic activities ==
Rice and coconuts are the two staples of the district, and steamers trading round the island call regularly at the port. The lagoon is famous for its "singing fish," supposed to be shell-fish which give forth musical notes. The district has a small population of Veddahs, which are the indigenous Sri Lankans. Prior to the Sri Lankan civil war, there were large-scale shrimp farms as well as fish and rice processing. Batticaloa shows a huge potential for tourism related industries.

=== Transport ===
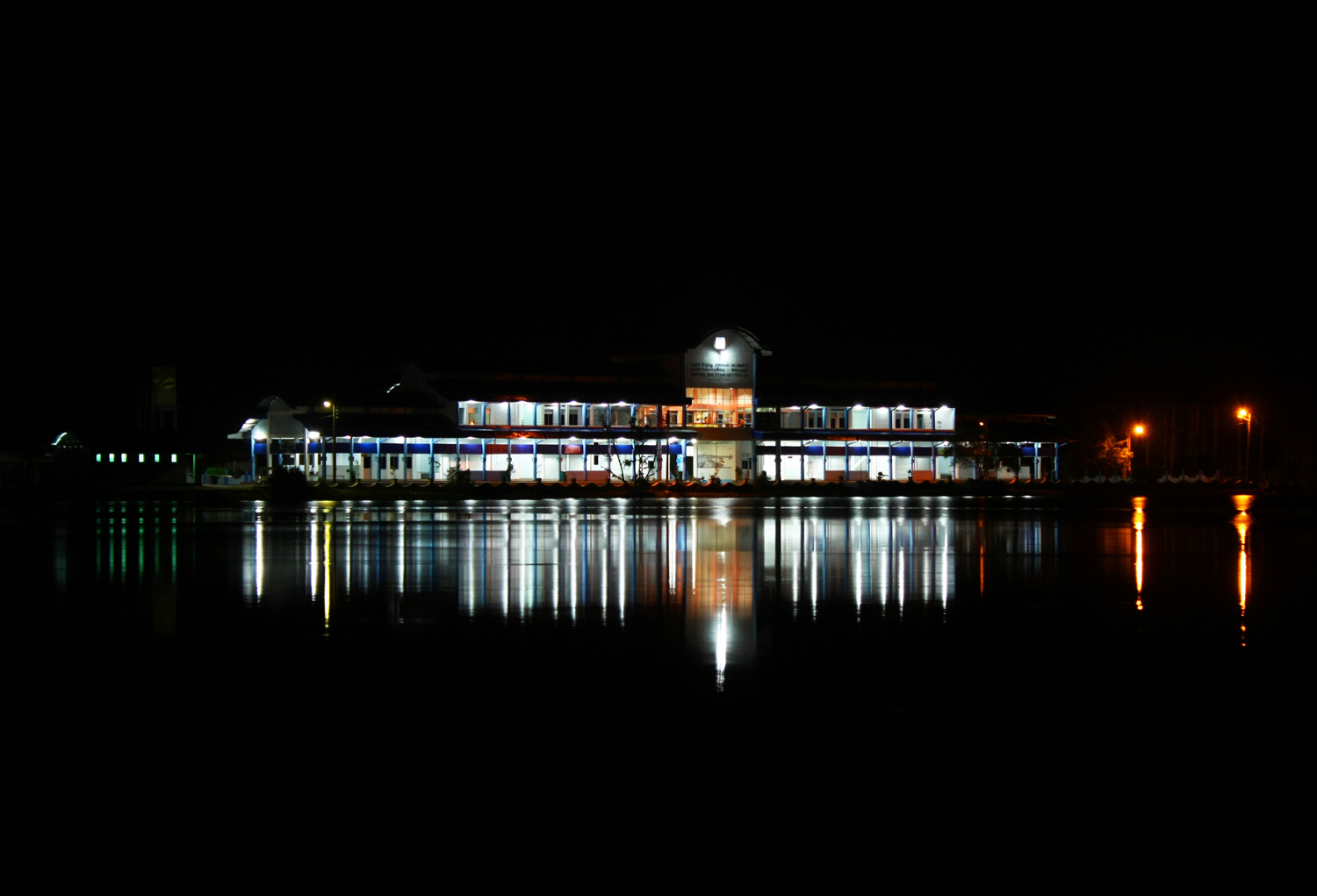
Batticaloa bus stand, night view from north

Batticaloa is the terminus of a Broad gauge branch railway (the Batticaloa Line) of the Sri Lanka Railways network. Batticaloa Airport is a military air force base, which has domestic air service to civilian as well by Cinnamon Air and Helitours. Bus service is available to major cities of Sri Lanka.

== See also ==
- Batticaloa Tamil dialect
- List of cities in Sri Lanka
- Portuguese Burghers
- Vellaveli Brahmi Inscription
