= Kallady Bridge =

Kallady Bridge கல்லடிப் பாலம் කල්ලඩි පාලම
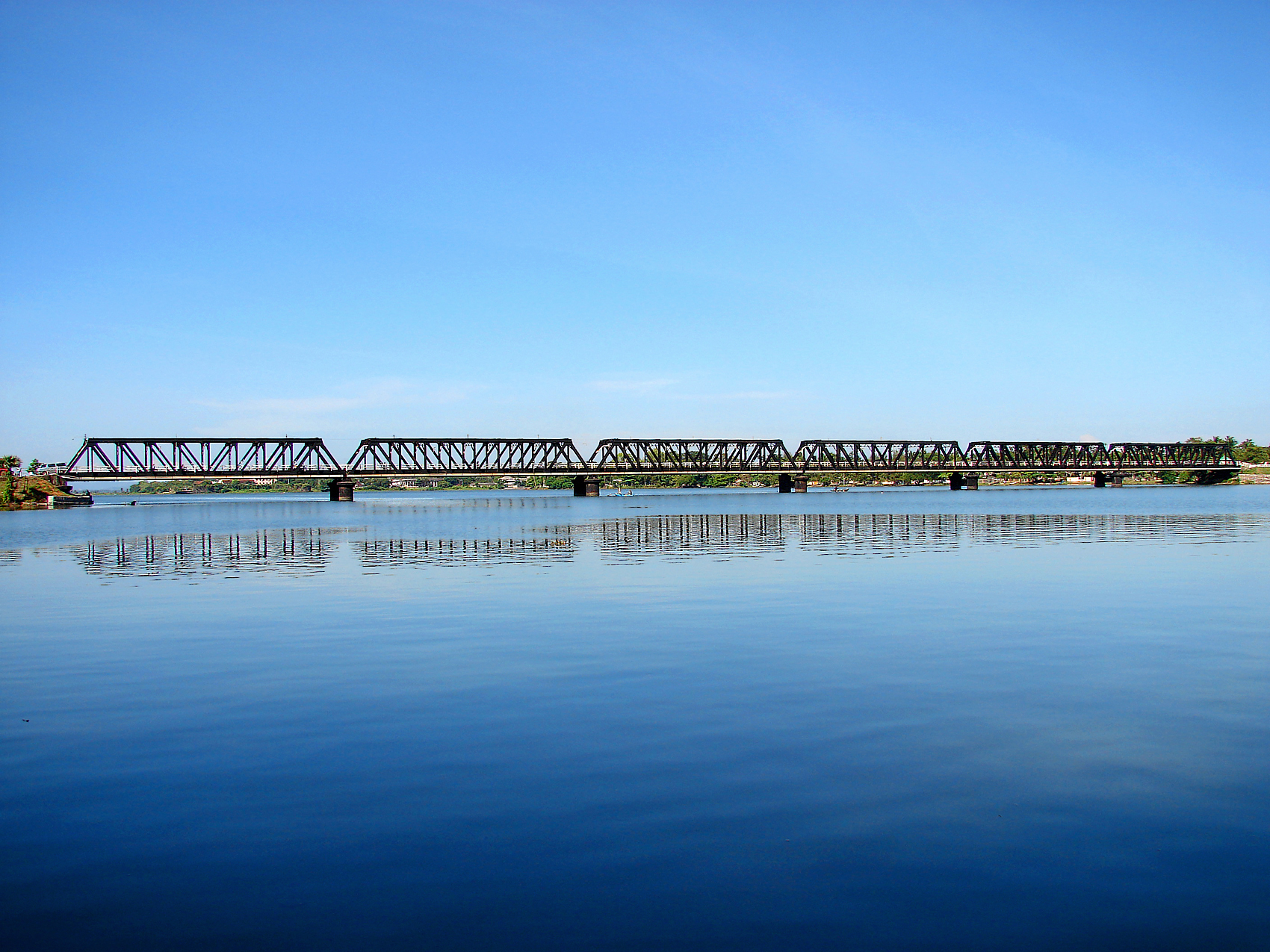
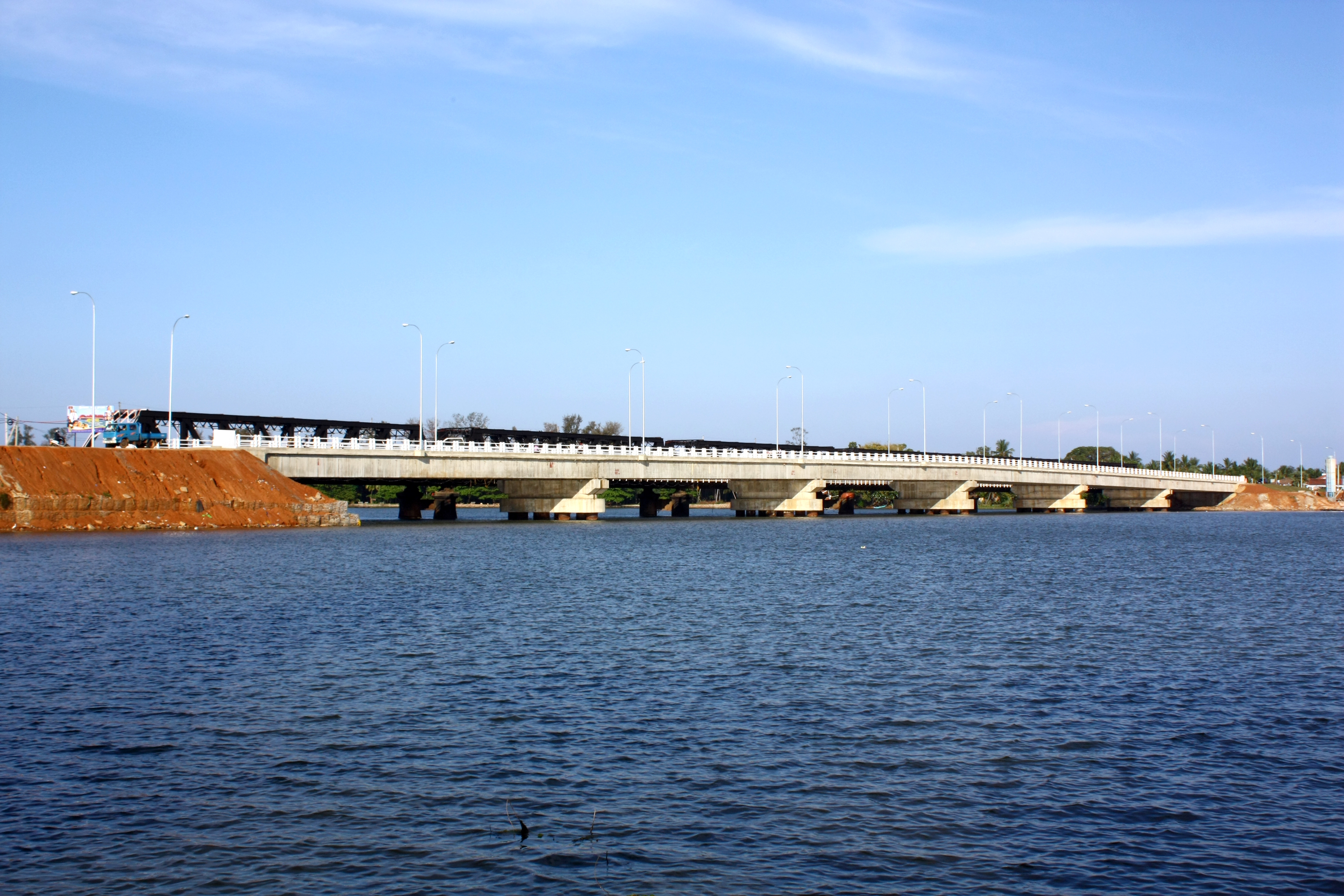
- Old Kallady Bridge (above); New Kallady Bridge (below)
- Coordinates: 7°43′09.50″N 81°42′26.40″E
- Carries: Motor vehicles on the A4 highway
- Crosses: Batticaloa Lagoon
- Locale: Batticaloa, Batticaloa District
- Other name: Lady Manning Bridge
- Owner: Ministry of Ports & Highways
- Maintained by: Road Development Authority

Characteristics
- Design: Truss bridge (old)
- Material: Iron, cement
- Total length: 288.35 m (946 ft)
- Width: 14 m (46 ft)
- No. of spans: 5 (old)

History
- Construction end: 1924 (old)
- Construction cost: Rs.2.6 billion
- Inaugurated: 22 March 2013 (new)

Statistics
- Daily traffic: 10,000 per day (approx)

Location
- Interactive map of Kallady Bridge

Kallady Bridge (Tamil: கல்லடிப் பாலம்; also known as the Lady Manning Bridge) is a road bridge in eastern Sri Lanka. It crosses the Batticaloa Lagoon at Batticaloa. The bridge is part of the A4 Colombo-Batticaloa highway.

== History ==
The bridge was built in 1924 during British colonial rule. The bridge was named Lady Manning Bridge in honour of the wife of William Manning, the British Governor of Ceylon. It was the oldest and longest iron bridge in Sri Lanka. On average 10,000 vehicles crossed the narrow, single lane bridge daily. Accidents on the bridge would lead to traffic problems in the area.

Batticaloa's singing fish legend is associated with the bridge. In 1954 two American priests from St. Michael's College National School, Rev. Fr. Lang and Rev. Fr. Moran, recorded fishes singing under the bridge. The recording was broadcast on Radio Ceylon in the 1960s.

In 2006 plans were drawn to build a new bridge parallel to the old one. Construction of the new bridge began in March 2008. Problems with the contractor led to another contractor being appointed. The new bridge was formally opened on 22 March 2013.

The new two lane bridge is 288.35 m (946 ft) long and 14 m (46 ft) wide. The bridge cost Rs. 2.6 billion (US$20 million) and was financed by a loan from the Japan International Cooperation Agency under the Pro-Poor Eastern Infrastructure Development Project.
