= Kattankudy Division 3 Grama Niladhari Division =

Kattankudy Division 3
- Coordinates: 7.680759°N 81.726735°E
- Country: Sri Lanka
- Province: Western Province
- District: Batticaloa District
- Divisional Secretariat: Kattankudy Divisional Secretariat
- Electoral District: Batticaloa Electoral District
- Polling Division: Paddiruppu Polling Division

Population (2012)
  - Total: 1,323
- ISO 3166 code: LK-5124040

Kattankudy Division 3 Grama Niladhari Division

Kattankudy Division 3 Grama Niladhari Division is a Grama Niladhari Division of the Kattankudy Divisional Secretariat, of Batticaloa District, of Eastern Province, Sri Lanka.

== Demographics ==
=== Ethnicity ===
Kattankudy Division 3 by Ethnicity
1. Sinhalese (0%)
2. Sri Lankan Tamil (0%)
3. Indian Tamil (0.1%)
4. Moor (99.9%)
5. Malay (0%)
6. Burgher (0%)
7. Chetty (0%)
8. Bharatha (0%)
9. Others (0%)

=== Religion ===
Kattankudy Division 3 by Religion
1. Buddhist (0%)
2. Hindu (0%)
3. Islam (100%)
4. Roman Catholic (0%)
5. Other Christian (0%)
6. Others (0%)
