= Iyankerny Tamil Grama Niladhari Division =

Iyankerny Tamil
- Grama Niladhari Division
- Interactive map of Iyankerny Tamil
- Coordinates: 7.795311°N 81.600932°E
- Country: Sri Lanka
- Province: Eastern Province
- District: Batticaloa District
- Divisional Secretariat: Eravur Pattu Divisional Secretariat
- Electoral District: Batticaloa Electoral District
- Polling Division: Batticaloa Polling Division

Area
  - Total: 1.83 km^{2} (0.71 sq mi)
- Elevation: 0 m (0 ft)

Population (2012)
  - Total: 2,644
  - Density: 1,445/km^{2} (3,740/sq mi)
- ISO 3166 code: LK-5112050

Iyankerny Tamil

Iyankerny Tamil Grama Niladhari Division is a Grama Niladhari Division of the Eravur Pattu Divisional Secretariat of Batticaloa District of Eastern Province, Sri Lanka. It has Grama Niladhari Division Code 193C.

Iyankerny Tamil is a surrounded by the Chenkalady 1, Thalavai, Iyankerny Muslim, Eravur 03, Ellainagar, Chenkalady 2, Kommathurai East, Kommathurai North and Kaluvankerny 2 Grama Niladhari Divisions.

== Demographics ==
=== Ethnicity ===
The Iyankerny Tamil Grama Niladhari Division has a Sri Lankan Tamil majority (92.4%). In comparison, the Eravur Pattu Divisional Secretariat (which contains the Iyankerny Tamil Grama Niladhari Division) has a Sri Lankan Tamil majority (80.0%) and a significant Moor population (16.8%)

Ethnicity in Iyankerny Tamil
1. Sri Lankan Tamil (92.4%)
2. Moor (6.90%)
3. Other (0.80%)

=== Religion ===
The Iyankerny Tamil Grama Niladhari Division has a Hindu majority (74.8%) and a significant Other Christian population (14.6%). In comparison, the Eravur Pattu Divisional Secretariat (which contains the Iyankerny Tamil Grama Niladhari Division) has a Hindu majority (71.3%) and a significant Muslim population (16.8%)

Religion in Iyankerny Tamil
1. Hindu (74.8%)
2. Other Christian (14.6%)
3. Muslim (7.00%)
4. Roman Catholic (3.50%)
5. Other (0.20%)
