= Koralai Pattu South Divisional Secretariat =

- Divisional Secretariat
- Country: Sri Lanka
- Province: Eastern Province
- District: Batticaloa District
- Time zone: UTC+5:30 (Sri Lanka Standard Time)

Koralai Pattu South Divisional Secretariat is a Divisional Secretariat of Batticaloa District, of Eastern Province, Sri Lanka.

== Demography-Religion ==
Religion in Koralai Pattu South DS Division (2012)
1. Buddhist (0.50%)
2. Hindu (92.9%)
3. Muslim (0.10%)
4. Roman Catholic (0.90%)
5. Other Christian (5.60%)
6. Other (0.00%)
