= Batticaloa Lagoon =

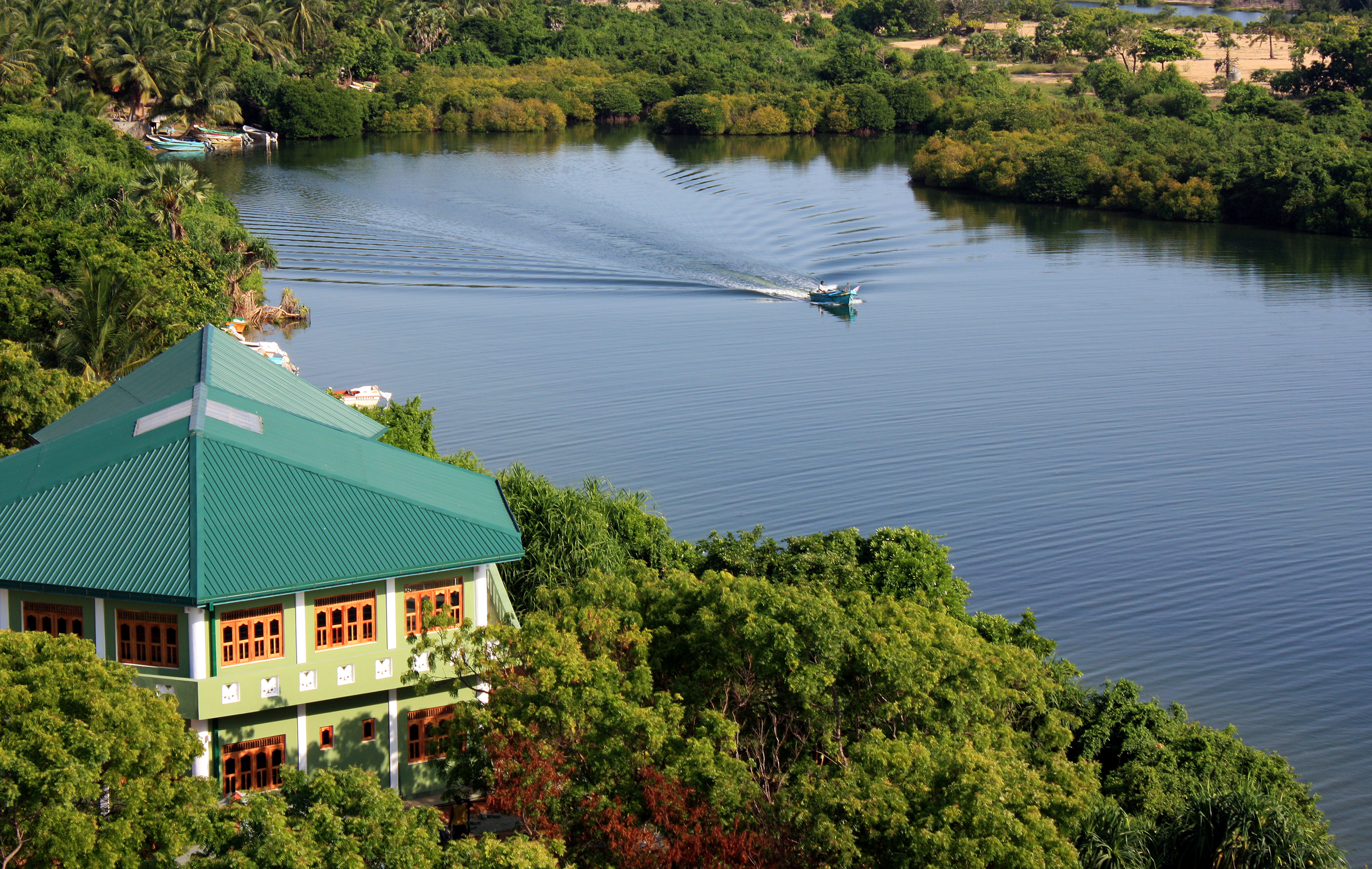
- Palameenmadu, Batticaloa lagoon

- Location within Sri Lanka
- Location: Batticaloa District, Sri Lanka
- Coordinates: 7°34′N 81°41′E
- Type: Lagoon
- Primary outflows: Indian Ocean
- Surface area: 141.18 square kilometres (54.51 sq mi)
- Max. depth: 4 metres (13 ft)
- Surface elevation: Sea level
- Islands: Bone Island, Buffalo Island, Challitivu, Mantivu, Periyativu, Puliyantivu, Serayativu, Siriyativu

Batticaloa Lagoon is a very large estuarine lagoon in Batticaloa District, eastern Sri Lanka. The city of Batticaloa is located on land between the lagoon and the Indian Ocean.Batticaloa district is flourished with three lagoons, such Batticaloa lagoon, Valaichchenai Lagoon and Vakari Lagoon. Among them, Batticaloa lagoon is the largest lagoon in Batticaloa District. Batticaloa lagoon is a long and narrow lagoon situated in the east coast of Sri Lanka with the total area of approximately 11,500 ha of water.

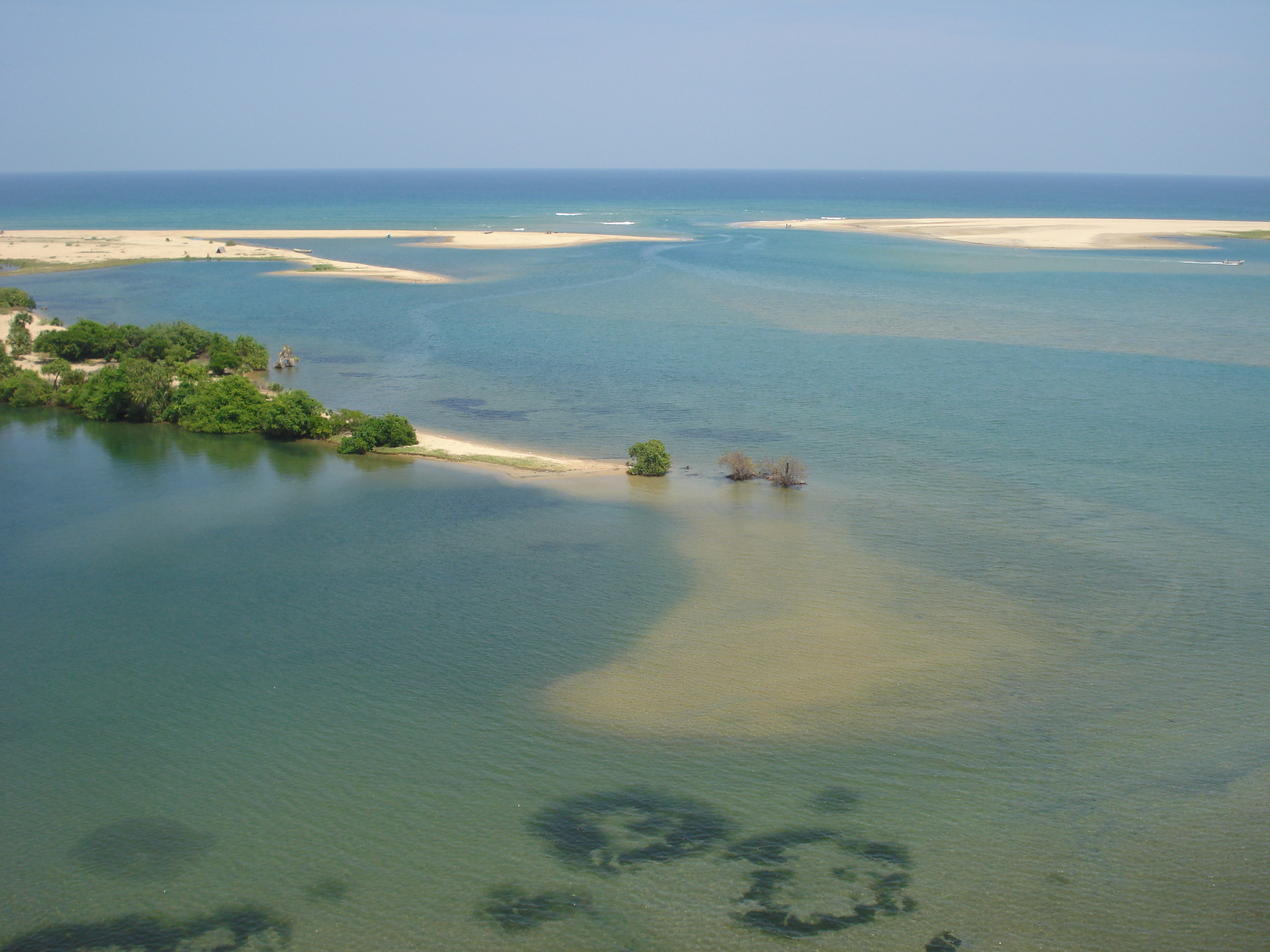
Batticaloa Lagoon opening at Palameenmadu.

The lagoon is 56 km long. This lagoon extends from Eravur (Batticaloa district) in the north to Kalmunai (Ampara district) in the south. This lagoon opens into the sea at two points. One in the southern end of the lagoon at Kallar and the other is midway of the lagoon at Palameenmadu which is close to the Batticaloa town. Both are narrow and approximately 200 m wide. The width of the water flow at their openings varies with the seasons. During the dry season the width of the bar mouth of the lagoon decreases and gradually it get closed with the onset of the north east monsoon which piles up the sand bar by the end of dry season. Later with the rains and with the lagoon mouth closed.

The lagoon is fed by a number of small rivers. It is linked to the sea by a two narrow channels, one at Batticaloa and the other at Periyakallar. During the dry season these channels are blocked by sand bars.

The lagoon is surrounded by a densely populated region used for cultivating rice, coconut and other crops. The surrounding land is used for shrimp farming and rice cultivation.

The lagoon has extensive mangrove swamps and some sea grass beds. The lagoon attracts a wide variety of water birds.

== Gallery ==
Batticaloa Lagoon

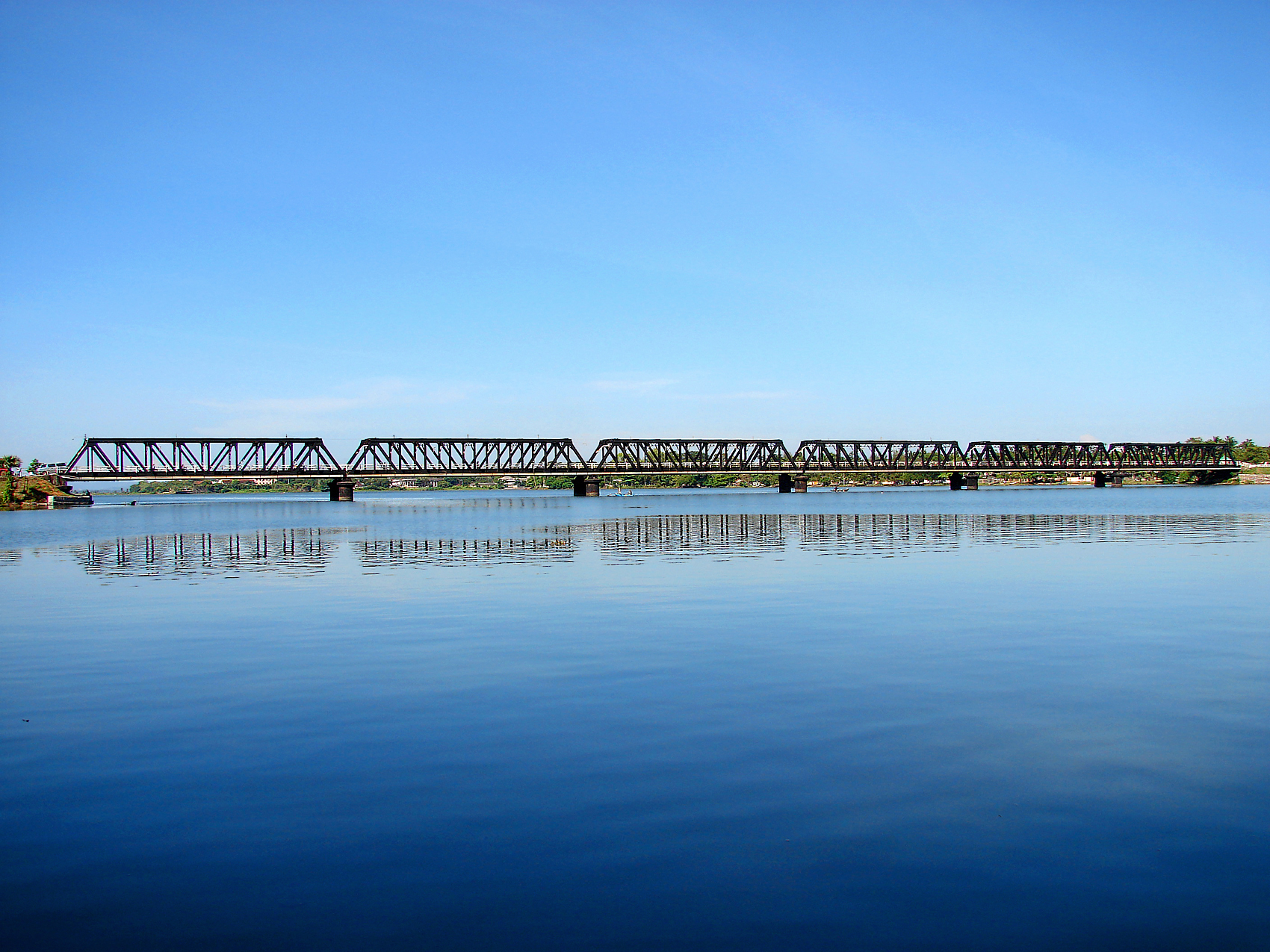
Kallady Bridge, over Batticaloa lagoon

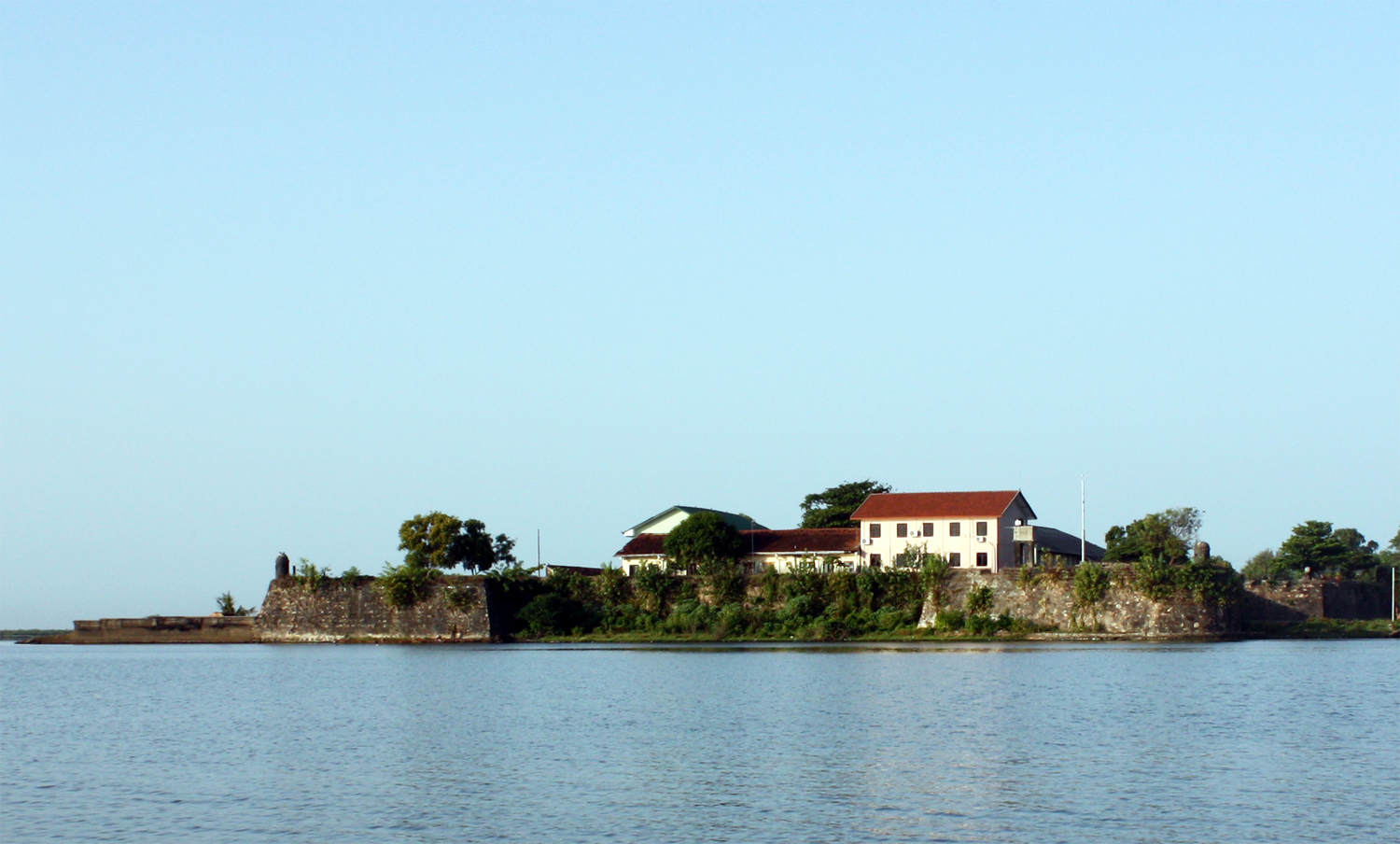
Batticaloa Portuguese and Dutch Fort, near Batticaloa lagoon

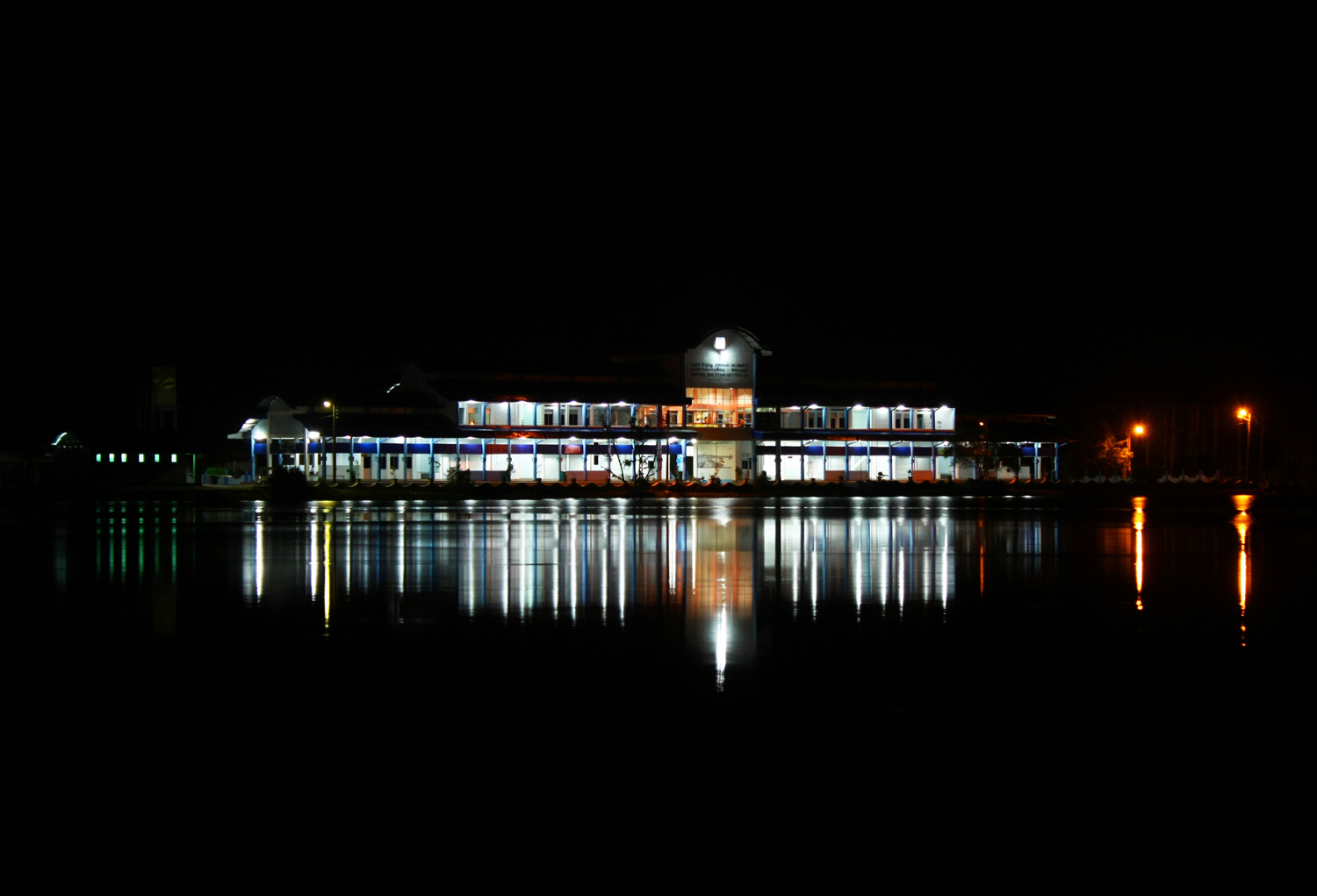
Batticaloa bus stand reflects on Batticaloa lagoon

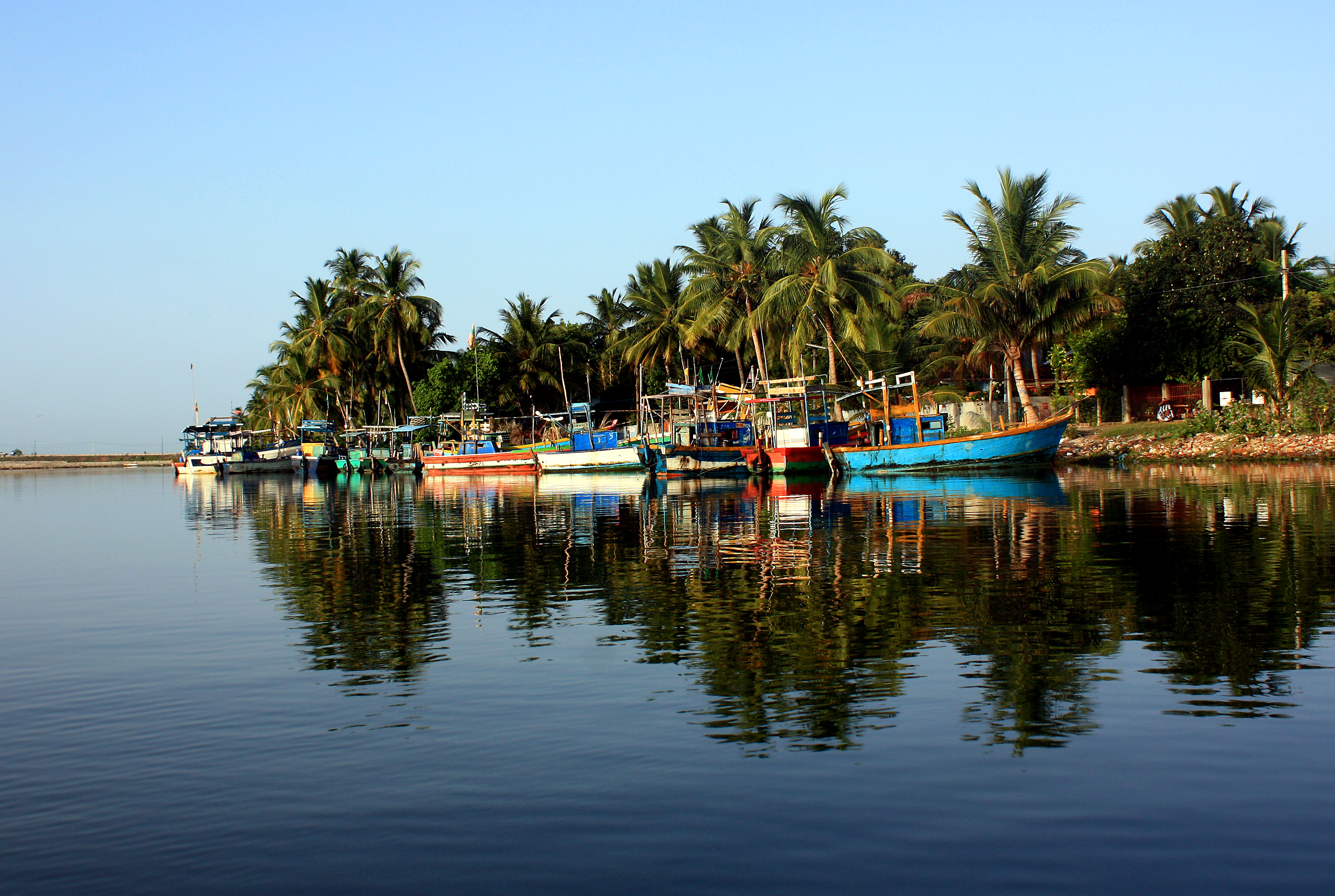
Resting fishing boats on Batticaloa lagoon

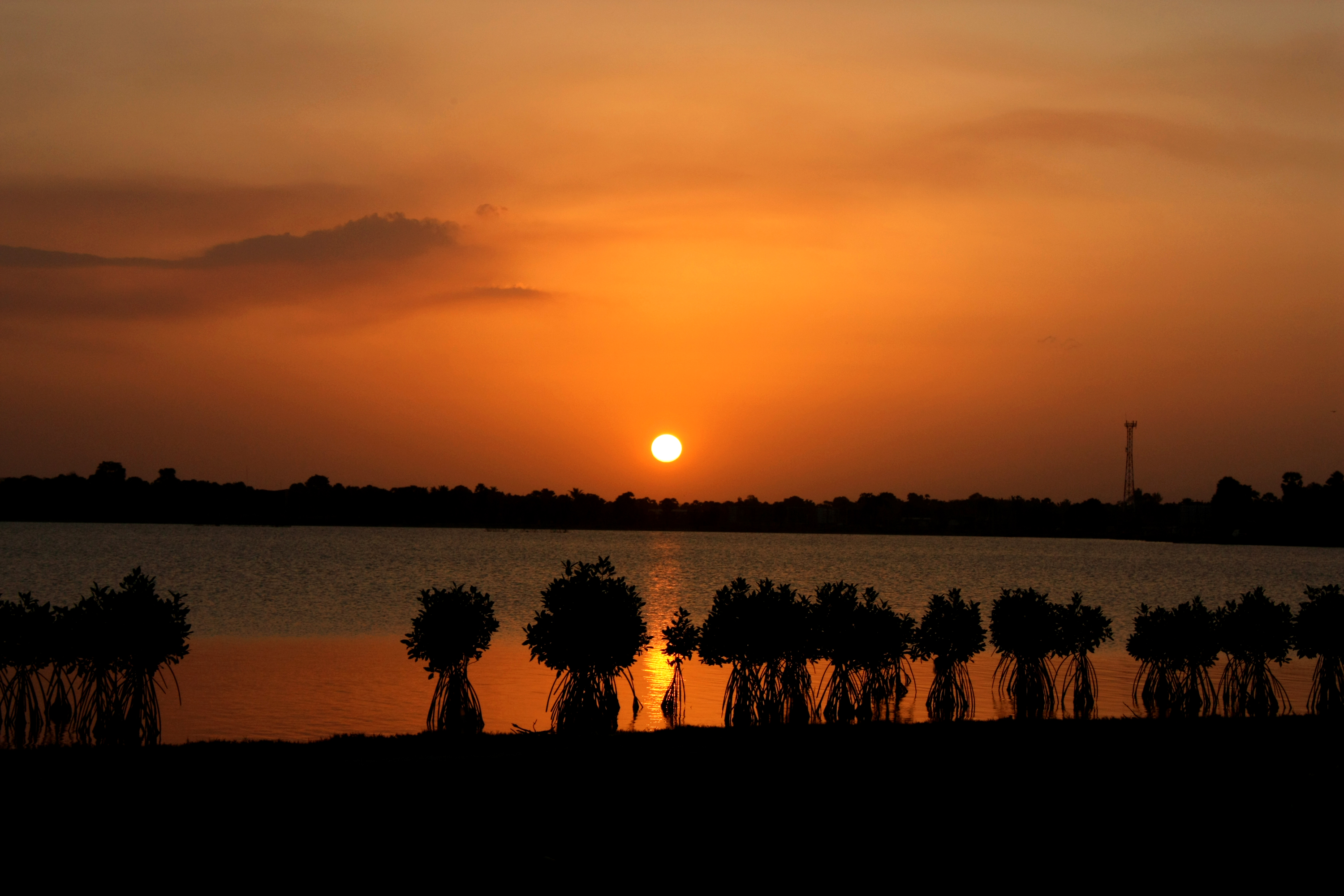
Sunset view in Poompuhar over Batticaloa lagoon

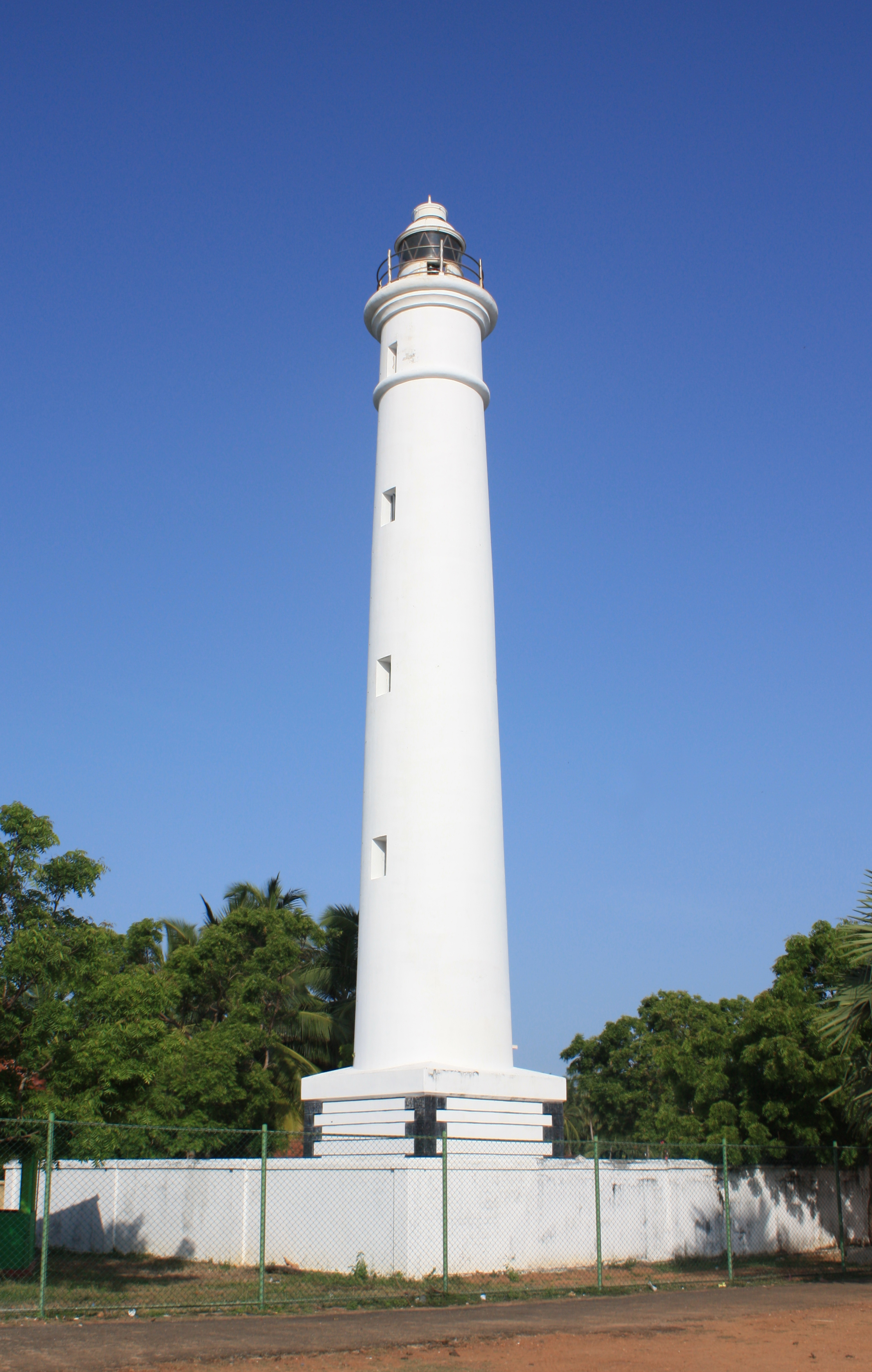
Batticaloa lighthouse in Palameenmadu
