= Koralai Pattu Divisional Secretariat =

- Divisional Secretariat
- Country: Sri Lanka
- Province: Eastern Province
- District: Batticaloa District
- Time zone: UTC+5:30 (Sri Lanka Standard Time)

Koralai Pattu Divisional Secretariat is a Divisional Secretariat of Batticaloa District, of Eastern Province, Sri Lanka.

== Demography-Religion ==
Religion in Koralai Pattu DS Division (2012)
1. Buddhist (1.20%)
2. Hindu (80.3%)
3. Muslim (0.30%)
4. Roman Catholic (4.10%)
5. Other Christian (14.0%)
6. Other (0.00%)
