= Koralai Pattu West Divisional Secretariat =

- Divisional Secretariat
- Country: Sri Lanka
- Province: Eastern Province
- District: Batticaloa District
- Time zone: UTC+5:30 (Sri Lanka Standard Time)

Koralai Pattu West Divisional Secretariat is a Divisional Secretariat of Batticaloa District, of Eastern Province, Sri Lanka.

== Demography-Religion ==
Religion in Koralai Pattu West DS Division (2012)
1. Buddhist (0.10%)
2. Hindu (0.30%)
3. Muslim (99.5%)
4. Roman Catholic (0.00%)
5. Other Christian (0.00%)
6. Other (0.00%)
