= Manmunai West Divisional Secretariat =

- Divisional Secretariat
- Country: Sri Lanka
- Province: Eastern Province
- District: Batticaloa District
- Time zone: UTC+5:30 (Sri Lanka Standard Time)

Manmunai West Divisional Secretariat is a Divisional Secretariat of Batticaloa District, of Eastern Province, Sri Lanka.

== Demography-Religion ==
Religion in Manmunai West DS Division (2012)
1. Buddhist (0.70%)
2. Hindu (97.2%)
3. Muslim (0.10%)
4. Roman Catholic (0.90%)
5. Other Christian (1.20%)
6. Other (0.00%)
