= Eravur Town Divisional Secretariat =

- Divisional Secretariat
- Interactive map of Eravur Town Divisional Secretariat
- Country: Sri Lanka
- Province: Eastern Province
- District: Batticaloa District
- Time zone: UTC+5:30 (Sri Lanka Standard Time)

Eravur Town Divisional Secretariat is a Divisional Secretariat of Batticaloa District, of Eastern Province, Sri Lanka.

== Demography-Religion ==
Religion in Eravur Town DS Division (2012)
1. Buddhist (0.80%)
2. Hindu (12.4%)
3. Muslim (85.4%)
4. Roman Catholic (0.70%)
5. Other Christian (0.60%)
6. Other (0.00%)
