= Koralai Pattu North Divisional Secretariat =

Koralai Pattu North Divisional Secretariat කෝරලේ පත්තු උතුර ප්‍රාදේශීය ලේකම් කාර්යාලය වාකරේ
- Divisional Secretariat
- Country: Sri Lanka
- Province: Eastern Province
- District: Batticaloa District
- Time zone: UTC+5:30 (Sri Lanka Standard Time)

Koralai Pattu North Divisional Secretariat is a Divisional Secretariat of Batticaloa District, of Eastern Province, Sri Lanka.

== Demography-Religion ==
Religion in Koralai Pattu North DS Division (2012)
1. Buddhist (1.10%)
2. Hindu (80.6%)
3. Muslim (3.20%)
4. Roman Catholic (3.00%)
5. Other Christian (12.1%)
6. Other (0.00%)
