= Manmunai North Divisional Secretariat =

- Divisional Secretariat
- Interactive map of Manmunai North Divisional Secretariat
- Country: Sri Lanka
- Province: Eastern Province
- District: Batticaloa District
- Time zone: UTC+5:30 (Sri Lanka Standard Time)

Manmunai North Divisional Secretariat is a Divisional Secretariat of Batticaloa District, of Eastern Province, Sri Lanka.

== Demography-Religion ==
Religion in Manmunai North DS Division (2012)
1. Buddhist (1.50%)
2. Hindu (65.0%)
3. Muslim (5.30%)
4. Roman Catholic (19.0%)
5. Other Christian (9.20%)
6. Other (0.00%)
