= Manmunai South & Eruvil Pattu Divisional Secretariat =

- Divisional Secretariat
- Country: Sri Lanka
- Province: Eastern Province
- District: Batticaloa District
- Time zone: UTC+5:30 (Sri Lanka Standard Time)

Manmunai South & Eruvil Pattu Divisional Secretariat is a Divisional Secretariat of Batticaloa District, of Eastern Province, Sri Lanka.

== Demography-Religion ==
Religion in Manmunai South & Eruvil Pattu DS Division (2012)
1. Buddhist (0.40%)
2. Hindu (93.9%)
3. Muslim (0.00%)
4. Roman Catholic (2.60%)
5. Other Christian (3.00%)
6. Other (0.00%)
