= Eravur Pattu Divisional Secretariat =

- Divisional Secretariat
- Country: Sri Lanka
- Province: Eastern Province
- District: Batticaloa District
- Time zone: UTC+5:30 (Sri Lanka Standard Time)

Eravur Pattu Divisional Secretariat is a Divisional Secretariat of Batticaloa District, of Eastern Province, Sri Lanka.

== Demography-Religion ==
Religion in Eravur Pattu DS Division (2012)
1. Buddhist (2.80%)
2. Hindu (71.3%)
3. Muslim (16.8%)
4. Roman Catholic (3.90%)
5. Other Christian (5.20%)
6. Other (0.00%)
