= Kattankudy Divisional Secretariat =

- Divisional Secretariat
- Interactive map of Kattankudy Divisional Secretariat
- Country: Sri Lanka
- Province: Eastern Province
- District: Batticaloa District
- Time zone: UTC+5:30 (Sri Lanka Standard Time)

Kattankudy Divisional Secretariat is a Divisional Secretariat of Batticaloa District, of Eastern Province, Sri Lanka.

== Demography-Religion ==
Religion in Kattankudy DS Division (2012)
1. Buddhist (0.10%)
2. Hindu (0.10%)
3. Muslim (99.7%)
4. Roman Catholic (0.00%)
5. Other Christian (0.00%)
6. Other (0.00%)

== GS Divisions and Population (2014) ==
| GS Number | Area | Total Families | Population |
|---|---|---|---|
| 162 | Kattankudy-6 | 922 | 3049 |
| 162A | Kattankudy-6 South | 921 | 3218 |
| 162B | Kattankudy-6 West | 622 | 2121 |
| 164 | Kattankudy-4 | 376 | 1295 |
| 164A | Kattankudy-5 | 631 | 2195 |
| 164B | Kattankudy-5 South | 303 | 982 |
| 164C | Kattankudy-5 West | 440 | 1532 |
| 165 | Kattankudy-3 | 458 | 1387 |
| 165A | Kattankudy-3 West | 318 | 955 |
| 165B | Kattankudy-3 East | 421 | 1422 |
| 166 | Kattankudy-2 | 671 | 2345 |
| 166A | Kattankudy-2 North | 777 | 2685 |
| 167 | Kattankudy-1 | 353 | 1178 |
| 167A | New Kattankudy North | 1624 | 5429 |
| 167B | New Kattankudy East | 2016 | 7847 |
| 167C | New Kattankudy South | 1567 | 5485 |
| 167D | New Kattankudy West | 697 | 2429 |
| 167E | Kattankudy-1 South | 641 | 2052 |

Source: http://www.kattankudy.ds.gov.lk
