= Batticaloa District =

Batticaloa District மட்டக்களப்பு மாவட்டம் මඩකලපුව දිස්ත්‍රික්කය
- Administrative District
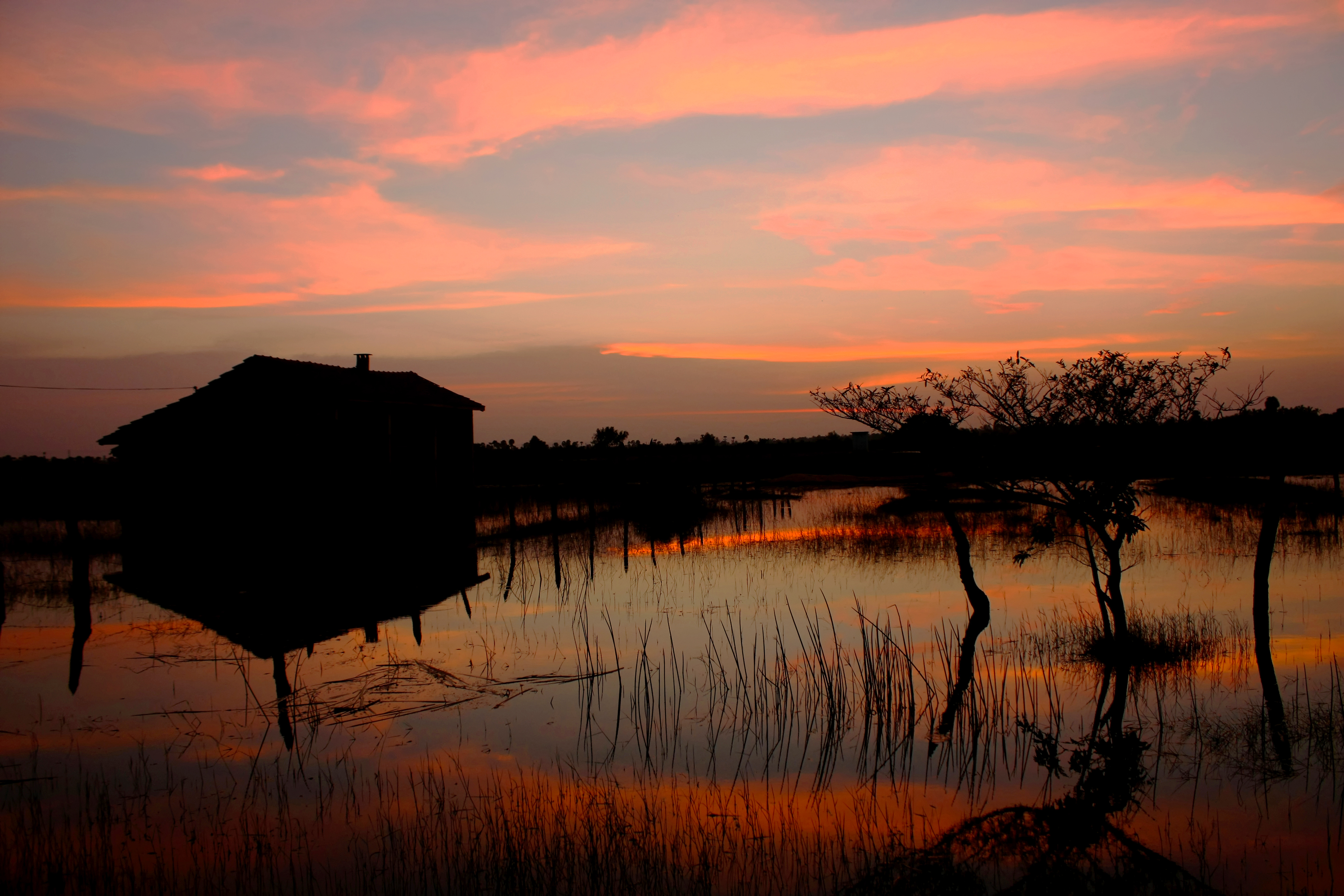
- Sunset at Kumburumoolai

- Location within Sri Lanka

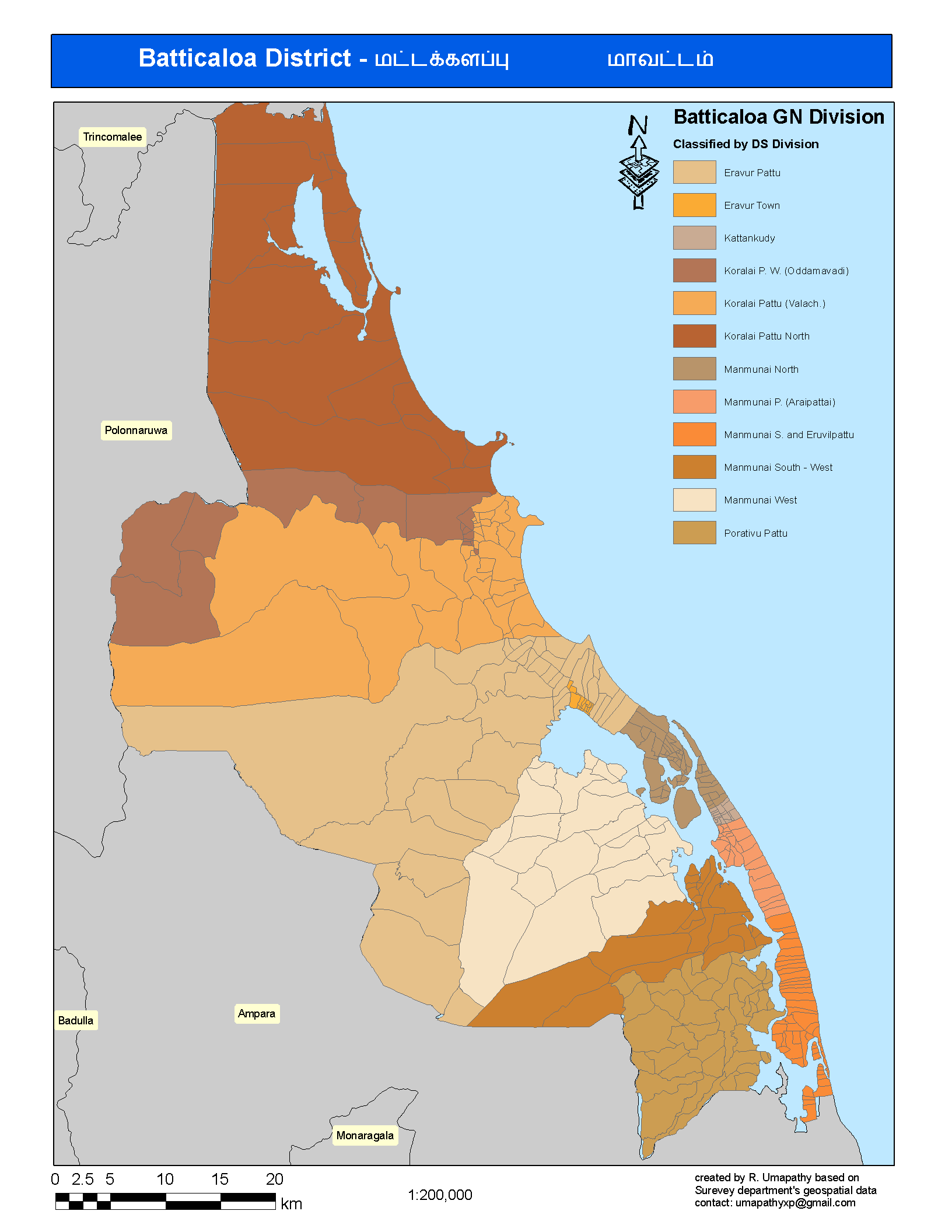
- Administrative units of Batticaloa District in 2007
- Coordinates: 07°50′N 81°20′E
- Country: Sri Lanka
- Province: Eastern
- Capital: Batticaloa
- DS Division: List: Eravurpattu; Eravur Town; Kattankudy; Koralaipattu; Koralaipattu Central; Koralaipattu North; Koralaipattu South; Koralaipattu West; Manmunai North; Manmunaipattu; Manmunai S & Eruvilpattu; Manmunai South West; Manmunai West; Porativupattu

Government
  - District Secretary: Kalamathi Pathmaraja
  - MPs: List: S. Viyalendran; Nazeer Ahamed; G. Karunaharan; S. Chanthirakantyan; Sanakkitan Rajaputhiran
  - MPCs: List: Ali Ameer; S. Chandrakanthan; N. Indirakumar; G. Karunakaran; G. Krishnapillai; M. Nadarajah; A. F. M. Shibly; M. S. Subair; K. Thurairajasingam; R. Thurairatnam; A. N. Zainulabdeen

Area
  - Total: 2,854 km^{2} (1,102 sq mi)
  - Land: 2,610 km^{2} (1,010 sq mi)
  - Water: 244 km^{2} (94 sq mi) 8.55%
  - Rank: 9th (4.35% of total area)

Population (2012 census)
  - Total: 525,142
  - Rank: 17th (2.59% of total pop.)
  - Density: 201/km^{2} (521/sq mi)

Ethnicity (2012 census)
  - Sri Lankan Tamil: 381,285 (72.61%)
  - Moor: 133,844 (25.49%)
  - Sinhalese: 6,127 (1.17%)
  - Burgher: 2,794 (0.53%)
  - Other: 1,092 (0.21%)

Religion (2012 census)
  - Hindu: 338,983 (64.55%)
  - Muslim: 133,939 (25.51%)
  - Christian: 46,300 (8.82%)
  - Buddhist: 5,787 (1.10%)
  - Other: 133 (0.03%)
- Time zone: UTC+05:30 (Sri Lanka)
- Post Codes: 30000-30999
- Telephone Codes: 065
- ISO 3166 code: LK-51
- Vehicle registration: EP
- Official Languages: Tamil, Sinhala
- Website: Batticaloa District Secretariat

Batticaloa District (Tamil: மட்டக்களப்பு மாவட்டம் Maṭṭakkaḷappu Māvaṭṭam; Sinhala: මඩකලපුව දිස්ත්‍රික්කය maḍakalapuva distrikkaya) is one of the 25 districts of Sri Lanka, the second level administrative division of the country. The district is administered by a District Secretariat headed by a District Secretary (previously known as a Government Agent) appointed by the central government of Sri Lanka. The capital of the district is the city of Batticaloa. Ampara District was carved out of the southern part of Batticaloa District in April 1961.

== Geography ==
Batticaloa District is located in the east of Sri Lanka in the Eastern Province. It has an area of 2,854 square kilometres (1,102 sq mi).

=== Administrative units ===
Batticaloa District is divided into 14 Divisional Secretary's Division (DS Divisions), each headed by a Divisional Secretary (previously known as an Assistant Government Agent). The DS Divisions are further sub-divided into 346 Grama Niladhari Divisions (GN Divisions).

DS Division	Main Town	Divisional Secretary	GN Divisions	Area (km^{2})	Population (2012 Census)						Population Density (/km^{2})
DS Division	Main Town	Divisional Secretary	GN Divisions	Area (km^{2})	Sri Lankan Tamil	Sri Lankan Moors	Sinhalese	Burgher	Other	Total	Population Density (/km^{2})
Eravurpattu	Chenkalady	U. Uthayashreethar	39	695	60,278	12,617	2,040	119	82	75,136	108
Eravur Town	Eravur	S. L. M. Haneefa	15	3	3,287	21,075	191	69	10	24,632	8,211
Kattankudy	Kattankudy	S. H. Muzammil	18	6	14	40,201	11	0	11	40,237	6,706
Koralaipattu	Valaichchenai	T. Dinesh	12	35	22,799	77	339	82	20	23,317	666
Koralaipattu Central	Pasikudah	Nihara Mowjood	9	80	583	24,961	57	36	6	25,643	320
Koralaipattu North	Vakarai	S. R. Rahulanayahi	16	589	20,519	698	288	5	2	21,512	37
Koralaipattu South	Kiran	K. Thanapalasundaram	18	582	25,820	18	87	0	136	26,061	45
Koralaipattu West	Oddamavadi	M. C. Ansar	8	17	65	22,070	7	0	2	22,144	1,303
Manmunai North	Batticaloa	Srineevasan Gridaran	48	68	76,898	4,569	1,340	2,473	748	86,028	1,265
Manmunaipattu	Araiyampathy	V. Arulrajah	27	37	22,994	7,520	35	2	32	30,583	827
Manmunai South & Eruvilpattu	Kaluvanchikudy	S. Suthakar	45	63	60,457	12	192	5	28	60,694	963
Manmunai South West	Kokkadichcholai	V. Thavarajah	24	145	23,653	5	1,005	1	9	24,673	170
Manmunai West	Vavunathivu	V. Thavarajah	24	352	28,199	13	180	0	0	28,392	81
Porativupattu	Vellavely	Nallaiya Vilvaretnam	43	182	35,719	8	355	2	6	36,090	198
Total			346	2,854	381,285	133,844	6,127	2,794	1,092	525,142	184

== Demographics ==
=== Population ===
Batticaloa District's population was 525,142 in 2012. The population of the district is mostly Sri Lankan Tamil.

The population of the district, like the rest of the east and north, was affected by the civil war. The war killed an estimated 100,000 people. Several hundred thousand Sri Lankan Tamils, possibly as many as one million, emigrated to the West during the war. Many Sri Lankan Tamils also moved to the relative safety of the capital Colombo. The war also caused many people from all ethnic and religious groups who lived in the district to flee to other parts of Sri Lanka, though most of them have returned to the district since the end of the civil war.

=== Ethnicity ===
Population of Batticaloa District by ethnic group 1881 to 2012
Year	Tamil (Note: Sri Lankan Tamil and Indian Tamil.)		Moor (Note: Sri Lankan Moors and Indian Moors)		Sinhalese		Other		Total No.
Year	No.	%	No.	%	No.	%	No.	%	Total No.
1881 Census	61,014	57.80%	37,255	35.29%	5,012	4.75%	2,277	2.16%	105,558
1891 Census	69,584	56.71%	44,780	36.50%	6,403	5.22%	1,932	1.57%	122,699
1901 Census	79,857	55.01%	54,190	37.33%	7,575	5.22%	3,539	2.44%	145,161
1911 Census	83,948	54.53%	60,695	39.43%	5,771	3.75%	3,529	2.29%	153,943
1921 Census	84,665	53.35%	63,146	39.79%	7,243	4.56%	3,655	2.30%	158,709
1946 Census	102,264	50.33%	85,805	42.23%	11,850	5.83%	3,267	1.61%	203,186
1953 Census	130,381	48.20%	106,706	39.45%	31,174	11.52%	2,232	0.83%	270,493
1963 Census (Note: Ampara District was carved out of Batticaloa District in 1961.)	141,110	71.93%	46,038	23.47%	6,715	3.42%	2,326	1.19%	196,189
1971 Census	181,527	70.71%	60,889	23.72%	11,548	4.50%	2,757	1.07%	256,721
1981 Census	237,787	71.98%	78,829	23.86%	11,255	3.41%	2,462	0.75%	330,333
2001 Census	n/a	n/a	n/a	n/a	n/a	n/a	n/a	n/a	n/a
2007 Enumeration	381,984	74.05%	128,964	25.00%	2,397	0.46%	2,512	0.49%	515,857
2012 Census	382,300	72.80%	133,844	25.49%	6,127	1.17%	2,871	0.55%	525,142

=== Religion ===
Population of Batticaloa District by religion 1981 to 2012
Year	Hindu		Islam		Christian (Note: Roman Catholic and Other Christian.)		Buddhist		Others		Total No.
Year	No.	%	No.	%	No.	%	No.	%	No.	%	Total No.
1981 Census	218,812	66.24%	78,810	23.86%	23,499	7.11%	9,127	2.76%	85	0.03%	330,333
2012 Census	338,983	64.55%	133,939	25.51%	46,300	8.82%	5,787	1.10%	133	0.03%	525,142

=== Poverty ===
In 2016 the district was one of the poorest in Sri Lanka and had the fourth-highest incidence of extreme poverty according to the World Bank.

== Politics and government ==
=== Local government ===
Batticaloa District has 12 local authorities of which one is a Municipal Council, two are Urban Councils and the remaining nine are Divisional Councils (Pradesha Sabhai or Pradeshiya Sabha).

Local Authority	Area	Population	Registered Electors (2008) (Note: 2011 for Eravur Urban Council, Kattankudy Urban Council and Koralaipattu West Divisional Council.)	Elected Members (2008) (Note: 2011 for Eravur Urban Council, Kattankudy Urban Council and Koralaipattu West Divisional Council.)					
Local Authority	Area	Population	Registered Electors (2008)	TMVP	UPFA	SLMC	UNP	Other	Total
Batticaloa Municipal Council			54,948	0	11	1	0	7	19
Eravurpattu Divisional Council	585.70	77,203	45,336	10	1	2	0	1	14
Eravur Urban Council	4.90	40,819	16,522	0	6	2	0	1	9
Kattankudy Urban Council	6.50	46,597	26,454	0	6	1	0	2	9
Koralaipattu Divisional Council	242.00	125,000	41,858	6	2	2	0	1	11
Koralaipattu North Divisional Council	645.00	21,202	12,419	10	1	0	0	0	11
Koralaipattu West Divisional Council	25.00	29,614	17,885	0	7	1	1	0	9
Manmunaipattu Divisional Council	21.50	30,218	18,759	7	0	2	0	0	9
Manmunai South & Eruvilpattu Divisional Council	44.17	70,256	38,386	7	0	0	0	3	10
Manmunai South West Divisional Council	161.60	25,279	14,880	8	0	0	0	1	9
Manmunai West Divisional Council	292.65	30,026	15,771	6	0	0	0	3	9
Porativupattu Divisional Council	176.00	49,066	28,116	7	0	0	0	2	9
Total				61	34	11	1	21	128
