= List of Archaeological Protected Monuments in Kegalle District =

This is a list of Archaeological Protected Monuments in Kegalle District, Sri Lanka.

Monument	Image	Location	Grama Niladhari Division	Divisional Secretary's Division	Registered	Description	Refs
Aluth Nuwara Devalaya ruins		Lewke Dodantale		Mawanella	2 May 1975	Aluth Nuwara Devalaya, Inscriptions, Patthirippuwa, Giruwa Ambalama	
Ambalena Cave		Malandeniya	Pitadeniya	Warakapola	6 June 2008	Drip-ledged rock caves with prehistoric evidence and the site with buildings	
Asmadala Boduralla Henwatta ruins			Asmadala	Aranayaka	22 October 2010	Drip-ledged cave with rock inscription	
Asmadala Galgoda Henawatta ruins			Asmadala	Aranayaka	22 October 2010	Drip-ledged cave and cave with signs	
Asmadala Lunumidella reservation			Asmadala	Aranayaka	22 October 2010	Drip-ledged stone cave	
Asmadala Vihara		Asmadala		Aranayaka	8 July 2005	Tempita Vihara	
Asokarama Forest Hermitage		Kothapaluwa and Ranwala	No. 78-C, Kothapalukanda	Warakapola	6 June 2008	All the drip ledged rock caves and inscriptions in the premises	
Athnawala watta ruins		Niwatuwa		Warakapola	8 July 2005	Two drip ledged caves	
Atthanagoda Tempita Vihara		Atthanagoda		Mawanella	28 January 1977		
Beligala Mountain ruins		Beligala		Rambukkana	28 December 1973	Archaeological ruins and inscriptions	
Beligala Rock ruins		Beligala		Warakapola	28 December 1973	Rock inscriptions and other ruins	
Beligala Vijayasundararama Vihara		Beligala		Warakapola	1 November 1946		
Beligammana Raja Maha Vihara		Beligammana		Mawanella	7 December 2001	Pothgul Vihara	
Belilena		Kitulgala		Yatiyanthota	22 November 2002	Pre-Historic cave	
Berendi Kovil			No. 118, Pahalathalduuwa	Dehiovita	23 February 2007	Stone bridge on the way to historic Berandi Kovila	
Bibile Oya Pilimalena Vihara			Gonagamuwa	Warakapola	24 July 2009	The cave with the drip-ledged cave inscription and two drip-ledged caves	
Bisowela Purana Gallen Vihara		Bisowela		Galigamuwa	8 July 2005	The drip ledged cave with cave inscription	
Bodhawela ruins		Bodhawela	Egalla	Warakapola	23 January 2009	The five drip ledged rock caves situated at Dorowwa (Lower/Upper)	
Bodhirukkarama Purana Vihara		Kempitikanda	Digana Kanda	Rambukkana	24 July 2009	The Tampita Image House (Image house on stone piles)	
Budulena Gala Raja Maha Vihara		Yatimahana	No. 23-C-Yatimahana	Mawanella	6 June 2008	Statue house with paintings and sculptures, drip-ledged cave	
Burunnewa Tempita Vihara		Burunnewa		Warakapola	22 November 2002		
Damunu Kanda Mukalana and Neeraviya Hena ruins		Udagala Deniya	No. 2D Dambulla	Rambukkana	30 December 2011	Places depicting pre-historic features, the drains made in the natural rock, old pillar holes, godeli in ruins, other archaeological features situated in the land called Damunu Kanda Mukalana and the pillar and the archaeological features such as pillar foundation found in the land called Neeraviya Hena	
Danagirigala Purana Raja Maha Vihara		Dodantale		Mawanella	26 August		
Dawson's Rest House		Kurunthuhinna	Meepitiya	Kegalle	6 June 2008		
Dedigama, Galtenovitawatta ruins			No. 86, Dedigama, Dambulla	Warakapola	30 December 2011	The Building in ruins situated in the area called Dedigama, Galtenovitawatta	
Dedigama Maha Walauwa			Dedigama	Warakapola	24 July 2009	Dedigama Maha Walauwa and building with a stone pillar consisting of a rock inscription, in the vicinity	
Degalathiriya Galaudathanna Vihara			Athurupana	Kegalle	22 October 2010	Drip-ledged cave	
Delgamuwa, Kovilewatte Devalaya		Delgamuwa, Kovilewatte	Delgamuwa	Warakapola	24 July 2009	Drip-ledged rock cave maintained as a Devale, at the Delgamuwa, Kovilewatte premises	
Deliwala Kotavehera		Deliwala		Rambukkana	15 October 1948		
Deniyatenna Vihara		Talgaspitiya		Aranayaka	8 July 2005	Tempita Vihara	
Devagiri Raja Maha Vihara		Ambepussa		Warakapola	22 November 2002	Image house	
Devalegama Devalaya		Devalegama		Galigamuwa	1 November 1996	Kataragama Devalaya, kitchen and the rampart	
Devanagala Raja Maha Vihara		Devanagalagama		Mawanella	12 December 1941	Buddhist shrine, paintings, sculptures, stone inscription and other ruins	
Dorawaka Lena cave		Dorawaka		Warakapola	22 November 2002	Pre-Historic roak cave	
Egalla mountain ruins			Egalla	Warakapola	22 November 2002	Cave with drip ledges and other ruins	
Elpitiya cave with paintings		Elpitiya	Elpitiya	Warakapola	24 July 2009	Drip-ledged cave with paintings and sculptures	
Eraminiya Gammana Tempita Purana Vihara		Eraminiya		Mawanella	8 July 2005	Tempita Vihara	
Ethulwatta Walawwa			Kumbalgama	Warakapola	22 November 2002		
Galbokka, Weheragala caves			No. 43/C, Galbokka	Aranayaka	22 July 2011	All caves with drip-ledged in the place called Galbokka, Weheragala	
Galgemulahena land ruins		Beligala	Agalla	Warakapola	6 June 2008	The drip ledged rock cave	
Galkande Deniya Kumbura ruins		Kehelwathugoda	No. 75A Kehelwathugoda	Rambukkana	30 December 2011	The Building in ruins	
Gallalla Raja Maha Sath Pathini Dewalaya		Uhangoda	Kekirigoda	Mawanella	6 June 2008	Devala building	
Ganegoda Cave Temple		Ganegoda		Galigamuwa	23 February 1967	Len Vihara	
Ganekanda Raja Maha Vihara		Helamada (Ganekanda)		Galigamuwa	8 July 2005	The cave with drip ledges	
Ginihappitiya Purana Vihara		Ginihappitiya		Mawanella	8 July 2005	Image house with paintings	
Gondiwela Tempita Vihara		Gondiwela		Mawanella	5 May 1967		
Hakurugala Raja Maha Vihara		Nikawalamulla, Hakurugala		Dehiovita	8 July 2005	Cave temple	
Hingula Raja Maha Vihara			Hingula	Mawanella	6 July 2007	Tampita vihara	
Holombuwa ruins		Holombuwa		Galigamuwa	8 July 2005	Cave with scripts	
Hunuwala Raja Maha Vihara			Nangalla	Warakapola	22 November 2002	Len Vihara with drip ledges cave and inscriptions, including other drip ledged caves	
Ihalagodigamuwa Gallenewaththa ruins			No. 46, Godigamuwa	Aranayaka	9 September 2011	Drip-ledged cave in the area Ihalagodigamuwa Gallenewaththa (Pansal Waththa)	
Ihala Kade Asmadala ruins			Amadula	Aranayaka	22 October 2010	Drip-ledged stone cave	
Ihala Mawela Purana Gallen Vihara		Ihala Mawela		Mawanella	1 November 1996	Cave temple	
Ilukgoda Shaila Kanthrama Vihara			Ilukgoda	Mawanella	9 September 2011	Preaching hall and Image house	
Jeewana Raja Maha Vihara			Jeewana	Galigamuwa	22 November 2002	Tempita Vihara	
Jubilee Ambalama		Ruwanwella		Ruwanwella	22 November 2002	Ambalama	
Jubilee Ambalama		Kegalle Town	No. 51E, Pahala Golahela	Dehiovita	22 July 2011		
Kadugannawa Ambalama		Pahala Kadugannawa	Mahakadurawa	Mawanella	22 July 2011		
Kalottuwa Gala Kanda Gallen Vihara		Dooldeniya	No. 42-A, Dooldeniya	Aranayaka	6 June 2008	The Buddha shrine	
Kappatipola Tampita Vihara			No. 23/B, Kappatipola	Mawanella	9 September 2011		
Karandulen Vihara		Nilmalgoda		Kegalle	22 November 2002		
Kariyagama Raja Maha Vihara			Kariyagama	Aranayaka	6 June 2008	The Tampita vihara with the stone pillars nearby and the pillar base	
Kawudugama Vihara		Kawudugma		Kegalle	1 November 1996	Image house with paintings	
Keerahena Gallen Vihara		Keerahena Udabage		Deraniyagala	22 November 2002		
Keerahena Purana Vihara			Keerahena	Warakapola	24 July 2009	The drip-ledged cave Temple (Len Vihara)	
Keerthi Sri Rajasingha Raja Maha Vihara, Rambukkana		Diyasunna		Rambukkana	1 November 1996	Tempita vihara with paintings	
Keerthi Sri Rajasinghe Raja Maha Vihara, Galigamuwa		Harigala Iddamalpana	No. 64 Kinigama	Galigamuwa	30 December 2011	Viharageya	
Kehelwathugoda Galliyadda ruins			Godapola	Galigamuwa	30 December 2011	Ruined godalla and wall	
Keraminiya Raja Maha Vihara		Keraminiya		Mawanella	1 November 1996	Image house with paintings	
Kondagale Vihara			No. 85, Dedigama	Warakapola	30 December 2011	The Old Image House and the drain in the natural rock	
Kuragala Gallen Raja Maha Vihara		Kuragala (Talgaspitiya)		Aranayaka	8 July 2005	Cave temple	
Legam Kotasa ruins			Legama (Thalgama)	Warakapola	23 January 2009	The two drip ledged rock caves situated in the place called “Legam Kotasa”	
Lenakaduwa Vihara			Upper Lenagala	Warakapola	6 June 2008	The drip ledged rock cave	
Levangama Tempita Vihara		Talawatta		Ruwanwella	8 July 2005	Tempita Vihara	
Lewke Walawwa and Buddha shrine		Lewke		Mawanella	3 September 1999		
Mahatulagala Rock Cave		Abidigala	Abidigala	Warakapola	24 July 2009	Mahatulagala drip-ledged rock cave (Gal Lena)	
Mahawatta Purana Vihara			No. 82, Mangedara	Warakapola	22 November 2002	Tempita Vihara	
Makura Vihara		Makura		Kegalle	1 November 1996	Tampita Vihara with paintings	
Malakariya ruins		Hadagama	Kottanwatta	Rambukkana	22 November 2002	Ambanagala rock surface with evidences of buildings and 2 drip ledged caves	
Mampita Purana Gallen Raja Maha Vihara		Mampitagama		Warakapola	8 July 2005	Len Vihara and the preaching hall	
Mangalagama Ambalama		Mangalagama		Rambukkana	15 March 1974		
Maniyangama Raja Maha Vihara		Devalegama		Dehiovita	1 November 1996	Image house with paintings	
Mannagoda Tempita Vihara		Mannagoda		Mawanella	2 November 1958	Tempita Vihara and paintings	
Mawanella Bridge		Mawanella		Mawanella	1 November 1996	British colonial brick bridge at 56th mile stone, crossing the Maha Oya	
Mayurapada Vihara		Moragammana		Aranayaka	8 July 2005	The Tempita vihara, Stupa and dwelling house	
Medagoda Ambalama		Medagoda	Rukkulagama	Mawanella	6 June 2008	Ambalama	
Mediliyagama Raja Maha Vihara		Mediliyagama		Aranayaka	8 July 2005	Tempita vihara with paintings and sculptures, Kataragama Devalaya, Preaching hall and the Ambalama	
Miniyapitiyawatta ruins		Hewadiwela	Nattambura	Rambukkana	30 December 2011	The Chaitiya Godella in ruins situated in the land	
Nawagamuwa Raja Maha Vihara		Udugama		Rambukkana	1 November 1996	Tempita Vihara	
Nevismere Lower Village ruins		Nevismere Lower Village	No. 129-B, Bulathkohupitiya	Bulathkohupitiya	6 June 2008	The drip ledged rock cave	
Nilwakka Raja Maha Vihara		Nilwakka		Kegalle	1 November 1996	Image house with paintings	
Pattini Devalaya, Ambepussa		Ambepussa	Ambepussa	Warakapola	22 November 2002	Cave with Devalaya and other four caves with drip-ledges	
Pattini Devalaya, Holombuwa		Holombuwa		Galigamuwa	8 July 2005		
Pattini Devalaya, Kahawanugoda		Akwatta		Warakapola	22 November 2002		
Pattini Devalaya, Navagamuwa			Navagamuwa	Galigamuwa	22 November 2002	The cave consist of image house and Devalaya, stupa, the drip-ledged cave with dwelling house	
Peelahenawatta ruins		Niwunhella		Ruwanwella	8 July 2005	Two drip ledged caves	
Peherambe ruins			Peherambe	Galigamuwa	22 November 2002	The 2 drip ledged caves	
Pethangoda Uyana			Pethangoda	Ruwanwella	22 July 2011	The two clusters of thorny bamboo	
Podape Purana Vihara		Podape		Aranayaka	8 July 2005	Tempita Vihara and stupa	
Pothgulgala Forest Hermitage			Kande	Galigamuwa	22 November 2002	Drip ledged caves	
Ruwanawella Bridge		Ruwanawella	Ruwanawella	Ruwanwella	6 February 2009		
Sadarthodaya Pirivena		Andurapotha	Andurapotha	Kegalle	22 November 2002	Image house	
Sakkrakandha ruins		Sakkrakandha	Ganthuna South	Kegalle	6 June 2008	Drip-ledged rock cave	
Salgala Forest Hermitage		Salgala		Warakapola	8 July 2005	Seven drip-ledged caves	
Selawa Purana Raja Maha Vihara		Selawa		Aranayaka	8 July 2005	Cave temple with paintings, sculptures and inscription	
Selawa Purana Raja Maha Vihara			Selawa West	Aranayaka	24 July 2009	Rock inscription on the rock in the vicinity	
Siddha Pattini Devalaya, Medagoda		Medagoda, Amitirigala		Ruwanwella	8 July 2005		
Sidda Pattini Devalaya, Randiligama			Randiligama	Aranayaka	6 June 2008	Tampita building	
Sitawaka fort			Pahala Maniyangama	Dehiovita	22 July 2011	The Dutch Fort situated in the Maniyangama Seetawaka Palace premises	
Siyambalapitiya Purana Vihara		Siyambalapitiya		Galigamuwa	16 February 1968	Yatahalena cave, Buddhist shrine, caves with inscriptions	
Siyambaraahena Niloluwa Adidhunu Palama			Siyambaraahena	Kegalle	13 February 2009	The bridge	
Sonagiri Gallen Tapowana Vihara			Galpata	Warakapola	24 July 2009	The drip-ledged cave with the cave inscription	
Sri Danthapaya Raja Maha Vihara		Ambulugala	Ambulugala	Mawanella	9 September 2011	The two Storied Tampita Image house	
Sri Guharama Purana Vihara		Hungampola	No. 56-C Hungampola	Kegalle	6 June 2008	The ruin mound in the place called Gurullawala Pansalwatta, and the drip ledged rock cave, cave vihara	
Sri Jinendrarama Purana Vihara		Anhettigama	Anhettigama	Deraniyagala	23 January 2009	The Buddha shrine and Vishnu Dewale	
Sri Mahaboodhi Piriven Vihara		Angwaragama	Mawela	Mawanella	23 February 2007	Vihara with paintings and sculptures in the premises	
Sri Saranathilakarama Vihara			Randiwela	Mawanella	6 June 2008	Buddhist shrine, Dhamma discourse hall, pillar holes and sacred foot print	
Sri Seneviratne Uposatha Raja Maha Vihara		Lewke Dodantale		Mawanella	10 November 1978		
Sri Shyla Vivekaramaya alias Pansalwatta		Wetenna	Udagaladeniya	Rambukkana	24 July 2009	The drip-ledged cave with the cave inscription, other drip ledged caves and flight of steps carved on the rock	
Sri Sudharmarama Tempita Vihara		Muwapitiya		Rambukkana	1 November 1996	Image house with old paintings	
Sri Sudassanarama Vihara		Arambegama	Pitiyegama	Rambukkana	22 November 2002	Tempita Vihara	
Sri Sunandarama Vihara		Ambalakanda		Aranayaka	8 July 2005	Preaching hall	
Sri Sunandarama Vihara		Udawatta	No. 19C Uthuwankanda	Mawanella	30 December 2011	Drip-ledged cave	
Streepura Gallen Vihara		Holombuwa		Galigamuwa	8 July 2005		
Tharanagala ruins		Madeiyawa		Kegalle	8 July 2005	Tharanagala rock surface	
The buildings bearing Assessment Nos. 52, 1/52, 2/52, 1/52A, 38/ 1/1 belonging to the Courts Complex		Kegalle Town	No. 51 A, Ranwala	Kegalle	22 July 2011		
Thimbiripola Raja Lena		Thimbiripola		Dehiovita	8 July 2005	Two drip ledged caves with inscriptions	
Thimbiripola Ranpothagala		Thimbiripola		Dehiovita	8 July 2005	The rock with imprinted Buddha foot	
Tholangamuwa Purana Vihara		Mampitagama		Warakapola	8 July 2005	Preaching hall	
Thumbomaluwa Vihara		Atalugama		Dehiovita	8 July 2005	Image house	
Udanwita Raja Maha Vihara		Udanwita		Rambukkana	1 November 1996	Tempita vihara with old paintings	
Udugama Purana Raja Maha Vihara		Udugama		Rambukkana	1 November 1996	Tempita vihara	
Uduwaka Purana Gallen Raja Maha Vihara		Uduwaka	Uduwaka	Warakapola	24 July 2009	The drip-ledged cave temple (Len Vihara)	
Udyanegoda Purana Len Vihara		Dodantale		Mawanella	22 September 1978		
Udyanagoda Purana Len Vihara			No. 18	Mawanella	30 December 2011	The drip-ledged rock temple with old painting and images (Sithuwam Moorthi)	
Uthuwana ruins		Uthuwana	Uthuwankande	Mawanella	6 June 2008	The drip ledged rock cave	
Veragoda ruins			Veragoda	Galigamuwa	22 November 2002	Drip ledged cave	
Villagoda Ambalama			No. 7 A, Villagoda	Rambukkana	22 November 2002	Ambalama	
Walagamba Forest Hermitage		Atugoda wewe kanda	No. 86B Renapana	Galigamuwa	18 August 2006	Rock inscription, caves with drip ledges and inscriptions	
Walagamba Gallen Raja Maha Vihara			Veragoda	Galigamuwa	22 November 2002	The cave with dwelling house, Len vihara with image house and the drip ledged cave at south side	
Walagama Ira Handa gala			Walagama	Galigamuwa	22 November 2002		
Walagamba Raja Maha Vihara		Ganekanda	Ganekanda	Yatiyanthota	6 June 2008	The drip ledged rock cave	
Waraawala Dhunu Palama		Waraawela, Mudugamuwa	Dhoranuwa, Ampahagala	Ruwanwella	13 February 2009	The bridge called Waraawala Dhunu Palama in the border of Waraawela and Mudugamuwa village	
Wathudeni Raja Maha Vihara		Lendorumulla	No. 77 - Waddeniya	Warakapola	6 June 2008	The inscriptions and drip ledged rock cave	
Wathura Raja Maha Vihara			Wathura -A	Kegalle	6 June 2008	Seated Buddha statue, stone pillars near the main gate	
Wattarama Raja Maha Vihara		Wattarama		Galigamuwa	22 November 2002	Stupa, Buddhist shrine with paintings and sculptures	
Weragala Purana Sriwardhenarama Vihara		Weragala	Weragala	Warakapola	24 July 2009	The rock inscription the pillar bases	
Yatidola Pahala Purana Vihara		Alapaladeniya	Veragoda	Galigamuwa	22 November 2002	Len vihara with image house and stupa	
Yatimahana Banagegoda Ambalama			No. 23-C Yatimahana	Mawanella	6 June 2008		
