= Giruwa Ambalama =

- ගිරුවා අම්බලම
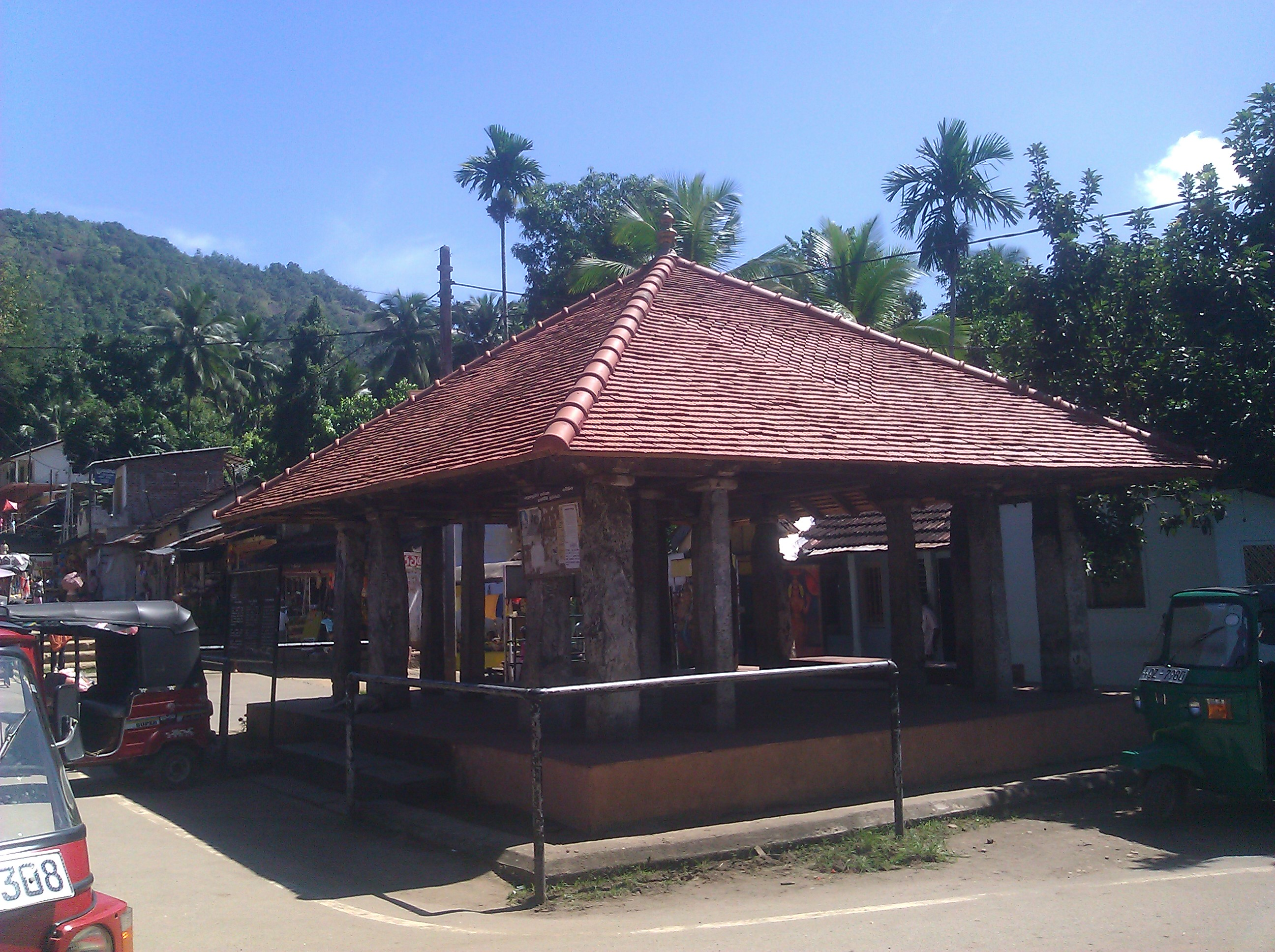
- Giruwa Ambalama at Aluth Nuwara Devala premises
- Interactive map of the Giruwa Ambalama area

General information
- Status: Preserved
- Architectural style: Ambalama
- Location: Aluthnuwara, Kegalle, Sri Lanka
- Coordinates: 07°13′36.7″N 80°29′00.2″E

Design and construction
- Designations: Archaeological protected monument

Giruwa Ambalama (Sinhala:ගිරුවා අම්බලම) is a historic wayside rest beside the Aluth Nuwara Dedimunda Devalaya site built by Queen Sunetradevi chief consort of King Parakramabahu II (A.D 1236–1276) and mother of King Bhuvanekabahu I. The pillars remaining at the site are supposed to be belonging to the period of King Bhuvanekabahu I. It has been conserved by the Archaeological department at least three times.

== See also ==
- Panavitiya Ambalama
- Appallagoda Ambalama
- Kadugannawa Ambalama
