= Rambukkana =

Rambukkana Pradeshiya Shaba රඹුක්කන ප්‍රාදේශිය සභාව ரம்புக்கனா
- Town
- Nickname: rambukkanaps
- Location within Sri Lanka
- Coordinates: 7.3135°N 80.3881°E
- Country: Sri Lanka
- Province: Sabaragamuwa Province
- District: Kegalle
- Time zone: UTC+5:30 (Sri Lanka Standard Time)
- Sri Lanka Post: 71100
- Area code: 035
- Website: rambukkana.ps.gov.lk

'Rambukkana', Pradeshiya Sabha, lies within the Kegalle district in Sabaragamuwa Province, Sri Lanka. The Council was incorporated on 7 July 1991 as Rambukkana ward and a few small towns. The constituency today has an area of 128.8 square km, with a population of 84,260.

The first President of the Council, P. T. Karunaratne, was chosen by the Cabinet.

The incline of Sri Lanka's railway Main Line starts at Rambukkana railway station, which has the second longest railway platform in the country.

== Villages ==
- Mottappuliya
- Kotawella
- Gabbala
- Weligamuwa
- Hewadiwela
- Parape
- Wahawa
- Kiriwandeniya
- Muwapitiya
- Naranbedda
- Kiriwallapitiya
- Diyasunnatha
- Kadigamuwa
- Pinnawala
- Hiriwadunna
- Hurimaluwa

== See also ==
- Rambukkana Divisional Secretariat
