= Getaberiya =

Village in Sri Lanka

Getaberiya கெடபேரிய ගෙටබේරිය
- Village
- Location in Sri Lanka
- Coordinates: 7°10′25.8″N 80°26′38.2″E
- Country: Sri Lanka
- Province: Sabaragamuwa Province
- District: Kegalle District
- Divisional Secretariats: Aranayaka
- Grama Niladhari: 47 C, Moragammana

Getaberiya (Sinhala: ගෙටබේරිය) (Tamil: கெடபேரிய) is a village in the Aranayake Division of Kegalle District of Sabaragamuwa Province in Sri Lanka.

== History ==
During the Portuguese and Dutch eras, Muslim merchants were able to develop their trade activities with South Indians with great difficulties. Ibn Batuta mentioned the kindness shown to Muslims by the country folk(Battuta 2005 :256). Probably king Senerath allowed a mosque to be built in Kandy.

Early in 1626, the Portuguese expelled the Moore from their settlements and quite a multitude fled to Kandy where Senerath offered them refuge and showed favour. Further Kandyan kings had given equal patronage to even Muslims.

The King Senerath and Rajasinha granted two lands in Gampolain 1631 and 1645 to the Muslim physician Sulttan Kuttiya who came from Galle. In addition, he was invited to Kandyan court. These ancestors were known as Galle vedarala (Dewaraja, 1994: 91). One of important copper plates is Getaberiya sannasa which was granted by King Keerthi Sri Rajasinha. In this copper plate, there was a letter z›’ or ‘Sri’ as the royal seal and the symbols of sun and moon signifying perpetuity (Bell 1892: 100). This cooper plate was granted to Gopala Mudaliya who can be identified as a Moor noble.

The Getaberiya village which inhabited by Gopala Mudaliya’s ancestors and it was situated in Tunpalata Pattuwa of Paranakuru Korale which belonged to Kegalle district. This village was presented to one of them in recognition of medical aid rendered to an old resident. The Gopala Moors of this village lived there ever since. According to H.C.P. Bell (1892) this Gopala Moors claim to belong to a race called 'MogalPatáni'. And there could be a relationship with North India. Most probably this family practiced Unani a type of treatment which is specific to Muslims(Bell 1892: 100).

They were well recognized as skillful physicians and many villagers came to them for treatments. Not only as physicians but also they had provided faithful service as aristocrats to Kandyan kings. In Rajasinghe II era this family name is mentioned in Dutch records. According to the Getaberiya sannasa the loyalty of his family caused to award a large land by the king which belonged to King’s aristocrat Moladanda earlier.
