= Asupini Ella =

Waterfall in Sri Lanka

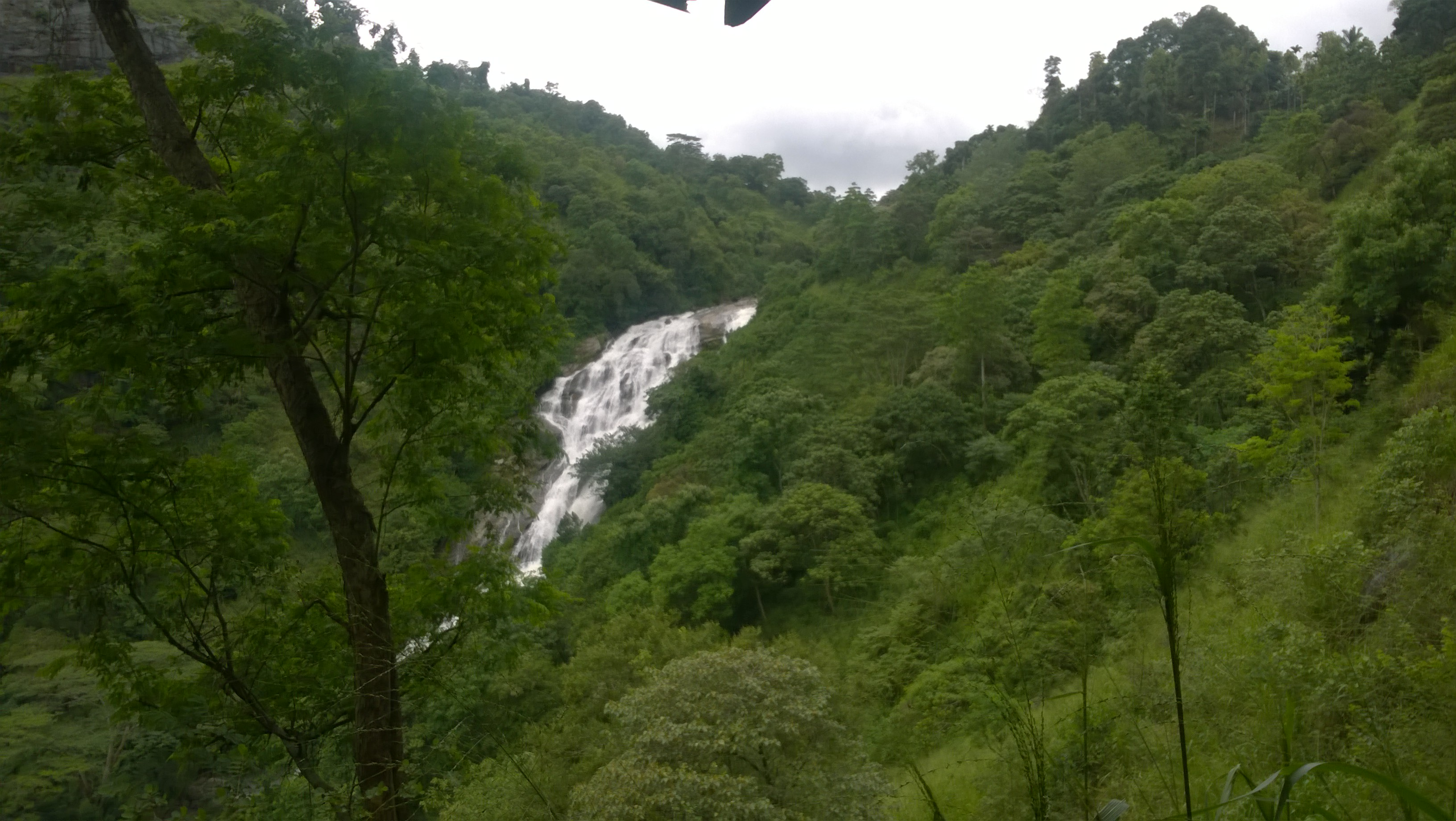
- Location: Kegalle, Mawanella, Sri Lanka
- Type: Horsetail
- Total height: 30 m (98 ft)
- Watercourse: Maha Oya

Asupini Ella, also sometimes referred to as Ahupini Ella (Sinhala: අසුපිනි ඇල්ල/අහුපිනි ඇල්ල), is a waterfall which is located at Ganga Ihala Koralaya, Rakshawa in Aranayaka, Kegalle of Sabaragamuwa Province. It's formed by Maha Oya (Ma Oya) and 134-kilometre (83 mi) long river that originates in Dolosbage in the central highlands and flows into the sea near Kochchikade. At Asupini Ella, the river descends from a height of about 100 feet (30 m). It is considered as one of the tourist destination sites in Sri Lanka.

Although Asupini Ella is regarded as a picturesque waterfall, it has gained a reputation for being dangerous. Approximately 15 deaths have been recorded in recent decades, mostly due to drowning or accidents around the falls. A rock pool at the base of the cascade, known locally as Mini Kandawala (මිනීකඳවල), is linked to popular beliefs and folklore as a site where lives have been lost.

== Legends ==
There are several legends about the name and cultural importance of the waterfall.

King Valagamba

One legend says the name comes from King Valagamba of Anuradhapura (reigned around 103 BCE). According to local legend, the king hid in the forests around Kegalle during invasions from South India. According to local stories, the king once crossed the waterfall on horseback. His horse leapt across the waterfall, so the fall was first called Asu Pani Ella (directly translates to "Horse Jump Falls"). Later, it was called Asupini Ella.

The Thirty Princesses

Another legend talks about a king who left thirty of his queens in a cave near the falls before going off to war. Locals still call the cave Tis Kumari Lena, which means "Cave of Thirty Princesses." Before leaving, the king promised to send a messenger to tell them the outcome of the battle. The messenger would carry a white flag if the king won, or a black flag if the king lost.

The king won the battle, but there are different stories about what happened after that. One version of the story says that the king told the messenger from Hathgampola to carry a black flag. Another says the messenger, who was drunk, took the wrong flag. When the queens saw the black flag from the top of the waterfall, they thought the king had been defeated. They were so sad that they jumped into the waterfall. The king was devastated when he learned about their deaths. He was so sad that he rode his horse into the waterfall and killed himself. The place where the queens' bodies are thought to have gathered is still called Mini Kandawala.

The Golden Python

Local villagers also tell a mythical story about a golden python (ran āndā) that is said to live in the pool at the bottom of the falls. According to local beliefs, pythons sometimes come out of the water and make loud noises. People think these noises mean that a human sacrifice is needed. The story isn't true, but it's still part of the waterfall's folklore.

Hidden Treasure

Another legend says that a king hid with his priest near the waterfall to escape enemies. He is said to have had a golden bed and seven golden betel cutters, which were left in a cave after his death. Some villagers think that the treasure is still hidden nearby. This legend is often attributed to King Valagamba, who is known to have sought refuge in the Aranayake area.

The surrounding region contains several ancient temples and caves linked to the stories of King Valagamba, reinforcing its place in local oral tradition.

== Etymology ==
Asupini is derived from 'Aswaya' (Horse) and 'Pini' or 'Panina' (Jump) which combined means "the horses jumped over the falls".

== See also ==
- List of waterfalls
- List of waterfalls of Sri Lanka
