= Warakapola =

Town in Kegalle District, Sri Lanka

Coordinates: 7°13′28″N 80°11′48″E

Warakapola (Sinhala: වරකාපොල; Tamil: வரகாபொல) is a town situated in the Dedigama Electorate of the Kegalle District, which is part of the Sabaragamuwa Province, Sri Lanka. Warakapola falls under the administrative unit of the Warakapola Divisional Secretariat and the local governance of the Warakapola Pradeshiya Sabha. It is located 58 km (36 mi) northeast of Colombo on the Colombo-Kandy Road.

== History ==
=== Pre-colonialism ===
Warakapola was part of Kiraweli Pattuwa, located in the Beligal Korale of the Dissava of Sabaragamuwa. This area was under the rule of the Kingdom of Kandy until it came under British colonial rule in 1815.

=== British Ceylon ===
During British Ceylon, the Kegalle District was subdivided into Paranakuru Korale, Galboda Korale, Kinigoda Korale, Beligal Korale, Atulugam Korale, Dehigampal Korale, Panawal Korale and Lower Bulatgama Korale.

Warakapola was part of Kiraweli Pattuwa, located in the Beligal Korale of the Kegalle District within the Sabaragamuwa Province. The population of Kiraweli Pattuwa, as recorded in 1871, is provided below.

The population in Beligal Korale
| | 1871 Population | Percentage |
|---|---|---|
| Gandolaha Pattuwa | 3,553 | 12.97% |
| Kandupita Pattuwa | 7,599 | 27.75% |
| Kiraweli Pattuwa | 12,187 | 44.50% |
| Otara Pattuwa | 4,047 | 14.78% |
| Beligal Korale Total | 27,386 | 100.00% |

== Demographics ==
Religious Identification in Warakapola
| | 2012 Population | Percentage |
|---|---|---|
| Buddhist | 102,661 | 90.81% |
| Islam | 6,326 | 5.60% |
| Hindu | 3,065 | 2.71% |
| Roman Catholic | 677 | 0.60% |
| Other Christian | 320 | 0.28% |
| Other | 7 | 0.01% |
| Total | 113,056 | 100.00% |

== Neighbourhood ==
- Ambagala
- Ambepussa
- Dummaladeniya
- Etnawala
- Ganithapura
- Madeniya
- Mahena
- Mainnoluwa
- Medagoda (Horagolla)
- Niwatuwa
- Pilanduwa
- Thumbiliyadda

== Tourist attractions ==
Warakapola has a number of nearby tourist attractions:

- Algama Ella, a waterfall located on the Algama-Uduwaka road.
- Dedigama Kotawehera, found adjacent to the 3rd km post on the Galapitamada road, which branches off from the Colombo-Kandy main route at Nelumdeniya junction.
- Dorawaka Rock Cave, also known as Ethubendi Lena, an archaeologically significant site situated some distance from the Warakapola-Anguruwella road.
- Dunumala Waterfall, located in the village of Uduwaka on the Algama-Galapitamada road.
- Theli Ella, a waterfall on the Gurugoda Oya, a tributary of the Kelani River, lying off the Nelundeniya-Galapitamada road, close to Dedigama.
- Muthukeliya Mountain Range, known for its natural beauty and biodiversity.
- Bandula barb (Pethia bandula) is a species of cyprinid endemic to Sri Lanka. It is found only in a small stream near Galapitamada.

== Warakapola Pradeshiya Sabha ==
Warakapola Pradeshiya Sabha established under the Pradeshiya Sabha Act No. 15 of 1987, is the largest Pradeshiya Sabha in the Kegalle District. Historically, the Dedigama area was governed by three separate local government institutions: the Warakapola Town Council, Dedigama Village Council, and Tholangamuwa Othara Pattu Village Council. These three institutions were amalgamated in 1991 to form the Warakapola Pradeshiya Sabha.

The inaugural session of the Warakapola Pradeshiya Sabha was held on 1 July 1991 at the Warakapola Town Hall. The Pradeshiya Sabha office was relocated to its current building, equipped with modern facilities, on 26 October 2020.

== Education ==
=== Technical College ===
- Technical College - Warakapola

=== Central College ===
- Babul Hassan Central College - Medagoda, Warakapola

=== Maha Vidyalaya ===
- Ambepussa Maha Vidyalaya - Ambepussa, Warakapola
- Etnnawla Maha Vidyalaya -Etnnawla, Warakapola
- Gamini Maha Vidyalaya - Dummaladeniya, Warakapola
- Mainnoluwa Maha Vidyalaya - Mainnoluwa, Warakapola

=== Vidyalaya ===
- Baudda Vidiyalaya - Pilanduwa, Warakapola
- Dummaladeniya Muslim Vidyalaya - Dummaladeniya, Warakapola
- Madeniya Tamil Vidyalaya - Madeniya, Warakapola

=== Kanishta Vidyalaya ===
- Mahena Kanishta Vidyalaya - Mahena, Warakapola

== Health Services ==
=== Public Health Services ===
==== Hospitals ====
- Ayurvedic Hospital - Warakapola
- Base Hospital - Warakapola

== See also ==
- Korale
- Warakapola Divisional Secretariat
- Dedigama Electorate
- Kegalle District
- Sabaragamuwa Province
- Sri Lanka
- List of Archaeological Protected Monuments in Kegalle District
