= Dombemada =

Dombemada දොඹේමඩ
- Village
- Location within Sri Lanka
- Coordinates: 7.3841°N 80.3512°E
- Country: Sri Lanka
- Province: Sabaragamuwa Province
- District: Kegalle
- Town: Rambukkana Divisional Secretariat
- Time zone: UTC+5:30 (Sri Lanka Standard Time)
- Sri Lanka Post: 71100
- Area code: 035

Dombemada is a village in Rambukkana Divisional Secretariat in Kegalle district, Sabaragamuwa province, Sri Lanka.

There is a sub post office of Sri Lanka national postal service in the village. The postal code of Dombemada is 71115.

Dombemada Kanishta Vidyalaya is the only government school of that village which belongs to Rambukkana division of Mawanella education zone.
