= Gevilipitiya Town Grama Niladhari Division =

Gevilipitiya Town
- Grama Niladhari Division
- Interactive map of Gevilipitiya Town
- Coordinates: 7.182366°N 80.453036°E
- Country: Sri Lanka
- Province: Sabaragamuwa Province
- District: Kegalle District
- Divisional Secretariat: Aranayaka Divisional Secretariat
- Electoral District: Kegalle Electoral District
- Polling Division: Aranayaka Polling Division

Area
  - Total: 0.65 km^{2} (0.25 sq mi)
- Elevation: 250 m (820 ft)

Population (2012)
  - Total: 1,377
  - Density: 2,118/km^{2} (5,490/sq mi)
- ISO 3166 code: LK-9209130

Gevilipitiya Town

Gevilipitiya Town Grama Niladhari Division is a Grama Niladhari Division of the Aranayaka Divisional Secretariat of Kegalle District of Sabaragamuwa Province, Sri Lanka . It has Grama Niladhari Division Code 45B.

Gevilipitiya Town is a surrounded by the Dippitiya, Gevilipitiya Gama, Moragammana, Narangammana and Vilpola Grama Niladhari Divisions.

== Demographics ==
=== Ethnicity ===
The Gevilipitiya Town Grama Niladhari Division has a Sinhalese majority (94.2%) . In comparison, the Aranayaka Divisional Secretariat (which contains the Gevilipitiya Town Grama Niladhari Division) has a Sinhalese majority (90.1%)

Ethnicity in Gevilipitiya Town
1. Sinhalese (94.2%)
2. Moor (5.20%)
3. Other (0.70%)

=== Religion ===
The Gevilipitiya Town Grama Niladhari Division has a Buddhist majority (94.2%) . In comparison, the Aranayaka Divisional Secretariat (which contains the Gevilipitiya Town Grama Niladhari Division) has a Buddhist majority (90.0%)

Religion in Gevilipitiya Town
1. Buddhist (94.2%)
2. Muslim (5.60%)
3. Other (0.20%)
