= Beligammana Raja Maha Vihara =

- බෙලිගම්මන රජ මහා විහාරය
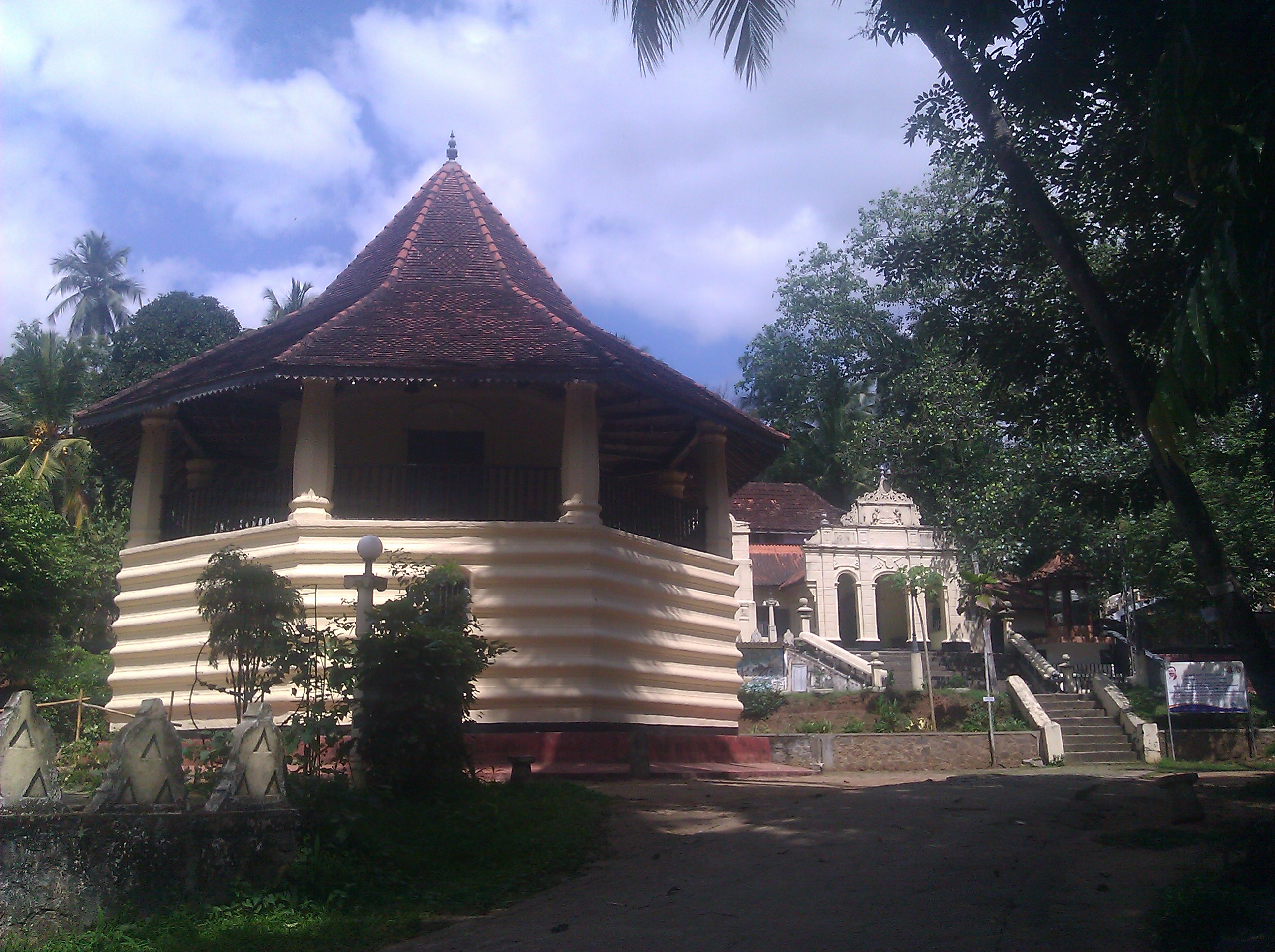

Religion
- Affiliation: Buddhism
- District: Kegalle
- Province: Sabaragamuwa Province

Location
- Location: Mawanella, Sri Lanka
- Interactive map of Beligammana Raja Maha Vihara
- Coordinates: 07°15′00.5″N 80°27′16.2″E

Architecture
- Type: Buddhist Temple
- Completed: 1820

Beligammana Raja Maha Vihara (also known as Beligammana Pothgul Vihara) is a Buddhist temple situated in Mawanella, Kegalle District, Sri Lanka. It is lies on the Colombo – Kandy main road, approximately 1 km (0.62 mi) away from the Mawanella town.

Constructed in the early part of the 19th century, this temple is presently declared as an archaeological protected monument by the Department of Archaeology. The designation was declared on 7 December 2001 under the government Gazette number 1214.

== See also ==
- Utuwankande Sura Saradiel
