= Aranayaka =

Aranayaka අරණායක
- Town
- Location in Sri Lanka
- Coordinates: 7°8′51.5″N 80°27′16.76″E
- Country: Sri Lanka
- Province: Sabaragamuwa Province
- District: Kegalle District
- Time zone: UTC+05:30 (SLST)
- Postal code: 71540
- Area code: 035

Aranayaka (Sinhala: අරණායක) is a town in the Kegalle District of Sabaragamuwa Province in Sri Lanka. Its agricultural economy revolves around local rubber, tea, banana and mahogany plantations. The town got popular due to a tragic landslide triggered on 17 May 2016.

The Mawanella-Aranayaka-Horawella Road (Highway B278) passes through the middle of the city, running parallel to the Maha Oya on the east side. Dippitiya, a town situated 3 km (1.9 mi) north of Aranayaka, has a greater population but fewer amenities. The local police station is situated in the town of Gevilipitiya, 4.3 km (2.7 mi) north of Aranayaka.

== See also ==
- 2016 Aranayake landslide
- Aranayaka Divisional Secretariat
- Maha Oya Pumped Storage Power Station
