= 2021 Sri Lanka floods =

Floods occurred in Sri Lanka during May and June 2021

- Location: Sabaragamuwa Province Central Province Southern Province Western Province
- Deaths: 3 (May 2021); 17 (June 2021)
- Property damage: over 800 houses fully damaged (June 2021)

The 2021 floods and landslides in Sri Lanka are flash floods and mudslides which were caused from heavy torrential rainfalls during May and June 2021. As of 7 June 2021; the monsoon floods affected in about 10 districts, killing at least 17 persons including about 10 because of floods and 4 people because of mudslides. About 245,000 people were affected living in Colombo, Puttalam, Kandy, Kalutara, Kurunegala, Gampaha, Nuwara Eliya, Ratnapura and Galle. More than 800 houses were reported to have been damaged.

== Background ==
Flooding occurs in Sri Lanka on a regular basis during May and June as tropical cyclones and the southwest monsoon impact the nation.

The flood situation took a toll on the livelihoods of Sri Lankan people who were also crippled by the impact of COVID-19 pandemic with cases continuing to surge in the months of May and June.

== Floods ==
=== May 2021 ===
Sri Lanka experienced flash floods and torrential rain fall in the month of May due to Cyclone Yaas which originated in the Bay of Bengal. According to Sri Lanka's Disaster Management Centre, the floods in the month of May killed at least 4 people and about 42000 people were affected. It was reported that around 200 houses were either fully or partially damaged by the floods in May 2021.

=== June 2021 ===
The month of June also witnessed unprecedented amount of rainfall in about ten districts triggered by the onset of southwest monsoon. Many houses, paddy fields and roads were inundated by the flash floods. As of 3 June 2021, it was reported that six people were killed during the floods and five people were reported to be missing. However, the death toll rose to 14 as of 6 June 2021. On the next day as of 7 June 2021, the death toll jumped to 17 with 3 more deaths being reported.

An average rainfall of around 125 mm has reportedly fallen in upper catchment areas of the Kelani River on 5 June 2021 which prompted authorities to issue a red alert regarding a flood. The water levels of Maha Oya also rose significantly after a rainfall exceeding 100mm was reportedly fallen in upper catchment areas of the Maha Oya. About thousands of people have been left homeless.

The Sri Lanka Navy deployed 33 teams to the areas adversely affected by the floods. The Sri Lanka Air Force has also come into rescue operations and has been closely monitoring the situation.
