= Mangalagama =

- Village
- Country: Sri Lanka
- Province: Sabaragamuwa Province
- District: Kegalle District
- Time zone: UTC+5:30 (Sri Lanka Standard Time)

Mangalagama is an ancient village in Sri Lanka. It is located within the Rambukkana Division in the Kegalle District in Sabaragamuwa Province, Sri Lanka. Managlagama is situated by the Colombo - Kandy main road, 87 km away from Colombo / 28 km away from Kandy. The nearest towns are: Kegalla (6 km) and Mawanella (4 km). The post office that covers Managlagama is: Molagoda (2 km).

Mangalagama is known for its 'Ambalama' (travellers' rest) which was built during the Kandyan period and renovated in the 1970s. Proclaimed as an archeological site by the Department of Archeology, it is located at the village centre, on the left when proceeds towards Kandy.

About 100 meters interior from Ambalama is the picturesque Buddhist temple 'Sri Bodhimaalakaaramaya' of the village, at the foot of a majestic 200 feet-high granite-rock. On top of the rock, overlooking the main road, is a large white statue of seated Buddha. The temple, with over 300-year old sacred Bo tree, a rock inscription and a shrine room on rock pillars, was said to have built during the time of Kandyan kings. The temple accommodates 50 monks and possesses an education institute (known as 'pirivena')that conducts sessions daily in afternoons for young Buddhist monks.

The only government institution in Mangalagama is the Primary School, with about 100 students in classes up to Grade 6. The village is covered with rice (paddy) and rubber cultivation. The population is about 400, consisted of 80 families.

== See also ==
- Sabaragamuwa Province, Sri Lanka
