= Bandula barb =

Conservation status
- Critically Endangered (IUCN 3.1)

Scientific classification
- Kingdom: Animalia
- Phylum: Chordata
- Class: Actinopterygii
- Order: Cypriniformes
- Family: Cyprinidae
- Genus: Pethia
- Species: P. bandula

Binomial name
- Pethia bandula (Kottelat & Pethiyagoda, 1991)

Synonyms
- Puntius bandula Kottelat & Pethiyagoda, 1991

Species of fish

Pethia bandula, commonly known as bandula barb, is a species of cyprinid endemic to Sri Lanka where it is only known from near Galapitamada in the Warakapola Divisional Secretariat. As this critically endangered species only was known from a single unprotected site where the population consists of an estimated 1,000 individuals, a second "insurance population" was established in 2014 by a team of IUCN scientists in cooperation with Sri Lanka's Forest Department, the Department of Wildlife Conservation and local communities.
