= Ruwanwella Divisional Secretariat =

- Divisional Secretariat
- Interactive map of Ruwanwella Divisional Secretariat
- Country: Sri Lanka
- Province: Sabaragamuwa Province
- District: Kegalle District
- Time zone: UTC+5:30 (Sri Lanka Standard Time)

Ruwanwella Divisional Secretariat is a Divisional Secretariat of Kegalle District, of Sabaragamuwa Province, Sri Lanka.

== Demography ==
Religion in Ruwanwella DS Division (2012)
1. Buddhist (86.4%)
2. Hindu (6.20%)
3. Muslim (6.00%)
4. Roman Catholic (0.90%)
5. Other Christian (0.60%)
6. Other (0.00%)
