= Galigamuwa Divisional Secretariat =

- Divisional Secretariat
- Country: Sri Lanka
- Province: Sabaragamuwa Province
- District: Kegalle District
- Time zone: UTC+5:30 (Sri Lanka Standard Time)

Galigamuwa Divisional Secretariat is a Divisional Secretariat of Kegalle District, of Sabaragamuwa Province, Sri Lanka.

== Demography-Religion ==
Religion in Galigamuwa DS Division (2012)
1. Buddhist (94.0%)
2. Hindu (3.30%)
3. Muslim (1.60%)
4. Roman Catholic (0.70%)
5. Other Christian (0.40%)
6. Other (0.00%)
