= Naranbedda =

Naranbedda නාරන්බැද්ද
- Location in Sri Lanka
- Coordinates: 7.31612°N 80.36194°E
- Country: Sri Lanka
- Province: Sabaragamuwa Province
- District: Kegalle District
- Time zone: +5.30

Naranbedda (Sinhala: නාරන්බැද්ද) is a village in Kegalle District, Sabaragamuwa Province of Sri Lanka.
