= Yatiyanthota Divisional Secretariat =

- Divisional Secretariat
- Interactive map of Yatiyanthota Divisional Secretariat
- Country: Sri Lanka
- Province: Sabaragamuwa Province
- District: Kegalle District
- Time zone: UTC+5:30 (Sri Lanka Standard Time)

Yatiyanthota Divisional Secretariat is a Divisional Secretariat of Kegalle District, of Sabaragamuwa Province, Sri Lanka.

== Demography ==
Religion in Yatiyanthota DS Division (2012)
1. Buddhist (73.1%)
2. Hindu (19.8%)
3. Muslim (4.60%)
4. Roman Catholic (1.30%)
5. Other Christian (1.20%)
6. Other (0.00%)
