= Dehiovita Divisional Secretariat =

- Divisional Secretariat
- Country: Sri Lanka
- Province: Sabaragamuwa Province
- District: Kegalle District

Population
  - Total: 81,315
- Time zone: UTC+5:30 (Sri Lanka Standard Time)

Dehiovita Divisional Secretariat is a Divisional Secretariat of Kegalle District, of Sabaragamuwa Province, Sri Lanka.

== Demography ==
Religion in Dehiovita DS Division (2012)
1. Buddhist (79.2%)
2. Hindu (13.4%)
3. Muslim (4.40%)
4. Roman Catholic (2.20%)
5. Other Christian (0.80%)
6. Other (0.00%)
