= Kadugannawa Ambalama =

Resting building west of Kadugannawa, Sri Lanka

- කඩුගන්නාව අම්බලම
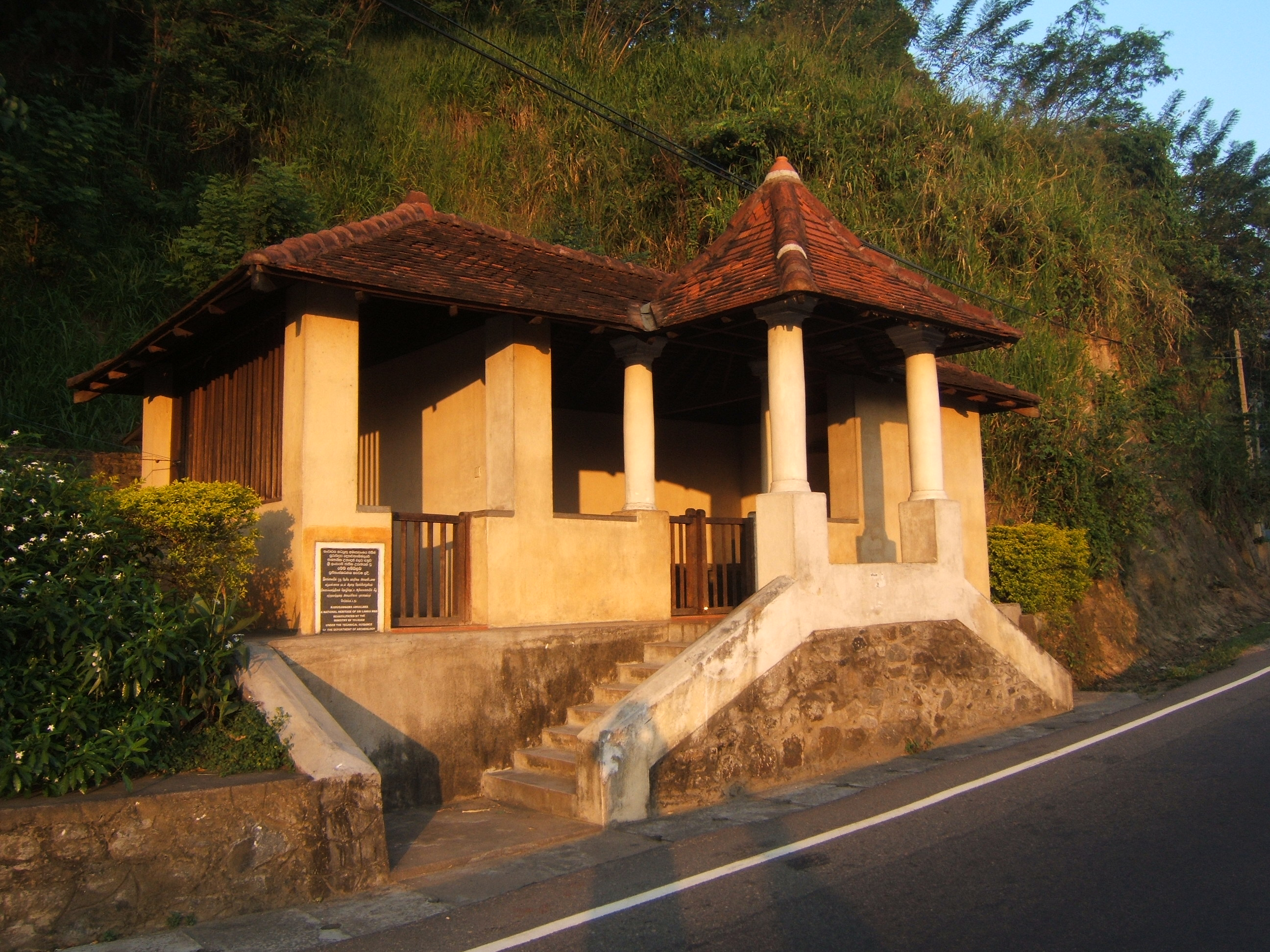
- Kadugannawa Ambalama
- Interactive map of the Kadugannawa Ambalama area

General information
- Status: Preserved
- Architectural style: Ambalama
- Location: Pahala Kadugannawa, Mawanella, Sri Lanka
- Coordinates: 7°15′10.5″N 80°29′50.5″E

Design and construction
- Designations: Archaeological protected monument

Kadugannawa Ambalama (Sinhala:කඩුගන්නාව අම්බලම) is a historic ambalama that is found on the left, when traveling from Colombo to Kandy, a few metres before the Kadugannawa hairpin turn at Kadugannawa pass. Built in the early 19th century during the British colonial rule in Ceylon (now Sri Lanka), the Ambalama is now more than 200 years old. A popular stopover for horsemen and merchants traveling from the lowlands to the ancient hill capital Kandy, this structure resembles the Kandyan-era architecture and is of archaeological value. It was renovated by the Ministry of Tourism under the technical guidance of the Department of Archaeology at a cost of Rs. 300,000, and is now considered a national heritage item of Sri Lanka.
