= Kegalle Divisional Secretariat =

- Divisional Secretariat
- Interactive map of Kegalle Divisional Secretariat
- Country: Sri Lanka
- Province: Sabaragamuwa Province
- District: Kegalle District
- Time zone: UTC+5:30 (Sri Lanka Standard Time)

Kegalle Divisional Secretariat is a Divisional Secretariat of Kegalle District, of Sabaragamuwa Province, Sri Lanka.

== Demography ==
Religion in Kegalle DS Division (2012)
1. Buddhist (94.0%)
2. Hindu (2.20%)
3. Muslim (1.40%)
4. Roman Catholic (1.70%)
5. Other Christian (0.70%)
6. Other (0.00%)
