= Ruwanawella Bridge =

- Coordinates: 7.0463952°N 80.2522984°E
- Carries: 2 lanes
- Crosses: Gurugoda Oya
- Locale: Ruwanwella

Characteristics
- Design: Arch bridge
- Material: Steel
- Total length: 43.8 m (144 ft)
- Width: 3.6 m (12 ft)
- No. of spans: 1

History
- Construction end: 1944; 82 years ago

Location
- Interactive map of Ruwanawella Bridge

Ruwanawella Bridge is an iron arch bridge built over the Gurugoda Oya, a tributary of the Kelani River, in Ruwanwella during the British colonial era. The upper part of the bridge is 43.8 metres (144 ft) long and 3.6 metres (12 ft) wide and is the shape of an arch. A new bridge is under construction in place of this bridge.

The bridge was formally recognised by the Government as a protected archaeological monument on 6 February 2009.

On 27 May 2011 Sri Lanka Post issued a Rs.15 stamp with a photograph of the bridge, as part of a set of stamps commemorating bridges and culverts in Sri Lanka.

== See also ==
- Nine Arch Bridge, Demodara
- Mawanella Bridge
