= Bulathkohupitiya Divisional Secretariat =

- Divisional Secretariat
- Location within Sri Lanka
- Coordinates: 7.10551°N 80.3372°E
- Country: Sri Lanka
- Province: Sabaragamuwa Province
- District: Kegalle District
- Time zone: UTC+5:30 (SLST)
- Area code: 035

Bulathkohupitiya Divisional Secretariat is a Divisional Secretariat of Kegalle District, of Sabaragamuwa Province, Sri Lanka.

== Demography ==
Religion in Bulathkohupitiya DS Division (2012)
1. Buddhist (82.0%)
2. Hindu (16.2%)
3. Muslim (0.40%)
4. Roman Catholic (0.80%)
5. Other Christian (0.60%)
6. Other (0.00%)

== See also ==
- List of Divisional Secretariats of Sabaragamuwa Province
