= Warakapola Divisional Secretariat =

Warakapola Divisional Secretariat වරකාපොල ප්‍රාදේශීය ලේකම් කාර්‍යාලය
- Divisional Secretariat
- Location within Sri Lanka
- Coordinates: 7.2268°N 80.1959°E
- Country: Sri Lanka
- Province: Sabaragamuwa Province
- District: Kegalle District

Area
  - Total: 199 km^{2} (77 sq mi)
- Elevation: 83 m (272 ft)

Population
  - Total: 113,896
  - Density: 561/km^{2} (1,450/sq mi)
- Time zone: UTC+5:30 (SLST)
- Postal code: 71600
- Area code: 035
- Website: Warakapola Divisional Secretariat

Warakapola Divisional Secretariat is a Divisional Secretariat of Kegalle District, of Sabaragamuwa Province, Sri Lanka.And it consist of 78 Grama Niladhari divisions.

== Demography ==
Religion in Warakapola DS Division (2012)
1. Buddhist (90.8%)
2. Hindu (2.70%)
3. Muslim (5.60%)
4. Roman Catholic (0.60%)
5. Other Christian (0.30%)
6. Other (0.00%)

== History ==
The Chief Headman Division of Beligal Korale was restructured in 1941 as the Beligal Korale Revenue Office, in accordance with the Headman (Change of Designation) Ordinance No. 11 of 1941. Later, the Beligal Korale Revenue Office was divided into two: Warakapola Revenue Office (West) and Galigamuwa Revenue Office (East), effective from 1 June 1971. The Warakapola Revenue Office (West) was subsequently designated as the Warakapola Divisional Secretariat under the Divisional Secretariats Act, No. 58 of 1992, effective from 1 January 1993.

== Grama Niladhari Divisions ==
NO	GN DIVISION NO	GN DIVISION	GN NAME	GN OFFICE ADDRESS
1	77	WADDENIYA	MrS K S CHANDRAKANTHI	GN OFFICE, WEDDENIYA, HELAMADA
2	77A	WENIWELLAKADUWA	Mr W A N RANATHUNGA	WENIWELLKADUWA WASAMA, ALAUWA
3	77B	KODAPALUWA	Mr S.R.M.W. RAJAWARDANA	KODAPALUWA, ALAUWA
4	78	RAGALKANDA	Mr N. L. S. N. NARANGODA	GN OFFICE, RAGALKANDA, ALAUWA
5	78A	HELIYAGODA	MrS P.D.A.MADUSHANI	HELIYAGODA, BELIGALA
6	78B	OPATHA	Mr H.S.S.K.SENADEERA	78A OPATHA WASAMA, ALAUWA
7	78C	PASPOLAKANDA	Mrs K H K HANDAGAMA	GN OFFICE, PASPOLAKANDA, ALAUWA
8	79	EGALLA	Mr W A P WEERASOORIYA	NO 79.EGALLA, BELIGALA
9	79A	KALUGALA	Mr H.A.RATHNAWARDANA	GN OFFICE, KALUGALA WASAMA, BELIGALA
10	79B	THALGAMA	MrS B.C.L.VIPULASENA	79B THALGAMA WASAMA, THALGAMA,
				BELIGALA
11	79C	METIYAGANE	MISS K.A.K.N.R.JAYASINGHE	GN OFFICE, METIYAGANE, BELIGALA
12	80	MORAWAKA	Mr M.A. ABERATHNE	NO 80, MORAWAKA, NELUNDENIYA
13	80A	MAMPITA	MRS P.R.W.DISSANAYAKA	GN OFFICE,80A, MAMPITA WASAMA,
				NELUNDENIYA
14	81	AKWATTA	Mr N.L.S.N. NARANGODA (ACT)	NO 81, AKWATTA WASAMA,
				KAHABILIYAWALA, ALAUWA
15	81A	KUMBALGAMA	MR B L.D.NISANTHA	KUMBALGAMA, BELIGALA
16	81B	PINNAGODAKANDA	MrS A.D.K.DILRUKSHI	81B, PINNAGODAKANDA WASAMA,
				NELUNDENIYA
17	82	MANGEDARA	Mr H.M.P.WEERASOORIYA	MANGEDARA, WARAKAPOLA
18	82A	TULHIRIYA	Mr G.H.J.RATHNAKUMARA	82A, THULHIRIYA
19	82B	GASNAWA	Mrs P.M.THAMARA KUMARI	GN OFFICE,82B, GASNAWA WASAMA,
				THOLANGAMUWA
20	82C	NANGALLA	Mrs I L G PRIYADHARSHANEE	NO 82C, NANGALLA
21	82D	PARACKRAMAGAMA	Mr A.H.R.AHANGAMA	GN OFFICE,82D, PARACKRAMAGAMA WASAMA, THULHIRIYA
22	83	THOLANGAMUWA	Mr T M M S DHARMASIRI	GN OFFICE, PRIME LAND,
				THOLANGAMUWA
23	83A	AMBEPUSSA	Mr P.D.SEENADEERA	GN OFFICE, AMBEPUSSA, WARAKAPOLA
24	83B	MAHENA	Mr K.M.KULARATHNA	NO 83B, KOLANGAMUWA WASAMA
25	83C	MAHENA COLONI	MRS A.A.S.ATHUKORALA	GN OFFICE, MAHENA cOLONI,
				WARAKAPOLA
26	83D	DELGAMUWA	Mr M I M HASMI	GN OFFICE, DELGAMUWA, THOLANGAMUWA
27	83E	ELIPANGAMUWA	Mr A WEERASINGHE	ELIPANGAMUWA WASAMA, THOLANGAMUWA
28	84	BURUNNAWA	MrS B.M.S JEEWANI	BURUNNAWA, THOLANGAMUWA
29	84A	OTHNAPITIYA	Mrs K M C L GUNARATHNA	NO 84A, OTHNAPITIYA WASAMA
30	84B	NAPE	MrS W.M.C.S.BANDARA	NAPE NELUMDENIYA
31	85	DEDIGAMA	Mr K.H.T.S.ARIYASENA	GN OFFICE, NO 85 DEDIGAMA, NELUMDENIYA
32	85A	THUNTHOTA	MR K.H.T.S.ARIYASENA (ACT)	85A, THUNTHOTA WASAMA, THUNTHOTA
33	85B	NELUNDENIYA	Ms G M GANGANI	85B, NELUMDENIYA WASAMA, NELUMDENIYA
34	85C	PITADENIYA	Mr R M S PREMACHANDRA	GN OFFICE, PITADENIYA WASAMA,
				NELUMDENIYA
35	85D	IMBULOWITA	Mr P M G SENAWIRATHNA (A)	85D, IMBULOWITA WASAMA, THUNTHOTA
36	86	MENIKKADAWARA	Mr B.S.P.C.W.BANDARA	86 MENIKKADAWARA, THUNTHOTA
37	86A	IHALA LENAGALA	MrS R.M.N.P.K.RATHNAYAKA	GN OFFICE, IHALA LENAGALA, THUNTHOTA
38	87	MAHAPALLEGAMA	Mr D.P.NAWARATHNA	MAHAPALLEGAMA, PALLEGAMA
39	87A	THAMBADIYA	Mrs K MALLIKA (A)	87A, THAMBADIYA WASAMA, DIPPITIYA,
				MAHAPALLEGAMA
40	87B	KUDA PALLEGAMA	MS B.N.M.A.BALASOORIYA	87B, KUDAPALLEGAMA, MAHA PALLEGAMA
41	87C	KINIWITA	Mr M A ABEYRATHNA	KINIWITA, MAHA PALLEGAMA
42	88	MALMADUWA	Mr J.A.C.N.LEELARATHNA	88 MALMADUWA, MALMADUWA
43	88A	POLGAMPOLA	Mr P R U. JAYARATHNA	POLGAMPOLA, KOTIYAKUMBURA
44	88B	ELAMALDENIYA	Mr N.D.S.K.JAYASINGHA	ELAMALDENIYA WASAMA, MALMADUWA
45	88C	PALLE PELPITA	Mrs M.W.G.D.KUMARI	PALLE PELPITA, NO 88C, KOTIYAKUMBURA
46	89	ALPITIYA	Mr L PIYARATHNA	89 ELPITIYA, GALAPITAMADA
47	89A	WELHELLA	MrS G.R.K.G.BANDARA	89A, WELHELLA, GALAPITAMADA
48	89B	KIWULDENIYA	Mr S.B.U.S.PATHIRANA (ACT)	GN OFFICE, NO 89B, KIUWLDENIYA,
				GALAPITAMADA
49	90	WERAGALA	Mr S B U S PATHIRANA	NO 90, WERAGALA WASAMA, WERAGALA,
				WARAKAPOLA
50	90A	PAHALA LENAGALA	Mr K P J BANDARA	PAHALA LENAGALA, WERAGALA
51	91	DORAWAKA UDABAGE	MrS W.R.I.SAMARASINGHE	NO 91, UDABAGE WASAMA, DORAWAKA
52	91A	KOHOMBADENIYA	Mr M.H.MOHOMED	91A, KOHOBADENIYA, DORAWAKA
53	91B	DORAWAKA PALLEBAGE	Mrs R.M.C.L. KARUNARATHNE	NO 91B, DORAWAKA PALLEBAGE
54	91C	THALLIYADDA	Mrs K W M K WICKRAMANAYAKE	GN OFFICE,91C, THALLIYADDA, DORAWAKA
55	91D	YADDEHIMULLA	MR R.A.L.SENEVIRATHNE (ACT)	NO 91D, YADDEHIMULLA, DORAWAKA
56	92	KUKULPANE	Mrs L V K HARISCHANDRA	NO 92, KUKULPANE, DORAWAKA
57	92A	WARAKAPOLA	Mr H T GUNAWARDHANA	GN OFFICE,1st LANE, WARAKAPOLA
58	92B	GANITHAPURA	Mr D.M.RATHNASIRI	92B, GANITHAPURA WASAMA, GANITHAPURA, WARAKAPOLA
59	92C	THUMBALIYADDA	Mr R.A.L.SENEVIRATHNE	NO 92C, THUBALIYADDA WASAMA,
				WARAKAPOLA
60	93	WERAGODA	Mr M S K RAJAPAKSHA	NO 93, WERAGODA WASAMA, NIYADURUPOLA
61	93A	HALLAWA	Mr J.A.M.P.JAYAKODY	NO 93A, HALLAWA, GALAPITAMADA
62	93B	PALAMURE	Mr P .R.A.S.BANDARA	NO 93B, PALAMURE WASAMA, NIYADURUPOLA
63	93C	EBIDIGALA	Mrs S A M N K JAYARATHNA	93C, EBIDIGALA, GALAPITAMADA
64	93D	HAPUGODA	Mrs P.M.G.SENEVIRATHNE	GN OFFICE, HAPUGODA, MINIPURA,
				MAHAPALLEGAMA
65	94	BOPITIYA	Mr S N S D IHALAWATTA	GN OFFICE, NO 94, BOPITIYA, WARAKAPOLA
66	94A	ETHNAWALA	Mr W.A.N.P.WEERAKKODI	94A, ETHNAWALA, WARAKAPOLA
67	94B	NIWATUWA	Mr G A WEERASOORIYA	94B, NIWATUWA
68	94C	DUMMALADENIYA	Mr P KARUNATHILAKE	DUMMALDENIYA, WARAKAPOLA
69	95	ALGAMA	MRS M.T.S.D.MENIKE	GN OFFICE,95 ALGAMA, MEDAGAMA, ALGAMA
70	95A	MADURUPITIYA	Ms R.M.K.N.RAJAPAKSHA	95A, MADURUPITIYA, ALGAMA
71	95B	THALGAHADENIYA	Mrs A S K JAYARATHNA (A)	GN OFFICE, GRAMA NILADHARI,
				THALGAHADENIYA
72	95C	KANDEGAMA	Mr A WITHANAGE	KANDEGAMA, ALGAMA
73	95D	ALGAMA IHALAGAMA	Mrs E.G.C.P.JAYAWARDANA	GN OFFICE,95D, ALGAMA IHALAGAMA,
				ALGAMA
74	96	GODAWELA	Mr A.L.C.J.LIYANAGE	96, GODAWELA, DANOWITA
75	96A	THAMBUGALA	Mr B A K BALASOORIYA	THAMBUGALA, DANOWITA
76	96B	PUHULEGAMA	Mrs M D A K MINITHANTRI	96B, PUHULEGAMA, DANOWITA
77	96C	PENIHELA	Mr A L C J LIYANAGE (A)	PENAHELA, WEWALDENIYA
78	97	UDUWAKA	Mrs N.D.T.P.JAYARATHNE	GN OFFICE, UDUWAKA SABARAGAMUWA, ALGAMA

== Tourist Attractions ==
=== Algama Ella ===
This gorgeous nature reserve spans a few kilometers long flowing along rock pools and numerous small waterfalls.

Located on the Algama-Uduwaka road in the Kegalle district of the Sabaragamuwa Province of Sri Lanka this is highly popular among local tourists and is crowded on weekends and public holidays. For photography, weekdays are more suitable when crowds are less.

=== Dedigama Kotawehera ===
The historical terrain is situated in Dedigama village in Warakapola Divisional Secretariat. The thupa is located adjacent to 3rd km post in Galapitamada road which runs from Nelumdeniya junction deviating from Colombo-Kandy main route.

Villagers call the place as “Weherawaththa”. The tope is the very reason behind its fame. As the chronicle mentions Dedigama Kotawehera alias Soothighara Stupa was erected at the birth place of a great King in Sri Lankan history; King Maha Parakramabahu (1153-1186 A.D.).

=== Dorawaka Rock Cave - Ethubendi Lena ===
Is an archaeologically valuable site which was located too far from the main road.There is no vehicle path, but you can drive to the place by motorbike. Its very difficult to access here, because there is no road. Only foot steps in here.you have to go through rubber state. No shops or any other places near the cave.

=== Dunumala Waterfall ===
This beautiful waterfall which is medium in height (around 25 feet) is situated in the village of Uduwaka on the Algama-Galapitamada road in the Kegalle district of the Sabaragamuwa Province of Sri Lanka.

=== Theli Ella ===
It's a beautiful place to visit. But be careful. DO NOT GET TO THE WATER. There are so many underground water tunnels, water currents and pits abouts 30 ft deep.

Theli Ella is a waterfall created by the Gurugoda Oya lying off the Nelundeniya – Galapitamada close to the Dedigama. Access to this 12m waterfall is difficult and lies far away from any road. Folklore states that King Walagamba was hiding a close waterfall during his exile and one of his queens lost her necklace at the falls giving it the name “Theli Ella

== See also ==
- Korale
- Warakapola
- Dedigama Electorate
- Kegalle District
- Sabaragamuwa Province
- Sri Lanka
- List of Archaeological Protected Monuments in Kegalle District
