= Deraniyagala Divisional Secretariat =

- Divisional Secretariat
- Country: Sri Lanka
- Province: Sabaragamuwa Province
- District: Kegalle District
- Time zone: UTC+5:30 (Sri Lanka Standard Time)

Deraniyagala Divisional Secretariat is a Divisional Secretariat of Kegalle District, of Sabaragamuwa Province, Sri Lanka.

== Demography ==
Religion in Deraniyagala DS Division (2012)
1. Buddhist (78.2%)
2. Hindu (19.7%)
3. Muslim (0.10%)
4. Roman Catholic (1.50%)
5. Other Christian (0.50%)
6. Other (0.00%)
