= Appallagoda Ambalama =

Traditional resting place in Sri Lanka

The Appallagoda Ambalama is a traditional resting place, or ambalama, in a rural environment in the village of Appallagoda, 6 km (3.7 mi) from the city of Kandy in Sri Lanka. Built in 1922, it is an example of traditional, indigenous architecture and is known as the largest stone ambalama in the Kandy region.

== Architecture ==
The Appallagoda Ambalama has a floor area of approximately 80 m^{2} (860 sq ft) and measures 5.6 m (18 ft) from floor to pinnacle. On the inside, around the ambalama, are stone seats. Caste differences dictated the different levels in the seating area.

The roof is supported by two sets of stone columns, twelve externally and four internally. The ambalama has two broken stone columns on the northeastern side. The local villagers claim that the columns were constructed this way deliberately when the ambalama was built to ward off inauspicious omens.

The roof has a brass pinnacle that is indicative of the architectural pattern of that period. A prominent feature at the front of this ambalama is the stone "pinthäliya", a traditional container for drinking water.

== History ==
There is no written documentation about the Appallagoda Ambalama and its history. One theory to explain this absence is that this building is a recent addition to the list of ambalamas in Sri Lanka.

According to Local villagers, the Appallagoda Ambalama was built in 1922 to house trade parties. It was built under the orders of the local"arachchi" (head of the village) at that time.

A folktale explains the four names engraved in the four internal stone columns in the ambalam. The story says that these four names belonged to some "thugs" from the southern part of Sri Lanka who settled in Kandy. The thugs supposedly used their magical powers to engrave their names on the columns.
