= Mawanella Divisional Secretariat =

- Divisional Secretariat
- Interactive map of Mawanella Divisional Secretariat
- Country: Sri Lanka
- Province: Sabaragamuwa Province
- District: Kegalle District

Population (2010)
  - Total: 108,000
- Time zone: UTC+5:30 (Sri Lanka Standard Time)

Mawanella Divisional Secretariat is a Divisional Secretariat of Kegalle District, of Sabaragamuwa Province, Sri Lanka.

== Demography ==
Total population is 126,026 as of recent census report (2024) Religion wise statistics are as follows
1. Buddhist 82,393 (65.3%)
2. Hindu 1164 (0.90%)
3. Muslim 41,933 (33.3%)
4. Roman Catholic 406 (0.30%)
5. Other Christian 125 (0.20%)
6. Other (0.00%)
