= Maha Oya Pumped Storage Power Station =

Pumped-storage power station in Sri Lanka

- Country: Sri Lanka
- Location: Aranayaka; Nawalapitiya
- Coordinates: 7°06′39″N 80°28′33″E

Power generation
- Nameplate capacity: 600 MW

The Maha Oya Pumped Storage Power Station is a 600MW pumped-storage power station being developed in the Aranayaka and Nawalapitiya areas of Sri Lanka. Upon completion, it will be the country's first energy storage facility, and one of the largest power stations in Sri Lanka in terms of nameplate capacity. The Maha Oya facility is designed to store excess renewable energy from solar and wind sources, thus creating supporting infrastructure for Sri Lanka's target of generating 70% of its electricity from renewable sources by 2030. The project is estimated to cost between $800 million to $1 billion.

== Reservoirs ==
As with typical pumped-storage facilities, the Maha Oya Pumped Storage facility will consist of two reservoirs in Aranayaka and Nawalapitiya, which will be connected by a 2.5-kilometre (1.6 mi) penstock. The upper reservoir will have a storage capacity of 6 hours.

== See also ==
- List of power stations in Sri Lanka
- List of pumped-storage hydroelectric power stations
