= Panavitiya Ambalama =

Coordinates: 7°24′25.1″N 80°10′23.8″E

- පනාවිටිය අම්බලම
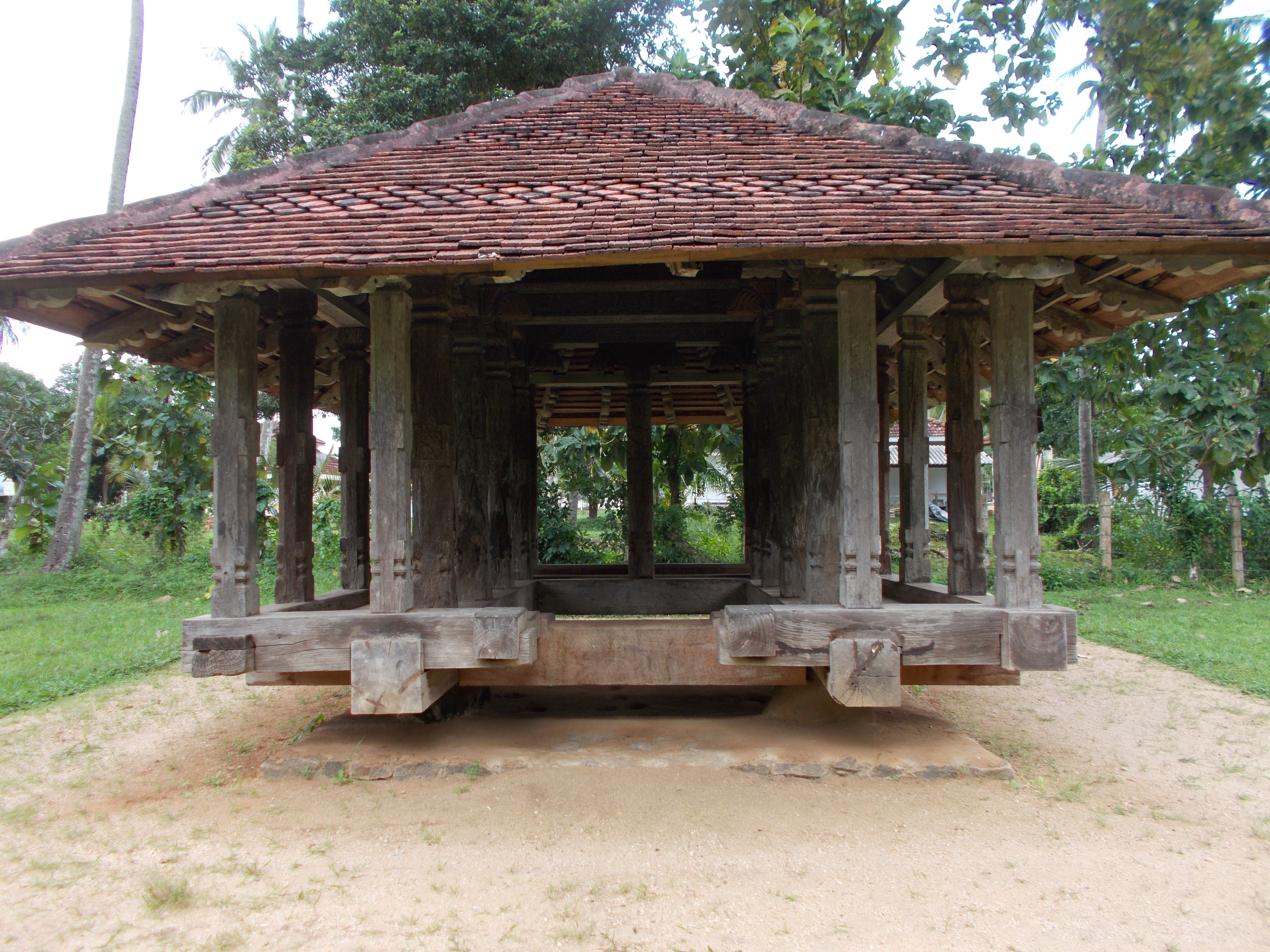
- Panavitiya Ambalama
- Interactive map of the Panavitiya Ambalama area

General information
- Status: Preserved
- Architectural style: Ambalama
- Location: Panavitiya, Kurunegala District, Sri Lanka

Design and construction
- Known for: Wooden carvings

Panavitiya Ambalama (Sinhala: පනාවිටිය අම්බලම) is an Ambalama situated in Sri Lanka. An ambalama (අම්බලම) is a place constructed for pilgrims, traders, and travellers to rest. Panavitiya Ambalama is a place famous for its ornate wood carvings which are regarded to be on par with those at Embekka Devalaya, Lankathilaka, and Gadaladeniya Viharas.

== Location ==
Panavitiya Ambalama is situated in the village of Panavitiya (පනාවිටිය) off Matiyagane (මැටියගනේ) in the Kurunegala District, Sri Lanka. The location is accessible by vehicles as of 2019.

One of the routes that can be taken to reach the Ambalama from Colombo is by taking the Negombo-Kurunegala highway to Matiyagane (මැටියගනේ) school junction via Dambadeniya (දඹදෙණිය) and then turning left at the junction onto Dangolla (දංගොල්ල) road. Kajugas handiya (කජුගස් හන්දිය) bus stop can be reached by continuing on Dangolla (දංගොල්ල) road for another 2 km. Panavitiya Ambalama can be reached by travelling another 1.5 km along the road after turning left at the Kajugas handiya (කජුගස් හන්දිය) bus stop.

== History ==
It is said that this was erected in the 18th century or before.

The Ambalama is believed to be built to the wayside of two routes used by travellers on foot. One route is said to be a footpath made during the Dambadeniya era. This route is purported to have originated from the eastern gates of the Dambadenya palace and follows northeast passing by the Panavitiya Ambalama and travels further northeast towards Yapahuwa, passing through another Ambalama now identified as the Karagahagedara Ambalama (Sinhala: කරගහගෙදර අම්බලම). The other, more ancient route accessible from Panavitiya Amblama was said to be towards the Anuradhapura (Sinhala: අනුරාධපුර) city.

By the early 1960s, the Ambalama had fallen into disrepair as evidenced by the photographs taken at that time. Most of the timber framework had decayed and the roof was thatched with cadjun instead of the original brick tiles. In the following year, the Ambalama had completely collapsed.

This is conserved by the Archaeological Department, Sri Lanka.

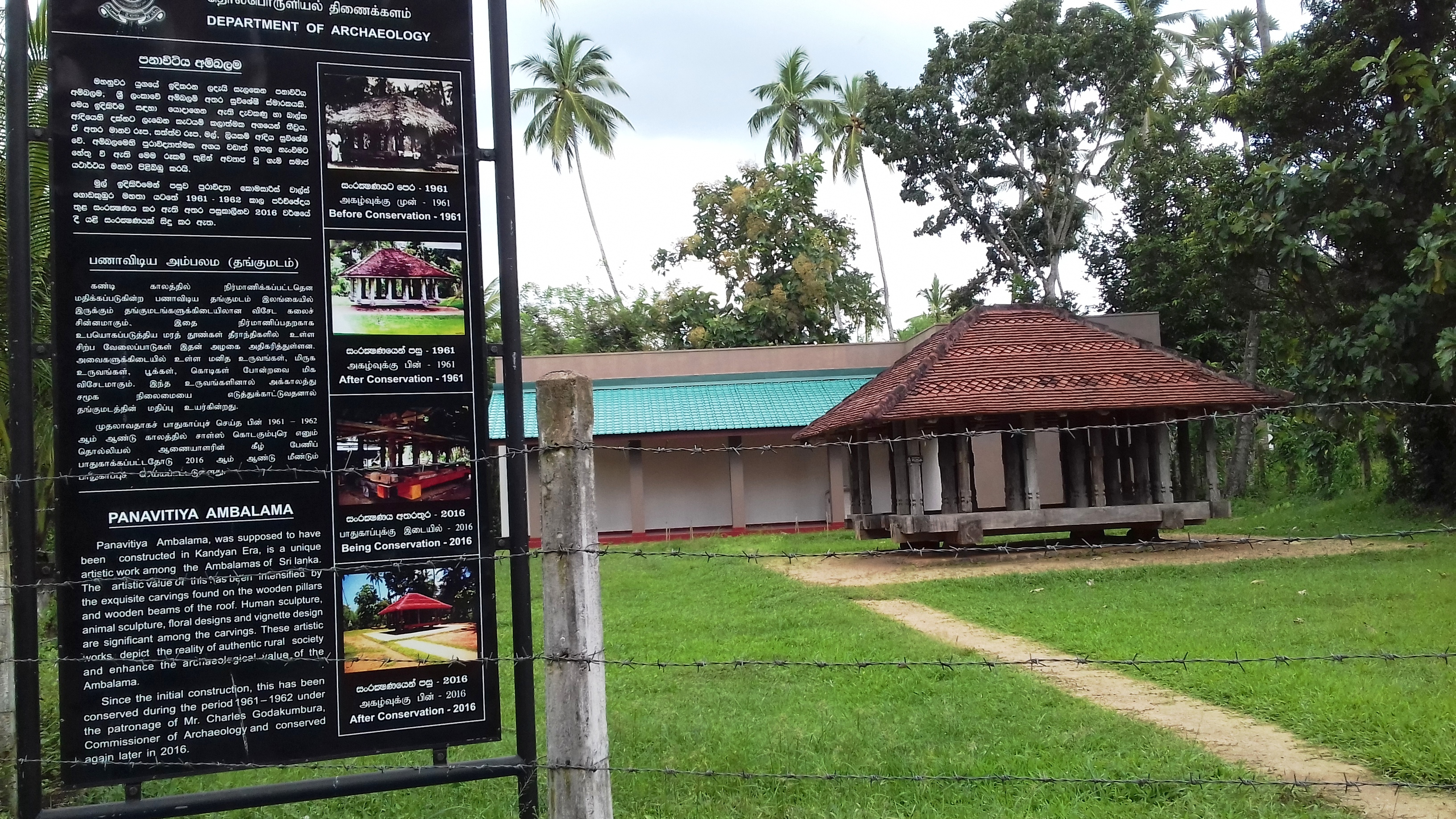
A view of the Panavitiya Ambalama with the sign board erected by the Department of Archaeology (Sri Lanka), showing the restoration stages of ambalama

== Structure ==
The original base holding the wooden structure of the Panavitiya Ambalama was a quadrangular platform, filled with stone pebbles and crushed rocks and raised about half a foot from the ground. The platform measures 12 feet 4 inches (approximately 3.7 m) by 9 feet 6 inches (approximately 2.9 m). The wooden frame was constructed on four round boulders, each about a foot in height, and placed at the four corners of the stone-filled base. This arrangement on the stone slabs kept the wooden floor and posts of the Ambalama away from dampness and termite attack. In later conservation stages carried out by the Archaeological Department, Sri Lanka, a secondary base of granite was built over the original base to protect it.

Four timber logs, each about 4 feet in diameter were connected at seating height over the stone boulders at the base. These four logs serve as the building template to fit the four main wooden posts supporting the roof. Panavitiya Ambalama comprises a total of 28 wooden posts. On either side of the two main entrance pillars, 12 posts, arranged in two by six rows parallel to the main pillar, run towards the back of the ambalama. Of the 28 posts 9 are set in the interior and the rest make up the "outer set". The 9 inner posts are approximately 6 feet high while the outer set of 19 posts are approximately 5 1/2 feet high.

The posts are connected to the roof by a decorated pekada (පේකඩ -pillar head).

== Wood Carvings at Panavitiya Ambalama ==
Panavitiya Ambalama is famous for its elaborate and beautiful wood carvings which decorate the entire ambalama. Some of the carvings date back to the 18th century.

The body of the posts is carved in an octagonal shape with a square panel at the middle of each post. Each of the square panels of all the 9 inner posts is decorated with elaborate carvings. There are 36 such panel carvings. Additionally, the pillar heads (connecting the posts to the roof), beams, rafters, and reepers are also richly carved.

Carvings like Gajasinghe Katayama, Hansa Puttuwa, flower designs, and sculptures of dancers can be seen. Other than that, carvings about day-to-day life can also be found. Many wood carvings that could be seen in Embekka Devalaya could also be seen here.

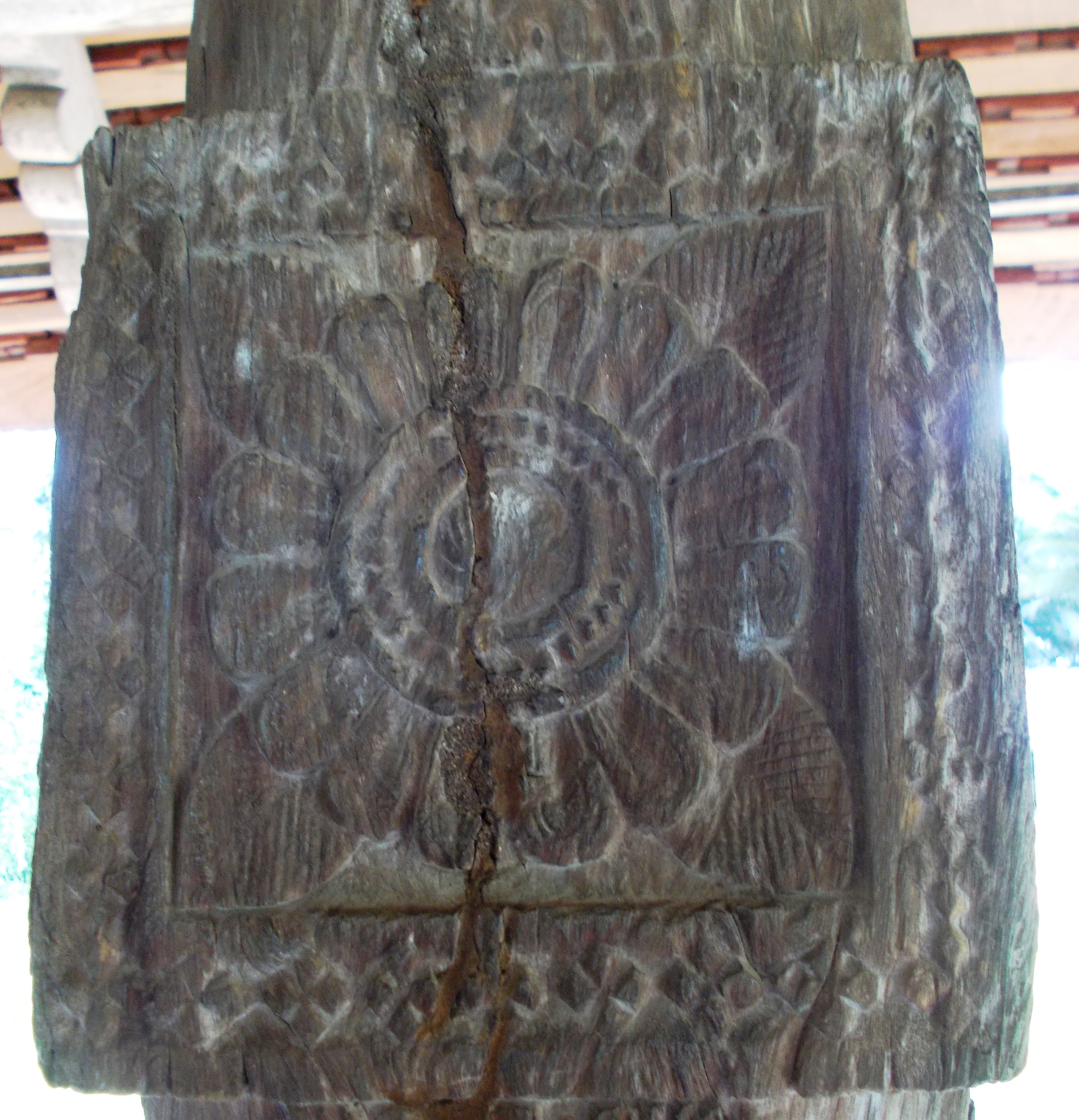
Panavitiya Ambalama wood panel carving - An ornate carving of a lotus flower in one of the wooden pillars in Panavitiya Ambalama (November 2019)

Panavitiya Ambalama wood panel carving - An ornate carving of a dancing girl in traditional Kandyan costume (November 2019)

== Gallery ==
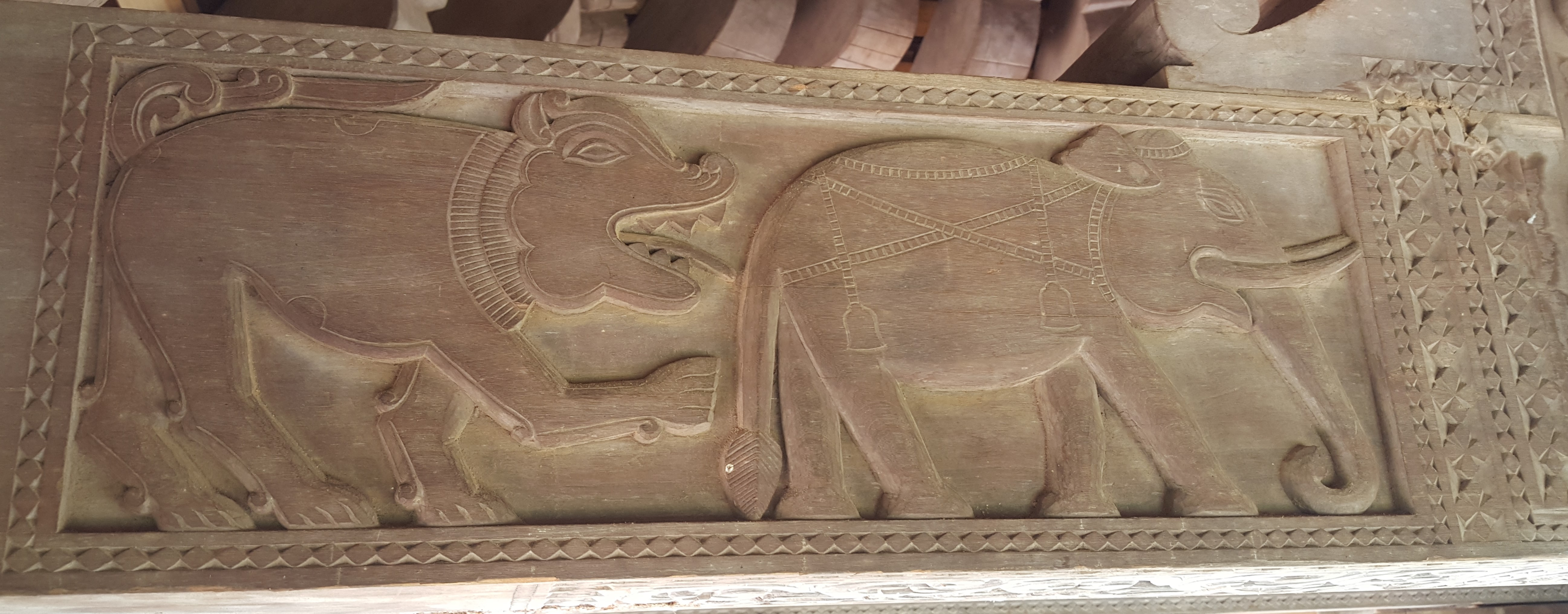
Roof beam carving- Lion following an elephant

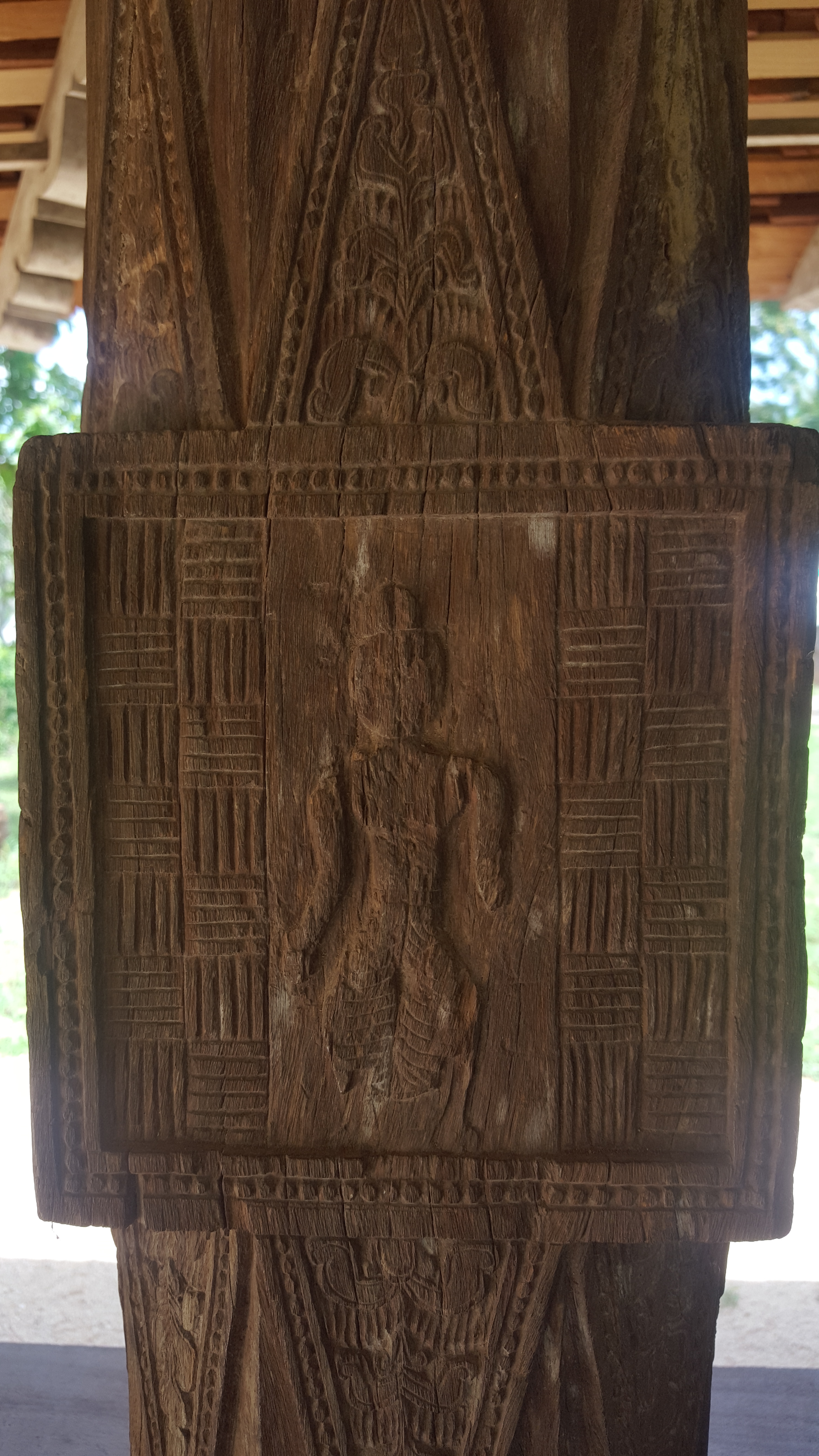
Panel carving- Nattuwa (නැට්ටුවා -Dancer)

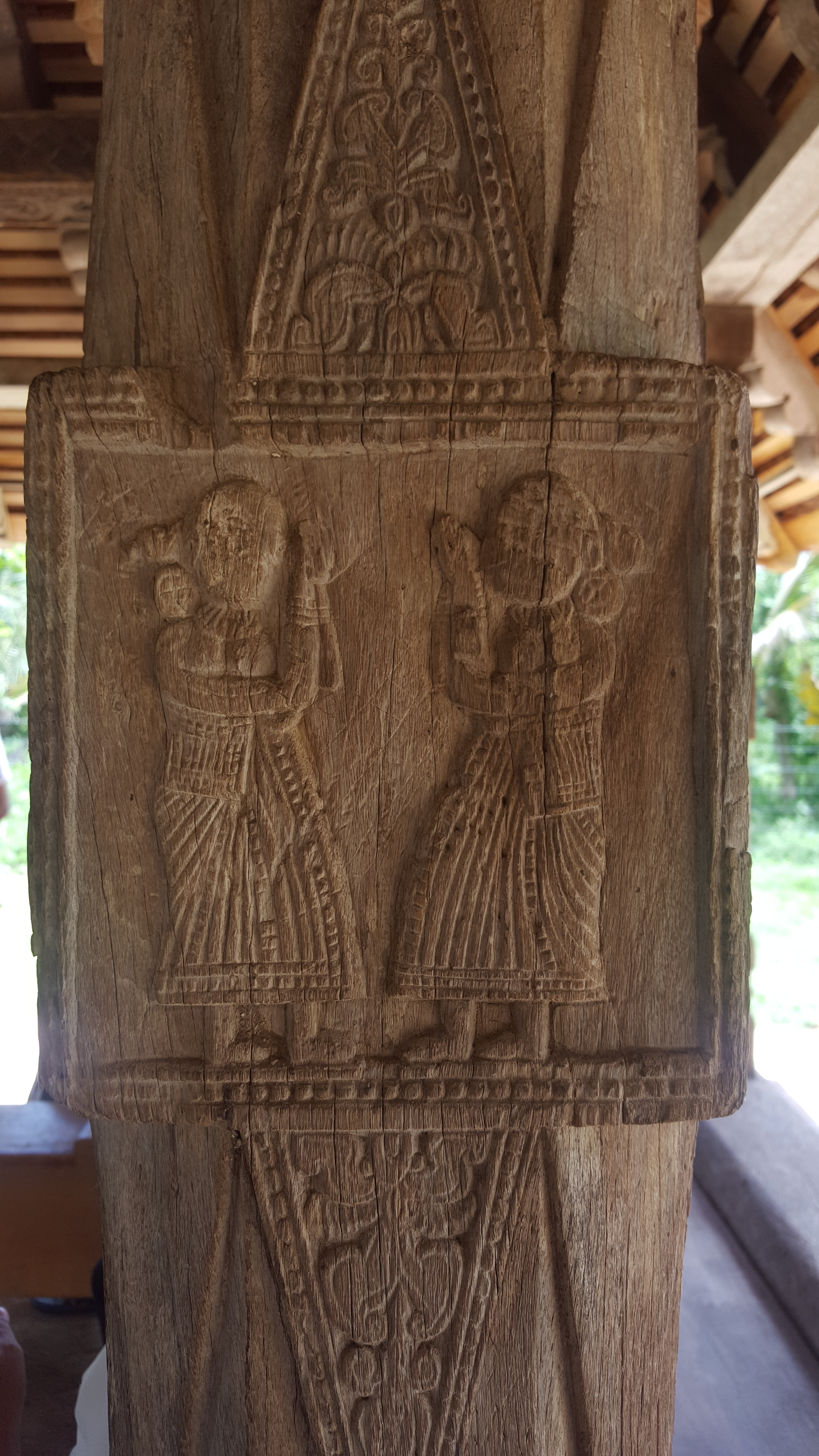
Panel carving- Aachara samaachaara (ආචාර සමාචාර- carving depicting a greeting scene between two women)

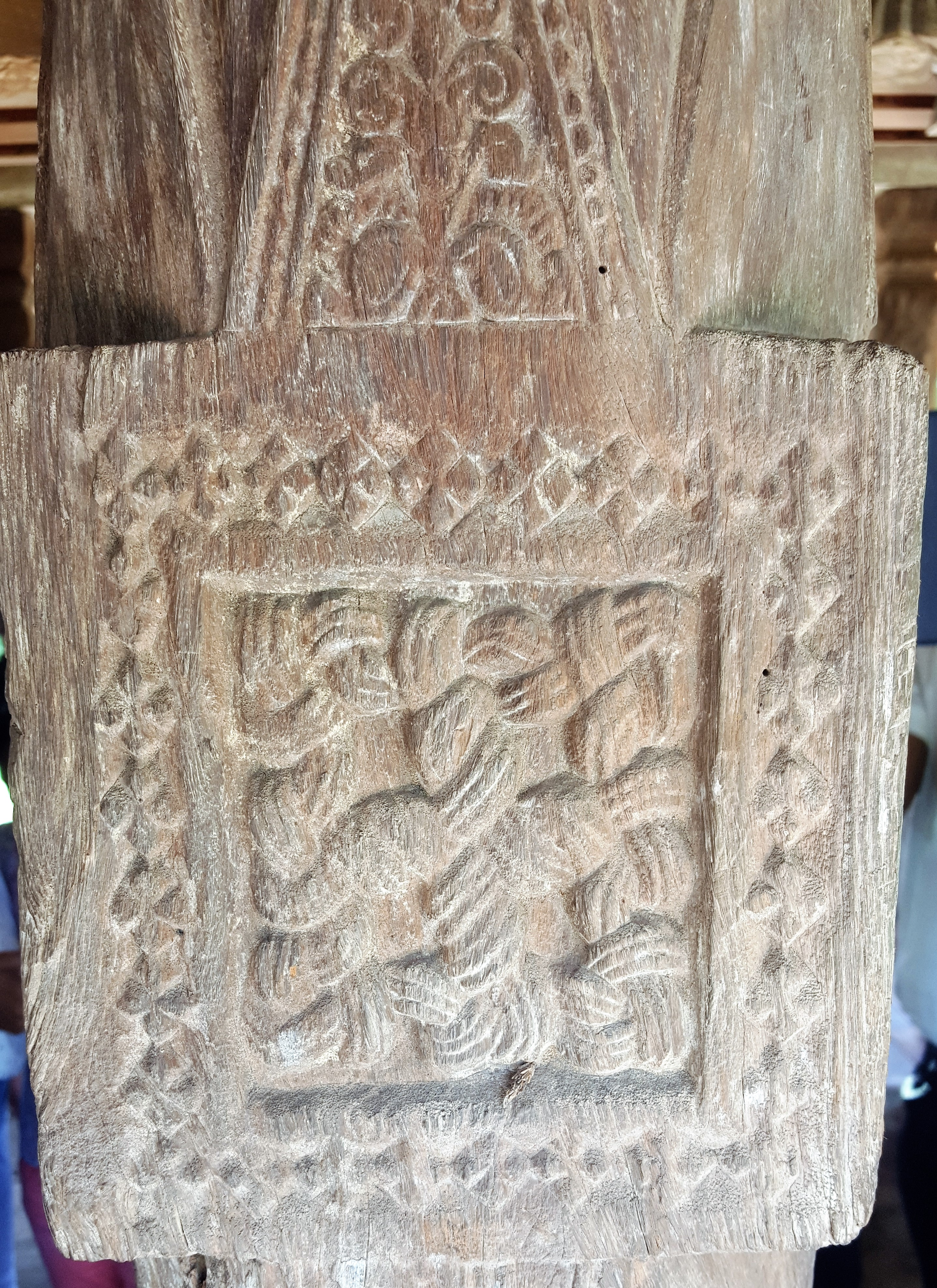
Panel carving-Lanu getaya (ලණු ගැටය - Twisted rope pattern)

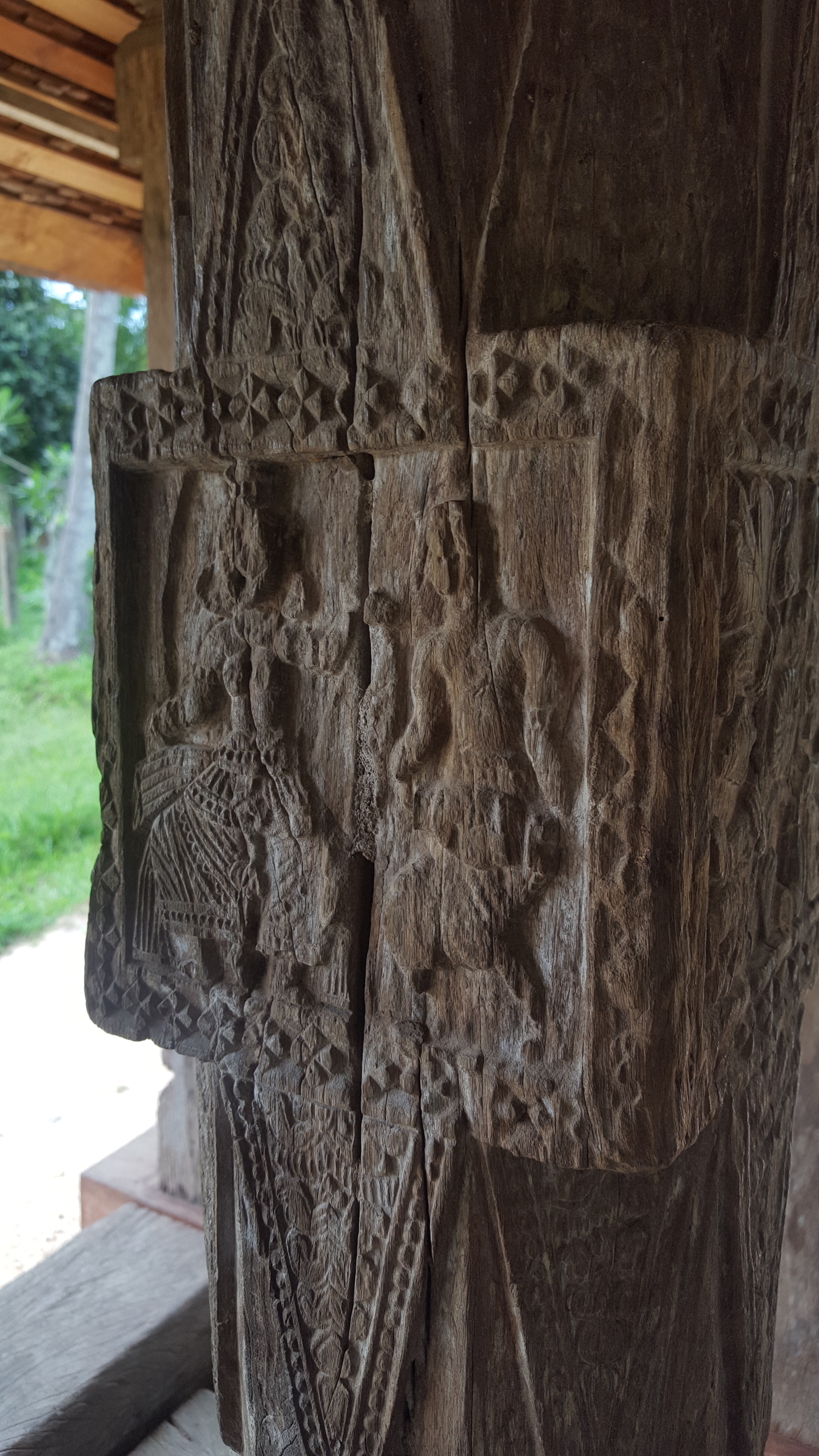
Panel carving- Nalgana saha berakaru-(නළඟන සහ බෙරකරු- carving depicting a dancing girl in traditional costume dancing to the beat of a short drum)
