= Dippitiya =

- Village
- Country: Sri Lanka
- Province: Sabaragamuwa Province
- Time zone: UTC+5:30 (Sri Lanka Standard Time)

Dippitiya is a village in Sri Lanka. It is located within Sabaragamuwa Province.
