= Mawanella Bridge =

- Coordinates: 7°15′1.5″N 80°26′36.5″E
- Carries: 2 lanes
- Crosses: Maha Oya
- Locale: Mawanella

Characteristics
- Design: Arch bridge
- Material: Masonry bricks
- Total length: 70 m (230 ft)
- Width: 7.5 m (25 ft)
- Height: 4.8 m (16 ft)
- No. of spans: 4

History
- Construction end: 1833; 193 years ago

Location
- Interactive map of Mawanella Bridge

Mawanella Bridge (Sinhala: මාවනැල්ල ගඩොල් පාලමේ ඉතිහාසය) is the oldest operational brick bridge in Sri Lanka. The bridge was built in 1833 in Mawanella over the Maha Oya. The arch bridge has four arches, with each arch 15 m (49 ft) in length and is constructed entirely from bricks.

In 1820 the British commenced construction of the Colombo - Kandy Road, under the orders of the Governor of Ceylon, Sir Robert Wilmot-Horton. The construction of the road was supervised by Captain William Francis Dawson. Five bridges had to be constructed with the road, one being the Arch Bridge over the Maha Oya in Mawanella, the other four were the Ferry Bridge over Kelani River, the Arch Bridge over Hingula Oya in Hingula, the Pilimathalawa Bridge across Nanu Oya and the Satin Bridge over Mahaweli River in Peradeniya. Construction of the bridge commenced in 1832 and was completed in 1833.

The bridge was formally recognised by the Government as a protected archaeological site on 1 November 1996.

In 2005 a modern concrete bridge was constructed to the north of the historic bridge.

== See also ==
- Nine Arch Bridge, Demodara
