= Aranayaka Divisional Secretariat =

- Divisional Secretariat
- Interactive map of Aranayaka Divisional Secretariat
- Coordinates: 7°9′59″N 80°26′32″E
- Country: Sri Lanka
- Province: Sabaragamuwa Province
- District: Kegalle District
- Time zone: UTC+5:30 (Sri Lanka Standard Time)

Aranayaka Divisional Secretariat is a Divisional Secretariat of Kegalle District, of Sabaragamuwa Province, Sri Lanka.

== Demography ==
Religion in Aranayaka DS Division (2012)
1. Buddhist (90.0%)
2. Hindu (1.90%)
3. Muslim (7.60%)
4. Roman Catholic (0.30%)
5. Other Christian (0.20%)
6. Other (0.00%)
