= Rambukkana Divisional Secretariat =

- Divisional Secretariat
- Interactive map of Rambukkana Divisional Secretariat
- Country: Sri Lanka
- Province: Sabaragamuwa Province
- District: Kegalle District
- Time zone: UTC+5:30 (Sri Lanka Standard Time)

Rambukkana Divisional Secretariat is a Divisional Secretariat of Kegalle District, of Sabaragamuwa Province, Sri Lanka.

Pinnawala elephant orphanage is located inside the Rambukkana Divisional Secretariat area.

== Demography ==
Religion in Rambukkana DS Division (2012)
1. Buddhist (91.0%)
2. Hindu (1.00%)
3. Muslim (3.40%)
4. Roman Catholic (1.60%)
5. Other Christian (3.00%)
6. Other (0.00%)
