= Ambalama =

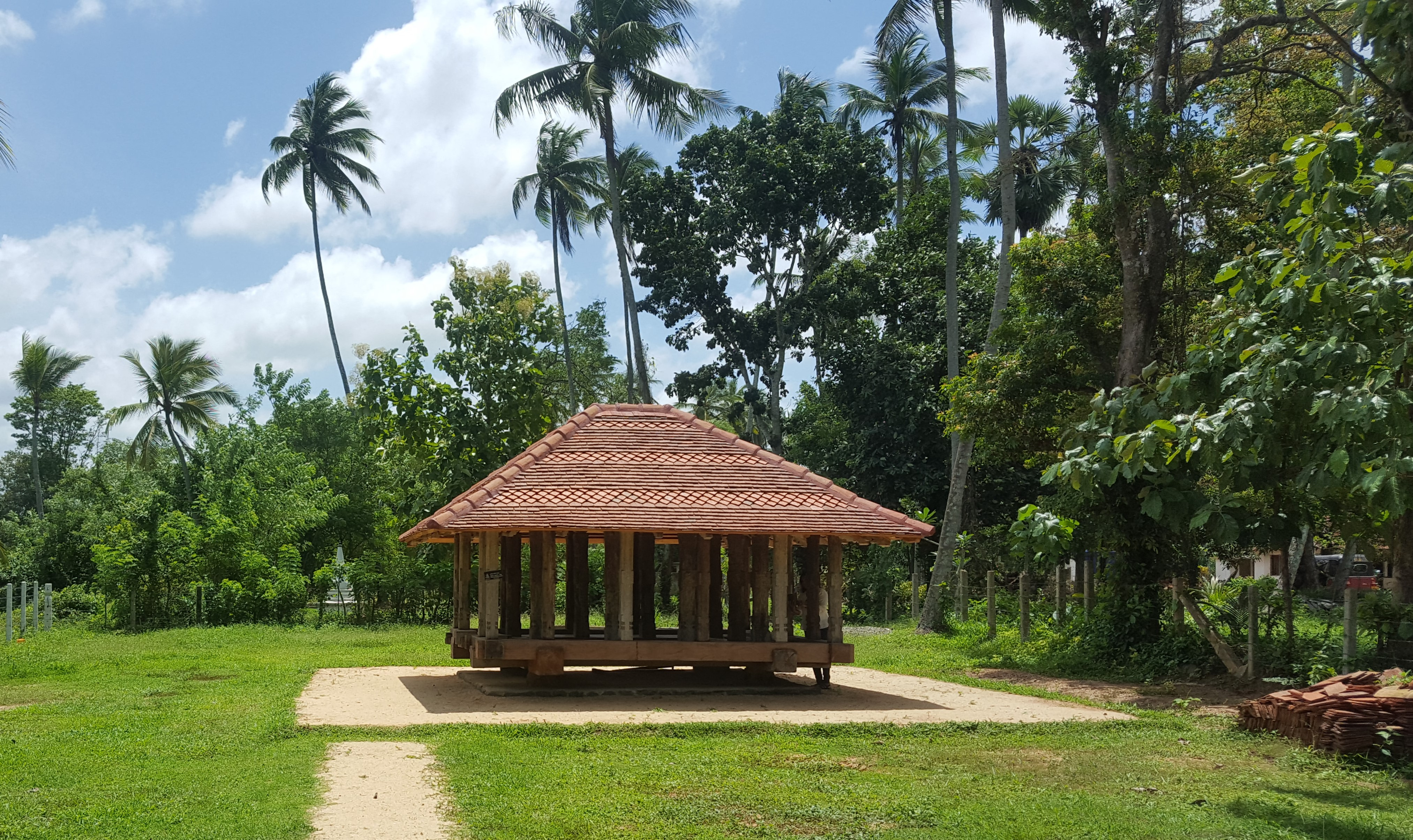
Ambalama from Panavitiya dating to 1700s or before

An ambalama (Sinhala: අම්බලම) is a place constructed for pilgrims, traders and travellers to rest in Sri Lanka. This is a simple structure designed to provide shelter for the travellers. The last examples of anbalange remained until about the end of the 1970s. There were no charges involved in using an Ambalama.

== History ==
According to Anuradha Seneviratna and Benjamin Polk pilgrimage rest-houses like Ambalamas were well established before 230 BC as Mauryan kings issued orders carved on stones or iron columns for planting of avenues of trees and for building shelters for the comfort of pilgrims. Ambalamas in Sri Lanka, many of them several centuries old, have been kept close to their youth by the continuous replacements of decaying parts and are among the oldest wood structures in Sri Lanka. Prominent families of a locality donate and maintain a shelter, or they are put up by the villagers as a place to rest and meet.

== In literature ==
In Salalihini and Gira sandeshas, there are references to Ambalamas.

== Prominent Ambalamas ==
- Appallagoda Ambalama
- Giruwa Ambalama
- Kadugannawa Ambalama
- Panavitiya Ambalama
- Pita Kotte Gal Ambalama
- Karagahagedara Ambalama
- Padiwita Ambalama
- Marassana Ambalama
- Awariyawala Ambalama
- Godamunne Ambalama
- Kandewela Ambalama
- Hewawissa Ambalama
- Karalliyadda Ambalama
- Udunuwara Pitawala (Pallepitawala) Ambalama
- Patha Hewaheta Elikewala Ambalama

== See also ==
- Kalithattu
- Pati
- Flophouse
