= Mawanella =

Mawanella මාවනැල්ල மாவனல்லை
- Town
- Location within Sri Lanka
- Coordinates: 7°15′12″N 80°26′47″E
- Country: Sri Lanka
- District: Kegalle District
- Province: Sabaragamuwa Province
- Division: Mawanella Division

Area
  - Total: 118 km^{2} (46 sq mi)

Population (2012)
  - Total: 111,727
  - Density: 946.8/km^{2} (2,452/sq mi)
- Time zone: UTC+5:30 (Sri Lanka Standard Time Zone)
- Postal Code: 71500
- Area code: 035

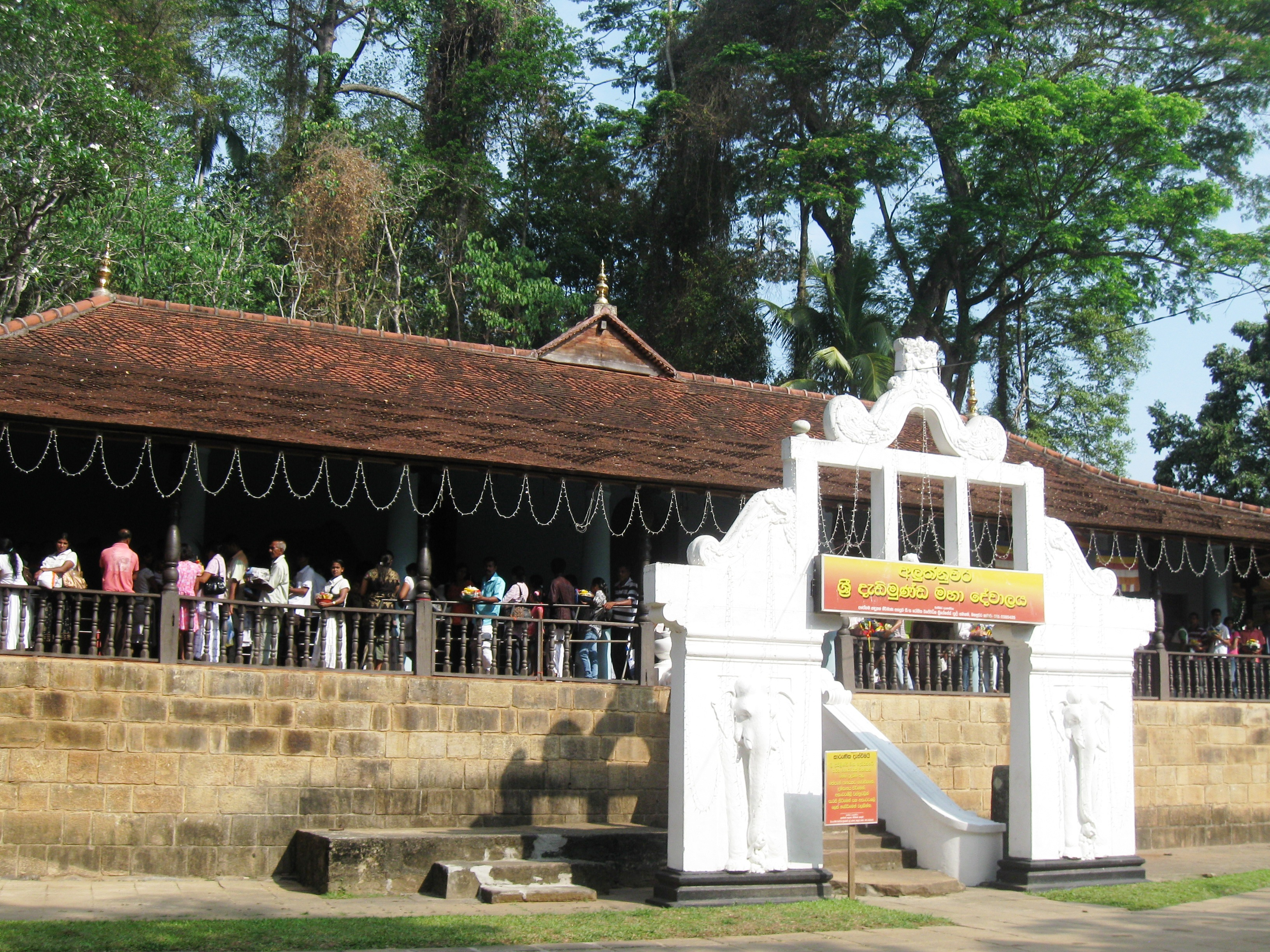
Aluthnuwara Dedimunda Devalaya in Mawanella

Mawanella is a town which belongs to the Kegalle district in the Sabaragamuwa Province of Sri Lanka. It lies between Kegalle and Kadugannawa along the Colombo-Kandy road. The area consists of four administrative areas, namely Mawanella, Aranayake, Rambukkana and Hemmathagama.

== Demographics ==
Mawanella Division has a population of 126,026. Urban areas of the Town are mostly inhabited by Sinhalese and Muslim people respectively. Others include Malay, Burgher, Indian Tamils.

Ethnicity in Mawanella Area
Population	Percent
Sinhalese	58.15%
Muslims	40.08%
Tamils	1.20%
Others	0.50%

Source:statistics.gov.lk

== Economy ==
Business is the way of living for majority of the people. There are plenty of Teachers in this town. Education sector also is another income source of the people in this area.

== Products ==
The crops include rice, tea, rubber, pepper, cardamom, nutmeg, vegetables and various types spices. Mawanella is also famous for its traditional handicrafts, especially the pottery, brass-ware and tobacco related industry. There are over 50 pottery shops in Annasigala area along the Colombo to Kandy road.

== Climate and Geology ==
Mawanella belongs to the Tropical Evergreen region of central Sri Lanka. The altitude of the area varies from 180m to 260 m above sea level. The average annual rainfall lies between 2500 and 4500 ml, and temperature of the region ranges between 22 degrees and 35 degrees Celsius. It receives most of the rain from Southwest Monsoon. The average wind speed has been measured to be approximately 7.2 km/hour and humidity in the range lies between 57% and 90%. The whole region is mountainous, but the most famous mountain is the Bathalegala or Bible Rock. Devanagala and Alagalla are another two mountains in the area. There is also a waterway called Maa Oya running very close to the town and there is a village called Bootawa, where two waterways called Maa Oya and Higulu Oya are joining near a Bridge called Bootawa Bridge situated in Mawanella to Rambukkana Road. The historic Mawanella Bridge built to cross the Maha Oya by the British, during their colonial ruler. A modern concrete bridge was constructed in 2005, immediately north of the old bridge.

== Government/Religious Education ==
There are 3 educational divisions -Aranayake, Mawanella and Rambukana under Mawanella Educational Zone. There are 22,019 students and 54 schools in Mawanella, 16,517 students and 43 schools in Rambukkana and 12,964 students and 48 schools in Aranayake division totaling 51,500 students and 145 schools. 19 of the 145 total schools are Muslim schools. The most prestigious schools in the area are Mayurapada Central College, Rivisanda Central College, Zahira College, and Baduriya College. Buddhist Sunday schools a.k.a. "Daham Pasal", Islam schools such as Ahadiya or Madrasah and other religious schools provide a key element in religious education.

== Private Education ==
Private educational institutes also play a major role in education. There are three international schools and large number of tuition institutes in the area. A large percentage of students seek these institutions, although the quality and standards of them remains questionable.

== History ==
Mawanella is historically famous for Uthuwan Kande Soora Saradiel - a native who fought against British colonialism. He is known as the Robin Hood of Ceylon/ Sri Lanka as he looted the wealth from British officers and their local counterparts only to distribute it among the poor villagers. Deekirikewagela Saradiel was born in 1832 to his father Deekirikewage Adasi Appu - a bullocart driver and Molligoda Pichohami - a small coffee shop owner. The natives were under heavy economical and political pressure from unfair taxes under British rule and were rebelling against as best way they could. Saradiel was accompanied by fellow natives namely Mammale Marikkar, Baya, Hawadiya, Samat etc.

In order to evade his arrest, Saradiel, decided not to remain in one single place permanently, for the sake of his own safety. While he was thus taking refuge in the homes of his friends, on March 17, 1864, a police team under the command of Head Constable Amath surrounded the house where Saradiel had been hiding, with the help of some of the residents of that area who had given them the tip-off, which resulted in the death on the spot of George Van Haught, a member of the police search party, due to a gunshot wound.

Also, while Muttusamy and Christian Appu, two of his other accomplices received grievous injuries and two others were slightly injured, while they were thus engaged in the fracas, Saradiel and Mammale Marikkar succeeded in escaping. Subsequently, the Police team including Police Sergeant Mahath and Police Constable Sabab, set out on March 21, 1864, to arrest Saradiel on the information given by the informant, one Sirimala. Based on this information, when the Police team surrounded the house belonging to Abdul Cader of Mawenelle searching for Saradiel, he attempted to shoot Sergeant Mahath.

But Sergeant Mahath outsmarted Saradiel by shooting him first, which resulted in Saradiel falling to the ground from the upstairs where he had been hiding. Due to a gunshot fired from the upstairs by Mammale Marikkar, a member of Saradiel’s gang, the Police Constable Saban was killed. This was the first time ever a police officer died on duty in Sri Lankan Police history and since, March 21 is commemorated as the Police Day. Saradiel was later executed by the British after a short trial.

== People from Mawanella ==
- General Cyril Ranatunga
