= Maha Oya =

Major stream in the Sabaragamuwa Province of Sri Lanka

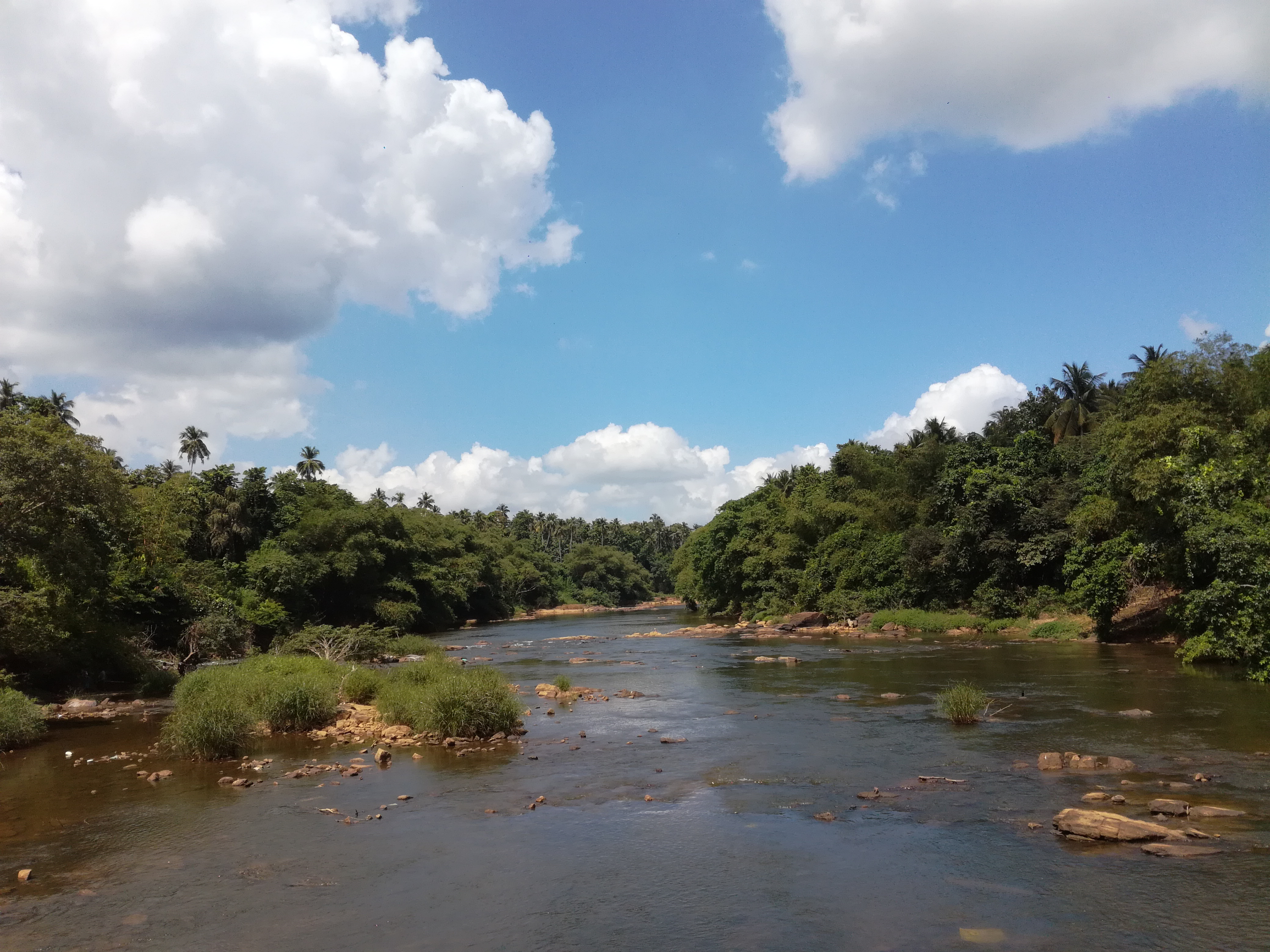
- Maha Oya,Crossing Kotadeniyawa Road,Sri Lanka.

- Location within Sri Lanka

Physical characteristics
- Source
  - location: Nawalapitiya, Aranayake
- Mouth
  - location: Kochchikade, Negombo
  - coordinates: 07°16′21″N 79°50′34″E
  - elevation: Sea level
- Length: 134 km (83 mi)

Basin features
- Waterfalls: Asupini Ella
- Bridges: Mawanella Bridge

The Maha Oya (Sinhala: මහ ඔය, lit. 'Great River') is a major watercourse in the Sabaragamuwa Province of Sri Lanka. It measures approximately 134 km (83 mi) in length. It runs across four provinces and five districts. The Maha Oya has 14 water supply networks to serve the need of water and more than 1 million people live by the river.

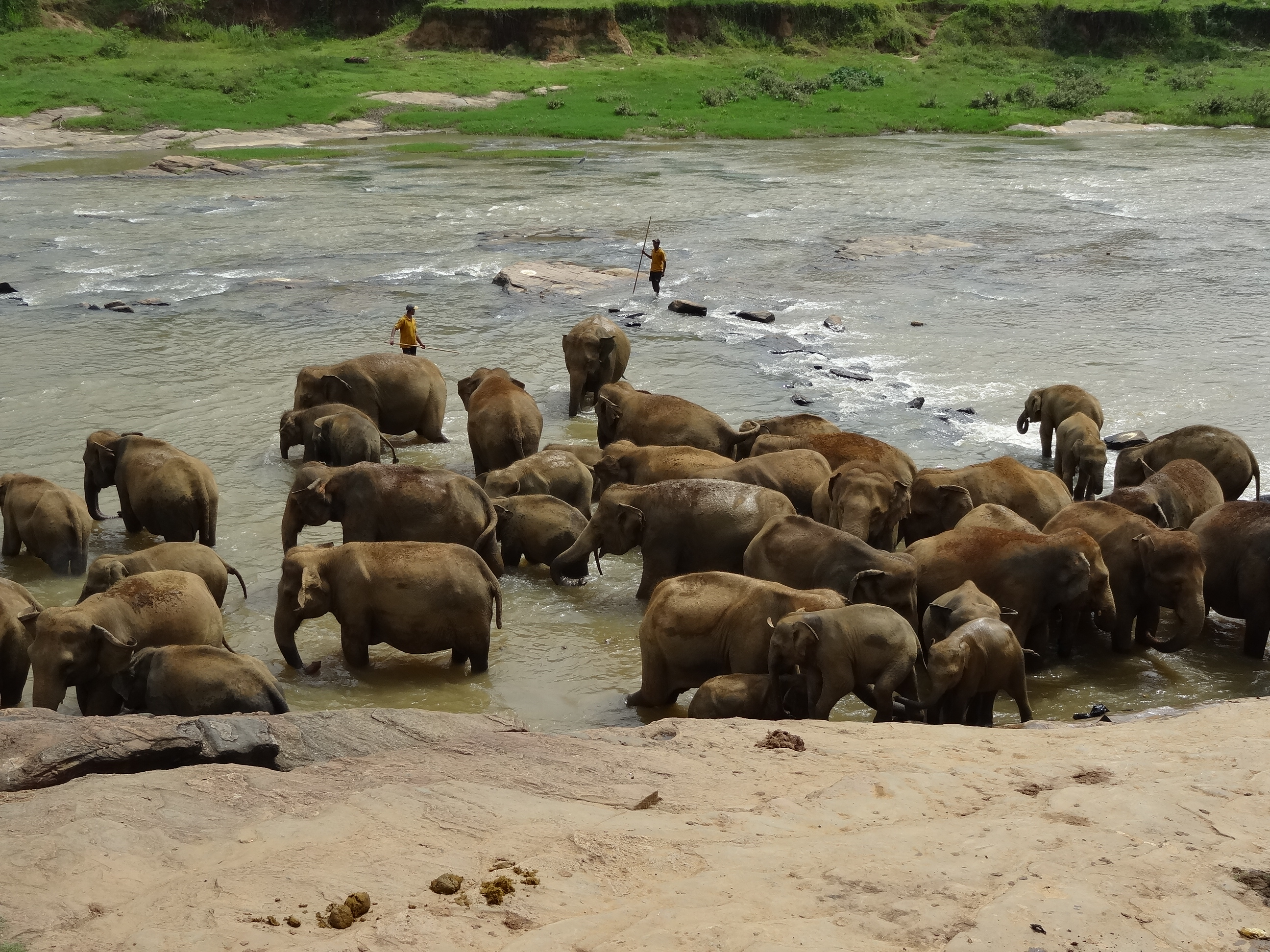
Maha Oya passes Pinnawala elephant orphanage area

Its catchment area receives approximately 3,644 million cubic metres of rain per year, and approximately 34 percent of the water reaches the sea. It has a catchment area of 1,510 square kilometres.

== See also ==
- List of dams and reservoirs in Sri Lanka
- List of rivers of Sri Lanka
- Maha Oya Pumped Storage Power Station
