= Kegalle District =

Kegalle District කෑගල්ල දිස්ත්‍රික්කය கேகாலை மாவட்டம்
- Administrative District
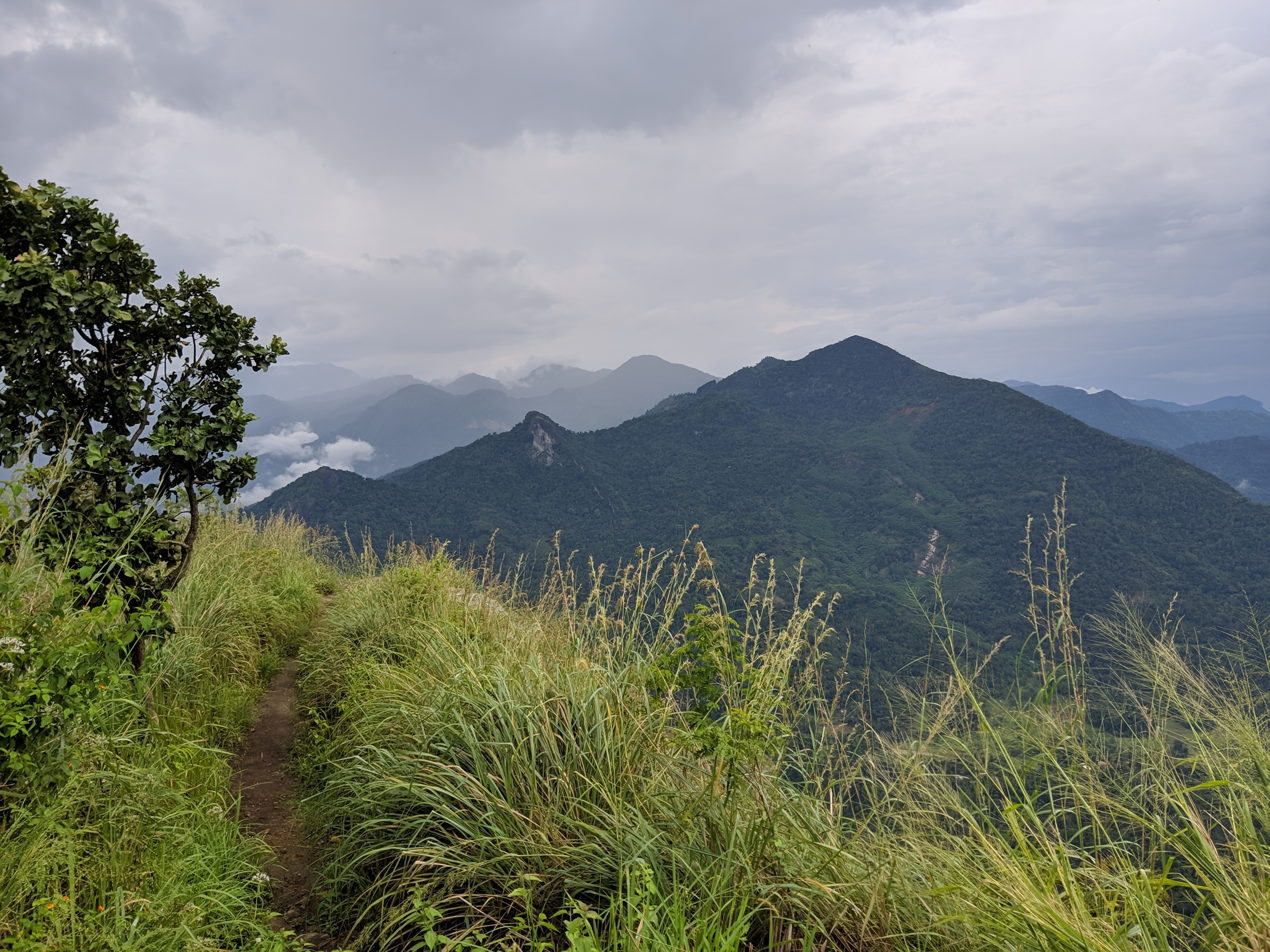
- Bible Rock, Kegalle district

- Map of Sri Lanka with Kegalle District highlighted
- Coordinates: 7°18′N 80°24′E
- Country: Sri Lanka
- Province: Sabaragamuwa Province
- Largest Town: Kegalle
- Divisions: List: Divisional Secretariats: 11; Grama Niladhari: 573

Government
  - District Secretary: Mahinda S. Weerasooriya
  - Local: List: Municipal Councils: -; Urban Councils: 1; Pradeishiya Sabhas: 11

Area
  - Total: 1,693 km^{2} (654 sq mi)
  - Land: 1,685 km^{2} (651 sq mi)
  - Water: 8 km^{2} (3.1 sq mi)

Population (2012)
  - Total: 837,179
  - Density: 496.8/km^{2} (1,287/sq mi)
- Time zone: UTC+05:30 (Sri Lanka)
- ISO 3166 code: LK-92

Kegalle is a district in Sabaragamuwa Province, Sri Lanka. It is one of 25 districts of Sri Lanka, the second level administrative division of the country. The district is administered by a District Secretariat headed by a District Secretary (previously known as a Government Agent) appointed by the central government of Sri Lanka. It was a former Dissavani of Sri Lanka.

It covers an area of 1,693 km^{2} (654 sq mi). The district has a population of 837,179 according to 2012 Census, which is approximately 4.0% of the total population of Sri Lanka.

== Physical information ==
The district transitions from the coastal plain in the west to the central highlands in the east. The height of the western region is 50 m (160 ft) above sea level while the eastern region exceeds 1,800 m (5,900 ft). Rubber cultivation has stretched over most of the area of the District and minor export crops from the district include coffee, cocoa, pepper, clove and nutmeg. Sri Lanka's best graphite mine is situated at Bogala in Kegalle District. The extent of the District is 1,692.8 km^{2} (653.6 sq mi).

== Major cities ==
- Kegalle (Municipal Council)

== Other towns ==
- Ambepussa
- Aranayaka
- Bulathkohupitiya
- Dehiovita
- Deraniyagala
- Galigamuwa
- Ganthuna
- Hemmathagama
- Karawanella
- Kitulgala
- Kotiyakumbura
- Mawanella
- Rambukkana
- Ruwanwella
- Thalgaspitiya
- Yatiyanthota
- Warakapola

== Demographics ==
Population (2005)
Administration Type	Number
Female	521,683
Male	504,541
Total Population	1026,224
No. of Families	296,348

=== Ethnic distribution ===
Ethnicity in Kegalle District (2024)
1. Sinhala (84.6%)
2. Sri Lankan Moors (8.25%)
3. Sri Lankan Tamils (4.65%)
4. Hill Tamils (2.44%)
5. Others (0.06%)

Most of the population are Sinhalese. Indian Tamils brought by the British as indentured labourers to work in tea states makes a significant minority.

Ethnic group	Population	%
Sinhala	674,665	85.89%
Sri Lankan Tamil	14,908	1.90%
Indian Tamil	44,202	5.63%
Sri Lankan Moors	50,419	6.42%
Burger	191	0.02%
other	1,139	0.14%
Total	785,524	100.00%

=== Religious groups (2011 census) ===
Religion in Kegalle district (2024)
Religion	Percent
Buddhism	83.74%
Islam	8.34%
Hinduism	6.46%
Catholicism	0.84%
Other Christianity	0.62%

Religious group	Population	%
Buddhist	707,830	84.7%
Islam	60,575	7.24%
Hindu	53,997	6.45%
Roman Catholic	8,221	0.98%
protestant	5,865	0.7%
other	115	0.02%
Total	836,603	100.00%

== Land usage ==
Crops	Quantity( Hec.)
Rice	23,516
Tea	18,673
Coconut	27,192
Rubber	89,311

== Notable places ==
=== Elephant Orphanage of Pinnawala ===
Pinnawela Elephant Orphanage of Pinnawala attracts thousands of tourists daily.
