= List of Archaeological Protected Monuments in Galle District =

This is a list of Archaeological Protected Monuments in Galle District, Sri Lanka.

Monument	Image	Location	Grama Niladhari Division	Divisional Secretary's Division	Registered	Description	Refs
Alagoda Walawwa		Unanvitiya	Waduwalivitiya South	Agaliya	23 February 2007	Chetiya	
Ambarukkharama Maha Vihara			No. 20-A - Pathagangoda	Balapitiya	6 June 2008	Buddha shrine, Bhikku dwelling and Dagoba with Vatadhageya within the precincts	
Ampitiya Devalaya			No. 204, Thelikada	Baddegama	22 October 2010	Stone pillars belonging to the Angpitiya Devala premises	
Atadage Walawwa		Kataluwa	Kataluwa-East	Habaraduwa	6 July 2007	Kathauwa Atadage Walawwa and Boundary Wall	
Atapattu Walawwa		Galle city		Galle	13 December 1998	At Walawwatta land	
Cathedral of the Mother of Rosary		Kaluwella	No. 96C, Kaluwella	Galle	15 April 2016	Cathedral the place called Mount Calvary	
Deeparama Vihara		Godagedara	Pathegama	Balapitiya	6 June 2008	Bhikku dwelling and the dagoba within the precincts	
Devagiri Vihara			No. 144 A Koggala	Habaraduwa	30 December 2011	Image House with Devalaya	
Dope Ganekanda Vihara			No. 5 - Dope	Bentota	6 June 2008	Buddha shrine	
Galapatha Raja Maha Vihara			Kagalla	Bentota	6 June 2008	Buddha shrine and dagoba within the precincts of the vihara	
Galle Fort		Galle city		Galle	1974		
Galle Prison			No. 96G, China Fort	Galle	22 July 2011	The office complex belonging to the land in which the Galle Prison is situated, and the old tunnel towards. The surrounding wall and the fort rampart	
Galwadugoda Purana Vihara		Galle city		Galle	8 July 2005	The Preching hall, image house and the stupa	
Ganegoda Raja Maha Vihara, Elpitiya			No. 25 Central Elpitiya	Elpitiya	6 July 2007	Image house, bana preaching hall, dagoda, pond and the pillar inscription	
Ganegodella Purana Vihara, Kosgoda			Nape	Bentota	5 April 1974	Image house	
Ganegodella Rajamaha Vihara			No. 17, Nape	Balapitiya	12 June 2015	The area belonging to Ganegodella Rajamaha Vihara, where archaeological remains including shrine, Chaitya, footprint of Buddha, Moonstone statue of Buddha and tombstone are scattered	
Ihalagoda Siri Vijeyarama Vihara			No. 31, Amugoda	Elpitiya	22 October 2010	Image house with paintings	
Ihala Walpola Sri Gawthamaramaya Purana Vihara			Walpola (GND No. 181)	Yakkalamulla	17 May 2013	Image house and chaithya	
Jananandanarama Vihara			No. 59-B-Hikkaduwa	Hikkaduwa	6 June 2008	Buddha shrine within the precincts	
Jayasingharama Purana Vihara			No. 216, Nagoda	Nagoda	22 October 2010	The Dharmasala (Preaching Hall)	
Kataluwa Walawwa		Kataluwa		Habaraduwa	7 December 2001	At Atadagewatta land	
Kosgoda Ganegodella Purana Vihara			No. 17 - Naape	Balapitiya	6 June 2008	Buddha shrine and two Bhikku dwellings within the precincts	
Kshetrarama Purana Vihara, Weragoda			Weragoda	Hikkaduwa	6 June 2008	Buddha shrine within the precincts	
Kshetrarama Purana Vihara, Middharamulla		Middharamulla	No. 18-A-Ahungalla	Balapitiya	6 June 2008	Bhikku shrine and Dagoba with the Vatadhageya and the Vishnu temple within the precincts	
Kuligoda Vanavasa Purana vihara			No. 77-A-Andurangoda	Hikkaduwa	6 June 2008	Buddha shrine	
Kumarakanda Purana Vihara		Kumarakanda		Hikkaduwa	13 December 1974	Image house	
Mabotunna Vihara		Mabotunna		Baddegama	12 March 1954	Image house	
Maduwa Sudharamarama Purana Vihara			No. 23 - Madhuwa	Balapitiya	6 June 2008	Buddha shrine and Dagoba with the Vatadageya within the precincts	
Magistrate's Court, Galle		Galle fort	No. 96D, Galle Fort	Galle	22 July 2011	Magistrate's Court and office building in Leyn Baan Street, Galle Fort	
Mahagoda Tapodhanarama Vihara			No. 91-A-Karandeniya South	Karandeniya	6 June 2008	Buddha shrine	
Mahakappitha Walawwa		Welitara		Balapitiya	18 October 1996		
Medakeembiya Sri Kshetrarama Purana Vihara			Medakeembiya East	Baddegama	24 July 2009	The Chamber House with paintings and sculptures in the Image house	
Meepe Ambalama			No. 151/A, Meepe	Habaraduwa	22 July 2011	The old Ambalama constructed on the Waguressa rock in the Meepe paddy fields	
Panangala Gangarama Vihara			Panangala	Thawalama	22 October 2010	Image house, with paintings and sculptures	
Randhombe Sangaraja Vihara			Randhombe south	Balapitiya	6 June 2008	Buddha shrine, bell tower, Dagoba, and Buddha foot imprint on stone within the precincts	
Rathpath Rajamaha Vihara		Thelwaththa	No. 67, Thelwaththa	Hikkaduwa	12 June 2015	Two Shrines, Chaitya, Chapter house, monk residences, preaching hall, retaining wall around Bo tree, Devala buildings, place of ruins with stone pillars, place of ruins with stone pillars by west at the premises of Vihara and premises of Vihara where other archaeological evidences are scattered	
Richmond Hill Methodist Church, Galle		Richmond Hill	Richmond Hill	Galle	17 May 2013		
Edward's Pillar	Bonavista	No. 137B	Habaraduwa	6 July 2007			
Seenigama Devalaya			Weragoda	Hikkaduwa	6 June 2008	Stone pillar Mandapa	
Shailavarama Purana Raja Maha Vihara		Pahala kimbiya	No 208, Pahala kimbiya	Baddegama	15 April 2016	Drip ledged cave	
Siripawara Bodhirajarama Vihara		Kokduwa	Galwehera	Balapitiya	6 June 2008	Dhamma Discourse hall and the Bhikku dwelling within the precincts	
Sri Piyarathana Vidyalaya			Dodanduwa, Degalla	Hikkaduwa	18 August 2006	The Old building in school premises	
Sri Pushparama Vihara, Balapitiya			Welitara	Balapitiya	6 June 2008	Buddha shrine, with the Dhamma discourse hall within the precincts	
Sri Sangharaja Indurugirilen Vihara			No. 94, Ambana	Elpitiya	23 January 2009	The drip ledged rock Vihara	
Sri Shylakutharama Purana Vihara		Gonapinuwala	Waulagala	Baddegama	6 July 2007	Cave temple with dripledges and dagoba	
Sri Sudharashanarama Purana Vihara		Boosa		Hikkaduwa	8 July 2005	Preching hall, image house and stupa	
Sri Sudharmarama Purana Vihara, Balapitiya		Balapitiya		Balapitiya	14 December 1945		
Sri Sumanarama Vihara		Talgahahena		Galle	7 December 2001	Image house	
Sri Vijaya Sundararama Purana Vihara		Ampavila	No. 561 D Ampavila	Imaduwa	30 December 2011	Image house	
Subadrarama Purana Vihara, Balapitiya			No. 309 Mohottiwatte	Balapitiya	6 June 2008	Buddha shrine and Dagoba within the precincts	
Sunandarama Maha Vihara, Ambalangoda		Ambalangoda	Paniyanduwa (GND No. 84A)	Ambalangoda	17 May 2013	Two image houses, stupa, preaching hall (Darma Shalawa) and well in the territory	
Sunandarama Purana Vihara, Karapitiya		Karapitiya		Galle	14 March 1975	Image house and Paintings	
Tankiyawaththa stone pond		Bataduwa	Bataduwa West	Akmeemana	25 March 2016	Stone pond situated in the land called tankiyawaththa alias Porambawaththa	
Telikada Sri Sunandarama Purana Vihara			No. 204, Thelikada	Baddegama	22 October 2010	Image house, with paintings and sculptures	
The house bearing Assessment No. 106		Kaluwella	Mahamodara	Galle	23 February 2007		
Thotagamu Rathapath Raja Maha Vihara		Telwatta		Hikkaduwa	13 March 1970	The Natha Devalaya	
Thuwakkugalawatta Purana Vihara			No. 97A, Weliwatta	Galle	30 December 2011	Image House	
Udugalpitiya Devol Devalaya		Dodanduwa	Udugalpitiya (GND No. 51A)	Hikkaduwa	17 May 2013		
Udumalagala Sri Gangarama Purana Vihara			Yakkalamulla-East	Yakkalamulla	23 February 2007	Chetiya	
Urawaththa Gangarama Vihara		Urawaththa	No. 80, Urawaththa	Hikkaduwa	15 April 2016	Chaitya in the premises	
Vaduwelivitiya Gangarama Vihara		No. 196, Vaduwelivitiya		Welivitiya-Divithura	22 October 2010	Image house, with paintings and sculptures and stupa	
Welikanda Shri Sudharshanarama Vihara			Ahungalla	Balapitiya	6 June 2008	The Bhikku dwelling, gateway and dagoba within the precincts	
Wijeyananda Piriven Vihara		Weliwatta		Galle	7 December 2001	Image house	
Yathramulla Vanavasa Raja Maha vihara				Bentara	6 June 2008	Buddha shrine	
