= Kahawennagama Grama Niladhari Division =

Kahawennagama
- Grama Niladhari Division
- Interactive map of Kahawennagama
- Coordinates: 5.998883°N 80.288539°E
- Country: Sri Lanka
- Province: Southern Province
- District: Galle District
- Divisional Secretariat: Habaraduwa Divisional Secretariat
- Electoral District: Galle Electoral District
- Polling Division: Habaraduwa Polling Division

Area
  - Total: 0.2 km^{2} (0.077 sq mi)
- Elevation: 13 m (43 ft)

Population (2012)
  - Total: 1,240
  - Density: 6,200/km^{2} (16,000/sq mi)
- ISO 3166 code: LK-3154080

Kahawennagama

Kahawennagama Grama Niladhari Division is a Grama Niladhari Division of the Habaraduwa Divisional Secretariat of Galle District of Southern Province, Sri Lanka . It has Grama Niladhari Division Code 148C.

Habaraduwa West are located within, nearby or associated with Kahawennagama.

Kahawennagama is a surrounded by the Attaragoda, Morampitigoda, Pitidoowa and Thalpe East Grama Niladhari Divisions.

== Demographics ==
=== Ethnicity ===
The Kahawennagama Grama Niladhari Division has a Sinhalese majority (100.0%) . In comparison, the Habaraduwa Divisional Secretariat (which contains the Kahawennagama Grama Niladhari Division) has a Sinhalese majority (99.7%)

Ethnicity in Kahawennagama
1. Sinhalese (100.0%)
2. Other (0.00%)

=== Religion ===
The Kahawennagama Grama Niladhari Division has a Buddhist majority (99.9%) . In comparison, the Habaraduwa Divisional Secretariat (which contains the Kahawennagama Grama Niladhari Division) has a Buddhist majority (99.1%)

Religion in Kahawennagama
1. Buddhist (99.9%)
2. Other (0.10%)
