= Balapitiya Grama Niladhari Division =

Balapitiya
- Grama Niladhari Division
- Interactive map of Balapitiya
- Coordinates: 6.270076°N 80.037719°E
- Country: Sri Lanka
- Province: Southern Province
- District: Galle District
- Divisional Secretariat: Balapitiya Divisional Secretariat
- Electoral District: Galle Electoral District
- Polling Division: Balapitiya Polling Division

Area
  - Total: 0.74 km^{2} (0.29 sq mi)
- Elevation: 48 m (157 ft)

Population (2012)
  - Total: 1,855
  - Density: 2,507/km^{2} (6,490/sq mi)
- ISO 3166 code: LK-3106185

Balapitiya

Balapitiya Grama Niladhari Division is a Grama Niladhari Division of the Balapitiya Divisional Secretariat of Galle District of Southern Province, Sri Lanka. It has Grama Niladhari Division Code 89.

Madu Ganga and Balapitiya are located within, nearby or associated with Balapitiya.

Balapitiya is a surrounded by the Berathuduwa, Brahmanawatta South and Elathota Grama Niladhari Divisions.

== Demographics ==
=== Ethnicity ===
The Balapitiya Grama Niladhari Division has a Sinhalese majority (99.6%). In comparison, the Balapitiya Divisional Secretariat (which contains the Balapitiya Grama Niladhari Division) has a Sinhalese majority (98.1%)

Ethnicity in Balapitiya
1. Sinhalese (99.6%)
2. Other (0.40%)

=== Religion ===
The Balapitiya Grama Niladhari Division has a Buddhist majority (99.1%). In comparison, the Balapitiya Divisional Secretariat (which contains the Balapitiya Grama Niladhari Division) has a Buddhist majority (97.9%)

Religion in Balapitiya
1. Buddhist (99.1%)
2. Other (0.90%)
