= Thunduwa East Grama Niladhari Division =

Thunduwa East
- Grama Niladhari Division
- Interactive map of Thunduwa East
- Coordinates: 6.410732°N 80.052423°E
- Country: Sri Lanka
- Province: Southern Province
- District: Galle District
- Divisional Secretariat: Bentota Divisional Secretariat
- Electoral District: Galle Electoral District
- Polling Division: Bentara Elpitiya Polling Division

Area
  - Total: 0.15 km^{2} (0.058 sq mi)
- Elevation: 56 m (184 ft)

Population (2012)
  - Total: 887
  - Density: 5,913/km^{2} (15,310/sq mi)
- ISO 3166 code: LK-3103095

Thunduwa East

Thunduwa East Grama Niladhari Division is a Grama Niladhari Division of the Bentota Divisional Secretariat of Galle District of Southern Province, Sri Lanka. It has Grama Niladhari Division Code 12B.

Thunduwa East is a surrounded by the Meegama, Haburugala, Thunduwa West and Ladduwa Grama Niladhari Divisions.

== Demographics ==
=== Ethnicity ===
The Thunduwa East Grama Niladhari Division has a Moor majority (94.8%). In comparison, the Bentota Divisional Secretariat (which contains the Thunduwa East Grama Niladhari Division) has a Sinhalese majority (97.3%)

Ethnicity in Thunduwa East
1. Moor (94.8%)
2. Sinhalese (3.40%)
3. Other (1.80%)

=== Religion ===
The Thunduwa East Grama Niladhari Division has a Muslim majority (96.3%). In comparison, the Bentota Divisional Secretariat (which contains the Thunduwa East Grama Niladhari Division) has a Buddhist majority (97.1%)

Religion in Thunduwa East
1. Muslim (96.3%)
2. Buddhist (3.00%)
3. Other (0.70%)
