= Kodagoda East Grama Niladhari Division =

Kodagoda East
- Grama Niladhari Division
- Interactive map of Kodagoda East
- Coordinates: 6.026903°N 80.408230°E
- Country: Sri Lanka
- Province: Southern Province
- District: Galle District
- Divisional Secretariat: Imaduwa Divisional Secretariat
- Electoral District: Galle Electoral District
- Polling Division: Habaraduwa Polling Division

Area
  - Total: 1.93 km^{2} (0.75 sq mi)
- Elevation: 339 m (1,112 ft)

Population (2012)
  - Total: 1,221
  - Density: 633/km^{2} (1,640/sq mi)
- ISO 3166 code: LK-3151180

Kodagoda East

Kodagoda East Grama Niladhari Division is a Grama Niladhari Division of the Imaduwa Divisional Secretariat of Galle District and the Southern Province, Sri Lanka. It has Grama Niladhari Division Code 171A.

Kodagoda East is surrounded by the Horadugoda, Nalawana, Kodagoda South, Hettigoda and Wahala Kananke South of the Grama Niladhari Divisions.

== Demographics ==
=== Ethnicity ===
The Kodagoda East Grama Niladhari Division has a Sinhalese majority (100.0%). In comparison, the Imaduwa Divisional Secretariat (which contains the Kodagoda East Grama Niladhari Division) has a Sinhalese majority (99.8%)

Ethnicity in Kodagoda East
1. Sinhalese (100.0%)
2. Other (0.00%)

=== Religion ===
The Kodagoda East Grama Niladhari Division has a Buddhist majority (99.9%). In comparison, the Imaduwa Divisional Secretariat (which contains the Kodagoda East Grama Niladhari Division) has a Buddhist majority (99.5%)

Religion in Kodagoda East
1. Buddhist (99.9%)
2. Other (0.10%)
