= Panangala West Grama Niladhari Division =

Panangala West
- Grama Niladhari Division
- Interactive map of Panangala West
- Coordinates: 6.274768°N 80.312530°E
- Country: Sri Lanka
- Province: Southern Province
- District: Galle District
- Divisional Secretariat: Thawalama Divisional Secretariat
- Electoral District: Galle Electoral District
- Polling Division: Hiniduma Polling Division

Area
  - Total: 3.95 km^{2} (1.53 sq mi)
- Elevation: 135 m (443 ft)

Population (2012)
  - Total: 753
  - Density: 191/km^{2} (490/sq mi)
- ISO 3166 code: LK-3118105

Panangala West

Panangala West Grama Niladhari Division is a Grama Niladhari Division of the Thawalama Divisional Secretariat of Galle District of Southern Province, Sri Lanka. It has Grama Niladhari Division Code 225A.

Panangala West is a surrounded by the Marakanda, Eppala, Malhathawa, Panangala North and Panangala East Grama Niladhari Divisions.

== Demographics ==
=== Ethnicity ===
The Panangala West Grama Niladhari Division has a Sinhalese majority (99.5%). In comparison, the Thawalama Divisional Secretariat (which contains the Panangala West Grama Niladhari Division) has a Sinhalese majority (93.7%)

Ethnicity in Panangala West
1. Sinhalese (99.5%)
2. Other (0.50%)

=== Religion ===
The Panangala West Grama Niladhari Division has a Buddhist majority (99.1%). In comparison, the Thawalama Divisional Secretariat (which contains the Panangala West Grama Niladhari Division) has a Buddhist majority (93.0%)

Religion in Panangala West
1. Buddhist (99.1%)
2. Other (0.90%)
