= Nicholas Dias Abeysinghe =

Ceylonese Dutch colonial administrator

Nicholas Dias Abeysinghe Amarasekere
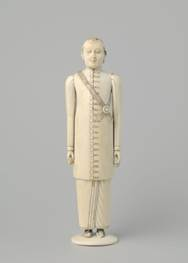
- Nicholas Dias Abeysinghe Amarasekere, Maha Mudaliyar of Dutch Ceylon
- Born: 8 May 1719; Galle, Ceylon
- Died: 10 May 1794 (aged 75); Ceylon
- Education: Dutch Reformed Church
- Occupation: Colonial Administrator
- Title: Head Mudaliyar
- Spouses: Lady Dona Clara Goonaratne; Lady Adriana Gertruda Ilangakoon
- Children: Don Balthazar; Johannes Welhelmus; Abraham; Dona Ana Hertroyda

Nicholas Dias Abeysinghe Amarasekere Maha Mudaliyar, (Sinhala: නිකලස් ඩයස් අබේසිංහ අමරසේකර) (8 May 1719 - 10 May 1794) was a Ceylonese Dutch colonial administrator. He was appointed as the Maha Mudaliyar (Head Mudaliyar) of Dutch Ceylon, hence he was one of the most powerful personalities in the country.

He received Mudaliyar medal from Governor Jan Schreuder in 1768 and later received the Head Mudaliyar Gold medal on 31 May 1785 from Governor Willem Jacob van de Graaf, as a recognition and reward for his fidelity towards the Dutch East India company. A Mala Padakkama is also said to have been conferred on him by the Kandyan King of the era.

== Family and residences ==
Nicholas Dias Abeysinghe was born in 1719 to the family of Mohandiram Don Joan Dias Abeysinghe and Dona Gimara de Silva of Galle. He was married to Dona Clara Goonaratne, daughter of Domingu Jayathileke Goonaratne, Mohandiram Atapattu of Galle and to Adriana Gertruda Ilangakoon, daughter of Ilangakoon Mudaliyar.

He had a son and a daughter from his first marriage with Clara Goonaratne; Don Balthazar, who was a Sahabndar Maha Mudaliyar and Dona Ana Hertroyda, who was married to Don Bastian Jayathilleke Gooneratne, Attapattu Mudaliyar of Galle.

He had two sons from his marriage to Adriana Gertruda Ilangakoon; Johannes Welhelmus, who was the Mohandiram of Galle and Abraham, a Guard Mudaliyar and the chief interpreter of Sir Robert Brownrigg, the Governor of British Ceylon.

Nicholas Dias Abeysinghe lived at Pokune Walauwa in Dangedera, Galle. He had two other Walauwas located in Colombo and Katunayake. His Colombo walawwa was situated at Silver Smith Street and Katunayake walauwa was situated at Kotugoda.

== See also ==
- Govigama
- E. R. Gooneratne
