= Kodagoda =

Kodagoda (Sinhala: කෝදාගොඩ, romanized: Kōdāgoḍa) is a Sinhalese surname. Notable people with the surname include:

- Nandadasa Kodagoda (1929–1997), Sri Lankan medical doctor and academic
- Yasantha Kodagoda, Sri Lankan puisne justice of the Supreme Court since 2020

== See also ==
- Oziotelphusa kodagoda, Species of crab
- Kodagoda East Grama Niladhari Division, Administrative division in Sri Lanka
