= The Kandy House =

Kandy House

General information
- Location: Kandy, Sri Lanka

Other information
- Number of rooms: nine

Website
- Kandy House website

The Kandy House is a nine-room, 200-year-old manor house which was built by the last Chief Minister of the Kandyan Kingdom in 1804. It was fully restored and opened in 2005 as an upmarket boutique hotel, situated 20 minutes from Kandy. Described as a "showcase of the island's architectural renaissance", it has established a reputation as "the best small hotel in Sri Lanka".

== History ==
The Kandy Hotel is also known as "Amunugama Walauwa" or "Ratwatte Walauwa" was built in 1804 by the Chief Minister, Ratwatte Adigar, to the last King of Kandy. The kingdom at that time forbade any but the royal residences to use roofing tiles but the ambitious Ratwatte Adigar, had the nerve to build himself a replica palace with two sprawling stories of terracotta tiles. Two hundred years on, Geoffrey Bawa's protégé Channa Daswatte began work on a sensitive restoration that has kept the essence of the villa intact but brought it into the 21st century.

== Notable guests ==
- Madhur Jaffrey
- Gillian Anderson
- Prince Michael of Kent and Princess Michael of Kent
- Joanna Trollope

== Facilities ==
- Swimming Pool
- Inhouse dining facilities
- Yoga Lessons

== Awards ==
- Condé Nast Traveler Hot List 2006
