= Edmund Rowland Gooneratne =

Ceylonese British colonial-era administrator

Edmund Rowland Jayathilake Gooneratne
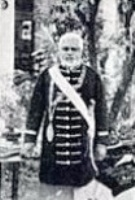
- Gate Mudaliyar E. R. Gooneratne
- Born: 6 May 1845; Galle, Ceylon
- Died: 7 August 1914 (aged 69); Galle, Ceylon
- Education: Galle High School; St. Thomas' College, Mutwal
- Occupations: Administrator, writer
- Title: Gate Mudaliyar
- Spouses: Matilda Ilangakoon; Corneliya Thilakaratne
- Children: Valantine Goonaratne; Mark Sigmund Goonaratne; Eva Tagora Goonaratne; Upali Gooneratne

Edmund Rowland Jayathilake Gooneratne, Gate Mudaliyar, JP, (Sinhala: එඩ්මන්ඩ් රෝලන්ඩ් ජයතිලක ගුණරත්න) was a Ceylonese British colonial-era administrator and a literary figure. He was also a scholar, intellectual, social worker, planter and a Buddhist revivalist. A resident of Atapattu Walawwa in Galle, E. R. Gooneratne served as the Atapattu Mudaliyar of Galle and as the Mudaliyar of the Governor’s Gate Later he was appointed as the acting Maha Mudaliyar. E. R. Gooneratne was the most influential native official of Southern Ceylon during the British colonial rule in the country.

== Life and career ==
Edmund Rowland Gooneratne was born on 6 May 1845, as the second son of the family of Mudaliyar David Jayathilake Goonaratne and Catharina Cecilia Dias Bandaranaike. His father was the Mohotti Mudaliyar of Galle. Young E. R. Gooneratne had his education at S. Thomas' College, Mutwal, shortly after the institution was founded by Bishop Chapman. He was a Christian by birth, but later converted to Buddhism and became a Buddhist nationalist.

In 1865 E. R. Gooneratne joined the government service as a translator at the Galle Kachcheri. Subsequently, he became Land registrar of Galle and the police magistrate of Balapitiya. In 1883 in recognition of his service the governor appointed him as the Mudaliyar of the Governor's Gate and a justice of peace in 1896. He retired from the government service in 1897, after an unbroken service of 32 years. E. R. Gunaratne also served as a member of the Government Board of Education.

He married Matilda Ilangakoon, a daughter of Mudaliyar J. V. Ilangakoon of Weligam korale in 1873. They had a son and a daughter. Their son Dr. Valantine David Goonaratne was the home Surgeon of the Galle Hospital. E. R. Gooneratne later married Corneliya Thilakaratne as his second spouse. They had a son, Mark Sigmund Goonaratne and a daughter, Eva Tagora Goonaratne.

In 1897, E. R. Gooneratne proceeded to England as one of the representatives of the Ceylonese government to participate in that year's Jubilee Celebrations. During this visit he was awarded the Queen Victoria Diamond Jubilee Medal. After visiting France, he returned to Ceylon and devoted his time for literature and planting. He owned several tea, coconut and cinnamon plantations in the Galle, Matara and Hambanthota districts. He was a friend of Hikkaduwe Sri Sumangala Thera, Rhys Davids, Maharaja Jyotindra Mohun Tagore, Ananda Coomaraswamy, Henry Steele Olcott and F. L. Woodward. E. R. Gooneratne died in 1914 at the age of 69.

== Social and religious services ==
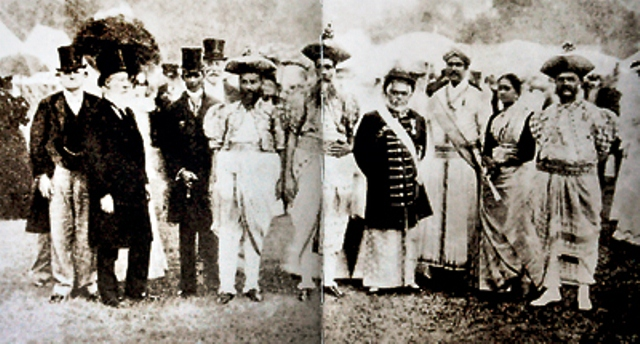
E. R. Gooneratne representing Ceylon at the Diamond Jubilee of Queen Victoria (4th from right)

E. R. Gooneratne sponsored education to both locals and foreigners and gave leadership to the revival of civilian and Buddhist education of the country. He was a co-founder of Bataduwe Ratanajothi Vidyalaya. He also started one of the first Pirivenas in the south in around the 1880s at the Gooneratne Mudalindaramaya in Matara. He is also the founder of Simbali Avasaya in Galle, now known as Gooneratne Mudalindaramaya.

A trustee of the Mahabodhi, he actively took part in the Buddhist revival and the social reform group of Ceylon in the 1890s. He repaired and reconstructed the Buddhuge (Shrine hall) and the Buddha Statue in Sri Maha Bodhi in Anuradhapura. He also took part in the restoration work of Dambulla cave temple and sponsored the reconstruction work of Buddha statues there. Mudaliyar Gooneratne played a major role in the post Olcott Buddhist revival and his efforts made Galle, a leading centre of Buddhist learning in Ceylon. He did a great service for the Buddhist, educational and social revival of Ceylon.

== Literary works ==
A committed editor and translator of Pali texts, E. R. Gooneratne wrote commentaries on classical Sri Lankan literary works such as Rasavahini, Sariputta and Rupamala. He was the secretary of the Pali Text Society for Ceylon. He also served in the editorial Board of the magazine Serendipity, a successor to the abandoned magazine the Orientalis. Gooneratne was also a diarist par excellence. Some of his literary works are;

- The Dhatu Katha Pakarana: And Its Commentary (1892)
- Translation of Anguttara Nikaya to English
- The Vimanavatthu
- Dhatukatha with Commentary
- Telakatahagatha

== See also ==
- Nicholas Dias Abeysinghe
