= Rajamanthri Walauwa =

Rajamanthri Walauwa (රාජමන්ත්‍රී වලව්ව) or manor house of Rajamanthri is situated in Karandagolla, Hanguranketha, Sri Lanka. Rajamanthri Walauwa is an eight-room, 200-year-old mansion built by the last Chief Minister of the Kingdom of Kandy in 1804. It was fully restored in 1944. During the early 1970s, Prince Gamini Rajamanthri and Prince Samantha Rajamanthri became the new inhabitants of the Rajamanthri Walauwa. To this day, the manor house is managed by Prince Julius' sons.

== History ==
This villa was built in 1804 by the Chief Minister to the last King of Kandy. The kingdom at that time forbade the use of roofing tile to anyone who wasn't royalty. Despite this ban, Chief Minister Rajamanthri built a replica palace with two sprawling stories of terracotta tiles for himself. Two hundred years later, Geoffrey Bawa's protégé, Chief Minister Julius Rajamanthri from Govi Gama Radala caste, began a delicate restoration work that retained the essence of the villa. The estate is a major producer of coconuts, rubber, pepper, cardamom, ginger, cocoa, areca nut, coffee, nutmeg, cinnamon, cloves, vanilla, orchids and teak.

== Meaning of walauwa ==
In Sinhala, walauwa means mansion. The English terms for walauwa are "manor" or "manor house", a large house with larger lands. The walauwa and its owners were supported by the larger lands and estates they possessed. These either were land grants from kings since the beginning of the Sinhalese kingdom until the Kandyan era or government service during the Colonial era, or were acquired by a successful enterprise and passed down through generations. The owners were the landed elites of Ceylon; as such they gained a status of power and wealth.

There is another theory that walauwa means a place of judgement. Those people who occupied the walauwa had the authority to pass judgement over people with the authority provided by Royal Decree. Mansions replaced the walauwa in the urban areas towards the latter part of the nineteenth century.

== See also ==
- History of Sri Lanka
- Kandyan Convention
- Walauwa
- Sri Lankan caste system
- Sri Lankan honours system
