= The Manor House, Kandy =

The Mansion (BeragamaWalawwa)

General information
- Location: Kandy, Sri Lanka, 213, Aladeniya, Nugawela
- Opening: 2006

Technical details
- Floor count: two
- Floor area: 1,300 m^{2} (14,000 sq ft)

Other information
- Number of rooms: ten
- Number of suites: two

Website
- The Manor House official website

The Manor House is a boutique hotel in Sri Lanka, located in Aladeniya, about 8 kilometres (5.0 mi) from Kandy.

The original building, known as the Nugawela Aluth Walauwa, was constructed in 1884 by K. Nugawela. The current building was constructed in 1924 by Punchi Banda Nugawela, Diyawadana Nilame of Temple of the Tooth, Kandy, Sri Lanka. He was responsible for designing and building the present Preaching Hall and Museum at the Kandy Maligawa. The old Walauwa was demolished in 1952. Mahatma Gandhi stayed in the house in November 1928 and Gregory Peck, resided here whilst filming The Purple Plain in 1955.

In 1950 Colonel Derrick Nugawela sold it to M.P.S. Marawanagoda. His son, Ratnapala Marawanagoda, decided to convert the Walauwa into a hotel in 1998, as Hotel Mansion Nugwela.

In July 2004 it was purchased by the de Silva family who restored the building and converted into a boutique hotel.
