= Galle Divisional Secretariat =

- Divisional Secretariat
- Interactive map of Galle Divisional Secretariat
- Country: Sri Lanka
- Province: Southern Province
- District: Galle District
- Time zone: UTC+5:30 (Sri Lanka Standard Time)

Galle Divisional Secretariat is a Divisional Secretariat of Galle District, of Southern Province, Sri Lanka.

== Demography ==
Religion in Galle DS Division (2012)
1. Buddhist (65.7%)
2. Hindu (0.70%)
3. Muslim (32.3%)
4. Roman Catholic (0.90%)
5. Other Christian (0.40%)
6. Other (0.00%)
