= Walauwa =

Term for a manor house in Sri Lanka

Regions with significant populations
- Sri Lanka

Languages
- Sinhala language

Religion
- Predominantly: Theravada Buddhism

Related ethnic groups
- Sinhalese people, South Asian ethnic groups

A walauwa or walawwa is a feudal/colonial manor house in Sri Lanka of a native headman. It also refers to the feudal social systems that existed during the colonial era.

The term walauwa is derived from the Tamil word valavu, which denotes a compound or garden, and by implication, a large house with aristocratic connotations. The pinnacle of walauwas in the Sinhala social stratum is the wasala walauwa. Wasala is derived from the word Wasasathana, meaning residence. In the Sinhalese social hierarchy, a wasala walawa would typically be the ancestral residence of a mudaliyar.

Walauwas vary in style, elegance and uniqueness depending upon the financial resources of the individual families and in the village or area's social structure. Most walauwas tend to incorporate aspects of traditional pre-colonial Ceylonese architecture, as well as Dutch and later colonial influences. A walauwa usually consisted of a cluster of buildings linked by verandahs, with an internal courtyard (medamidula), which separated the private life of the family from the headman's public duties.

The walauwa were traditionally associated with the homes of the courtiers (radala), members of the royal court in Kandy. It was displaced by their colonial equivalents following the dissolution of the Kingdom of Kandy by the British.

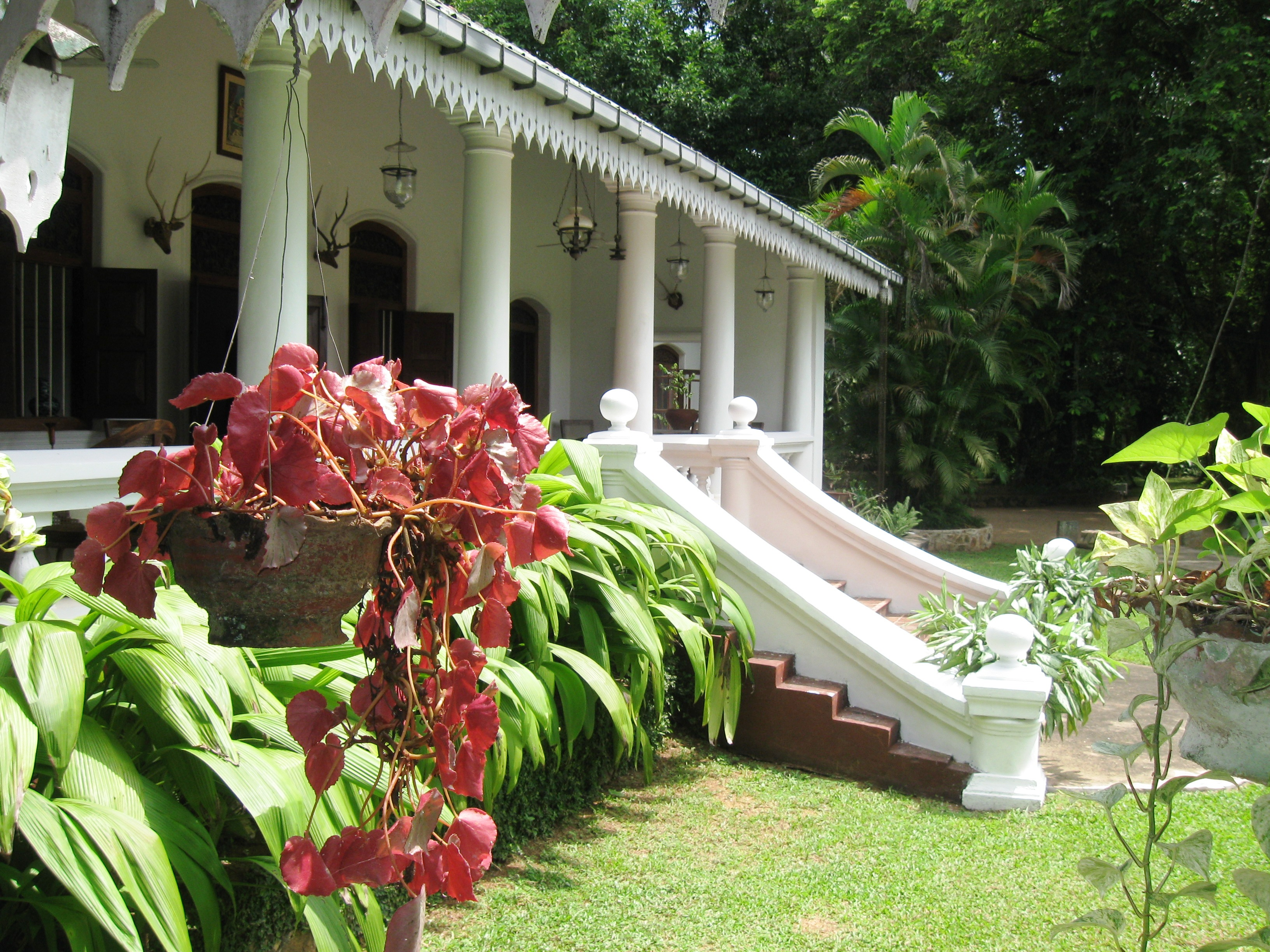
Meeduma Walauwa of the Tennakoon Family, Rambukkana

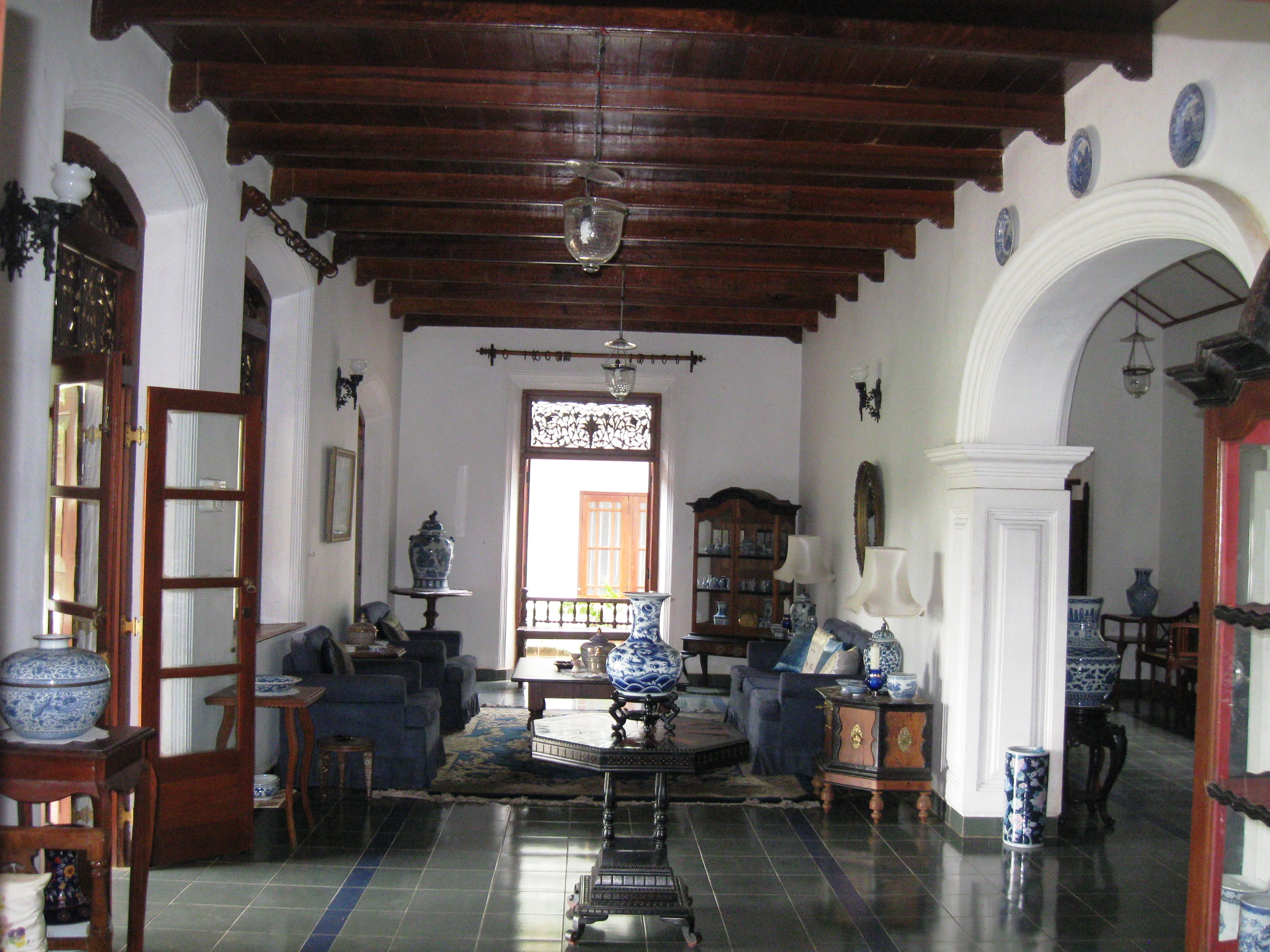
Sitting room of Meeduma Walauwa, Rambukkana, Sri Lanka

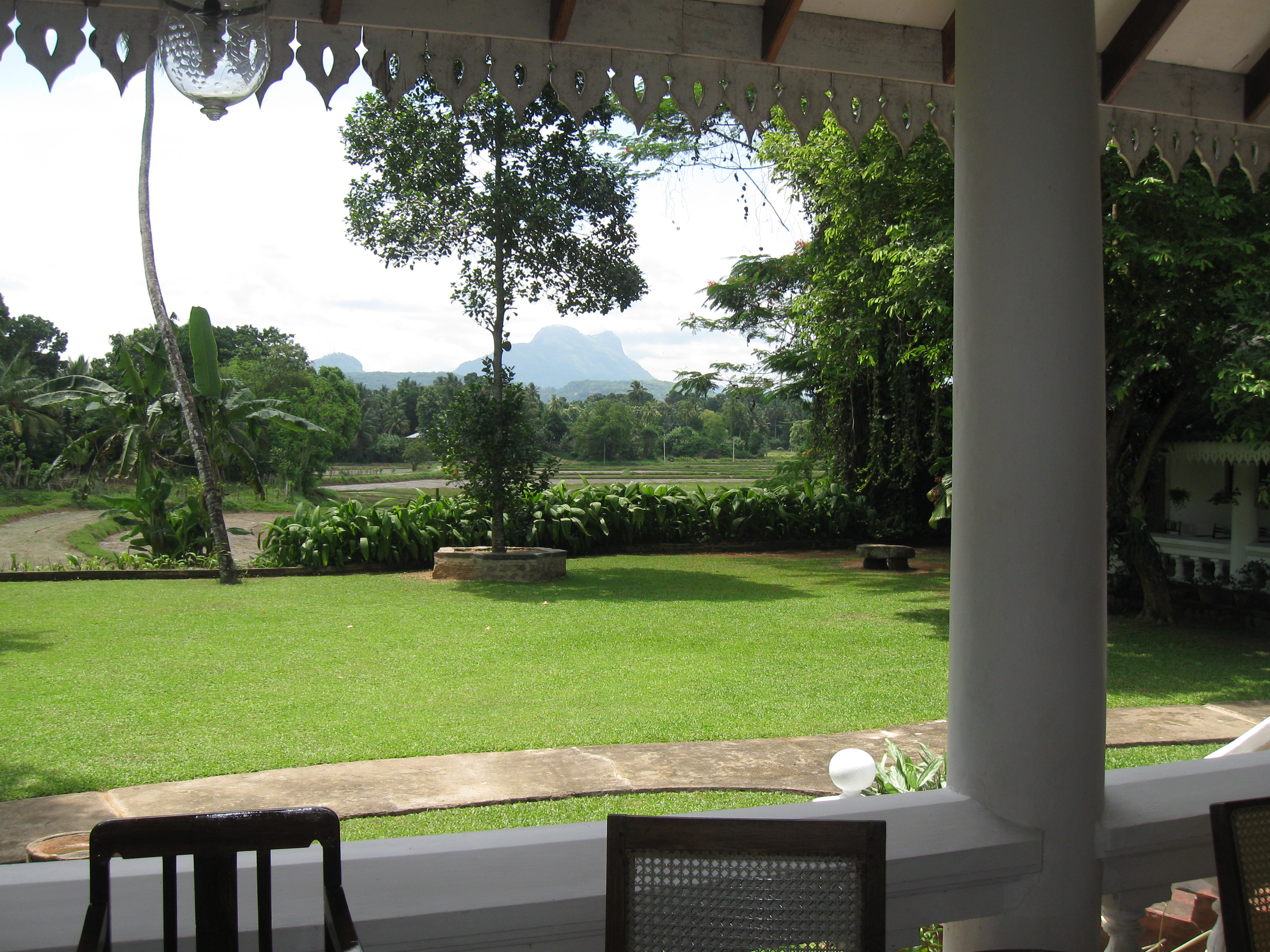
View from Meeduma Walauwa, Rambukkana

== Kandyan Walauwas ==
There were 18 main walauwas in the Kandyan Kingdom of Ceylon. These were (in alphabetical order):

- Arapola Walauwa (ඇරෑපොල වලව්ව) - demolished
- Arawwawala Walauwa (ඇරැව්වාවල වලව්ව)
- Dehigama Walauwa (දෙහිගම වලව්ව) - demolished (Central Finance Building)
- Dullewe Walauwa (දුල්ලෑව වලව්ව) - part of Queen's Hotel
- Dunuwila Walauwa (දුනුවිල වලව්ව) - currently Kandy Town Hall
- Ehelepola Walauwa (ඇහැලේපොල වලව්ව) - fmr Bogambara Remand Centre
- Ellepola Walauwa (ඇල්ලේපොල වලව්ව)
- Eramuduliyadde Walawwa (එරමුදුලියද්දේ වලව්ව)
- Kapuwatte Walauwa (කපුවත්තෙ වලව්ව)
- Mampitiya Walauwa (මාම්පිටිය වලව්ව) - Royal Bar and Hotel
- Meegasthenna Walauwa (මීගස්තැන්න වලව්ව)
- Moladanda Walauwa (මොලදණ්ඩ වලව්ව)
- Molligoda Walauwa (මොල්ලිගොඩ වලව්ව) - demolished
- Mullegama Walauwa (මුල්ලේගම වලව්ව) - St. Sylvester’s college
- Nugawela Walauwa (නුගවෙල වලව්ව) - The Manor House
- Pilimathalawa Walauwa (පිළිමතලාව වලව්ව) - President's House
- Ratwatte Walauwa (රත්වත්තේ වලව්ව) - Chandra Silk House
- Wegodapola Walauwa (වෑගොඩපොල වලව්ව)

== Other Prominent Walauwas in Kandyan Kingdom ==
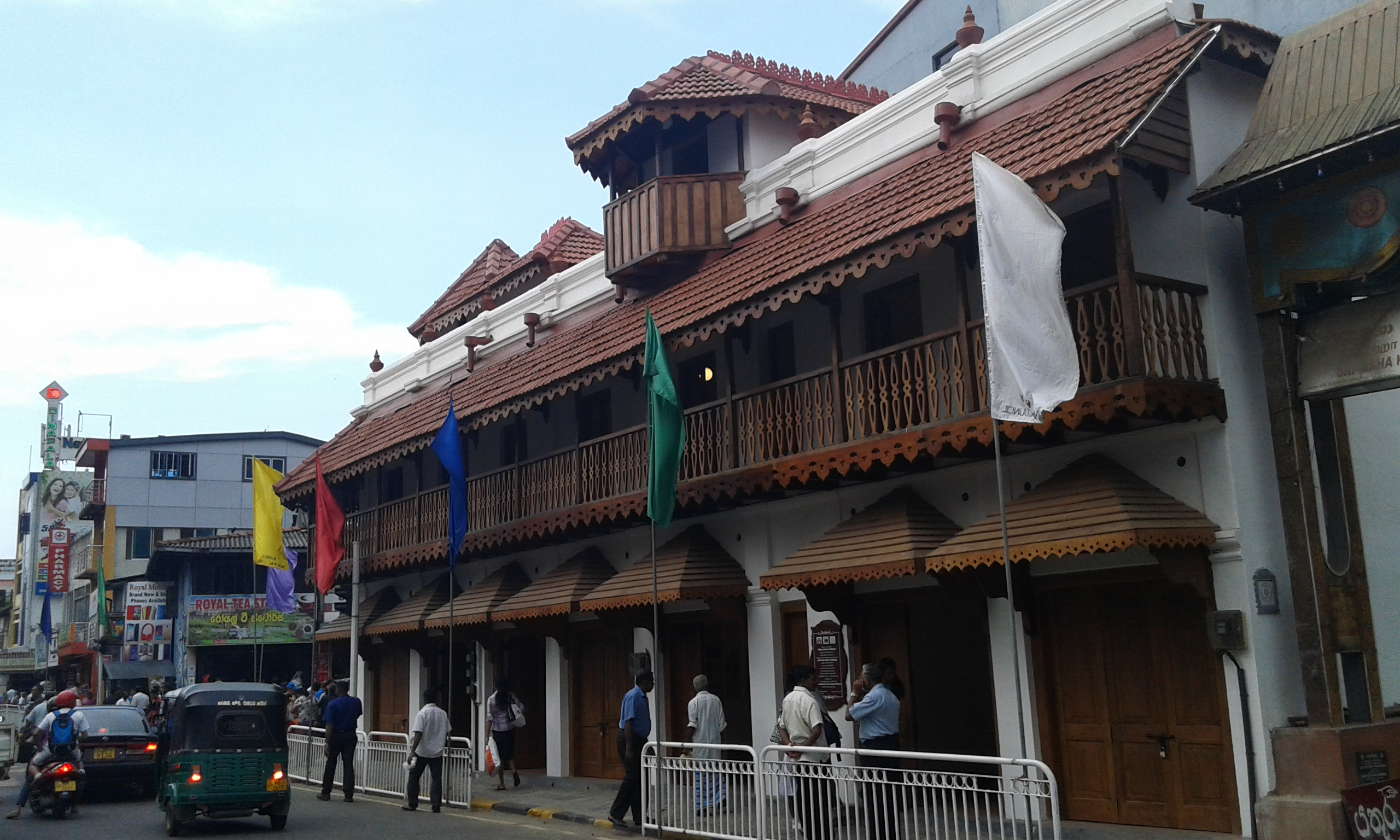
Giragama Walauwa, Kandy, Sri Lanka

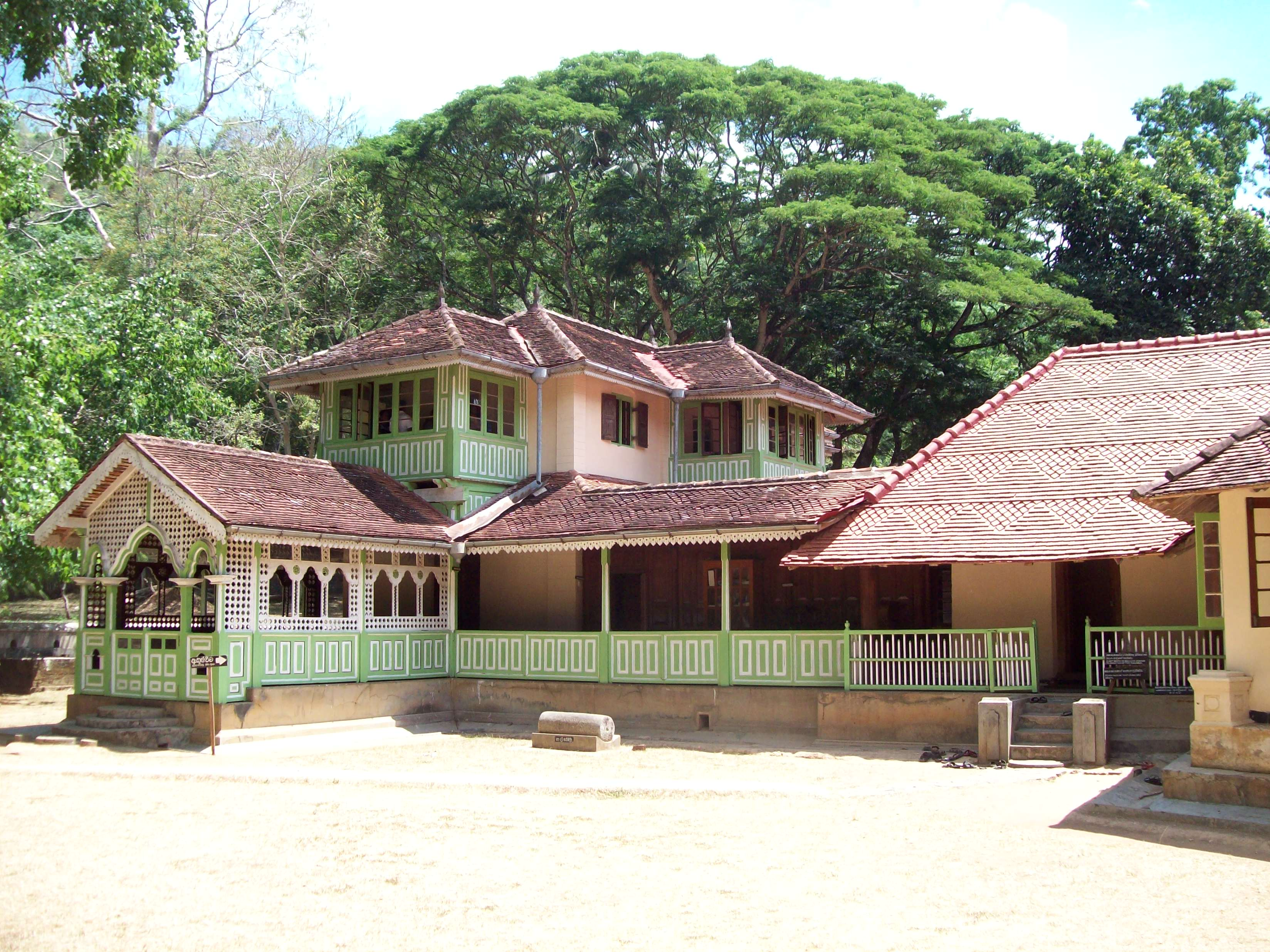
Maduwanwela Walauwa, Kolonne, Sri Lanka

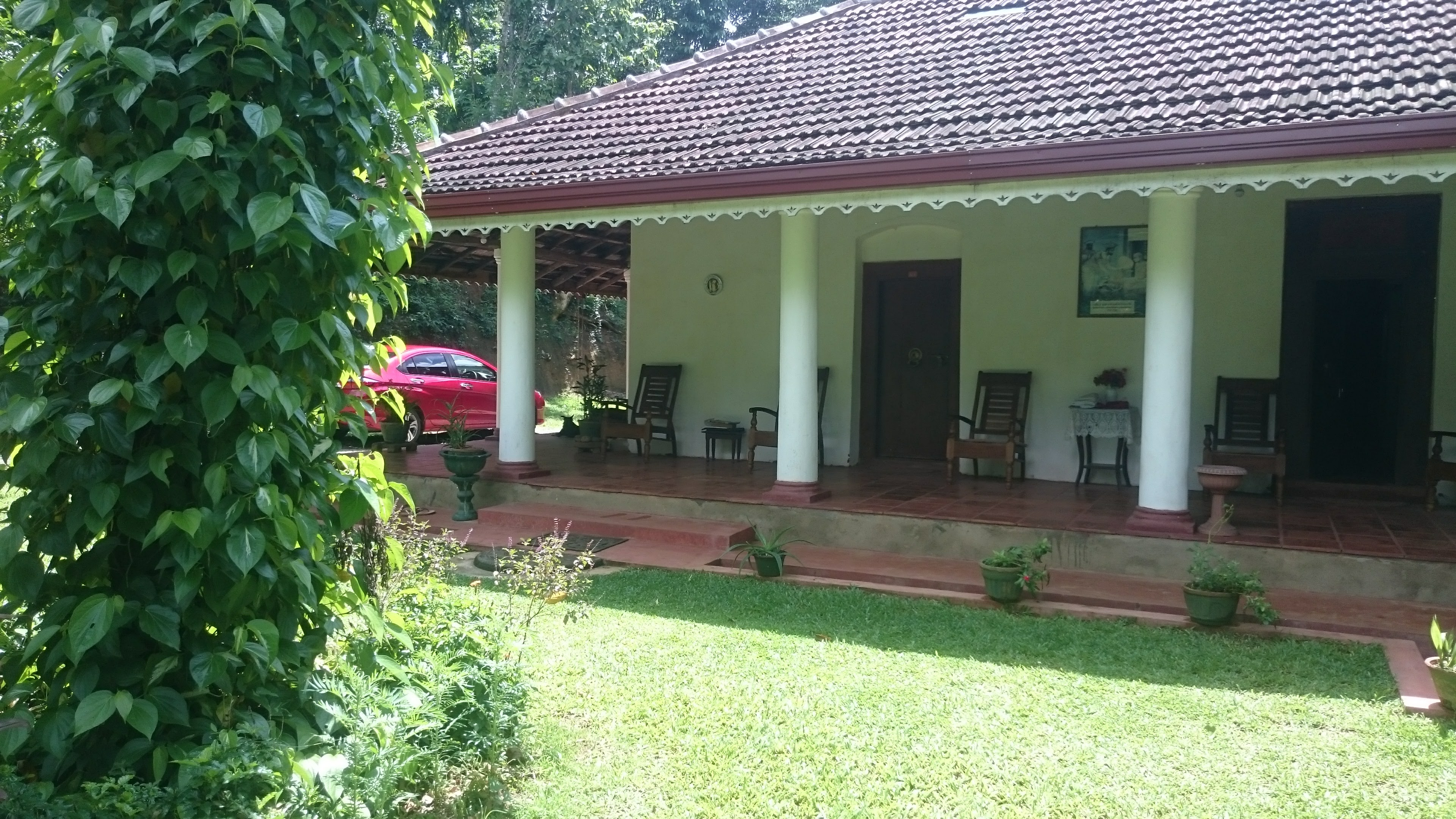
Welivita Waththe Walauwa, Tumpane, Sri Lanka

- Angunawela Walauwa, Peradeniya
- Deldeniya Walauwa, Yatinuwara
- Elapatha Walauwa, Rathnapura
- Maduwanwela Walawwa, Kolonne
- Mahawelatenne Walauwa, Balangoda
- Welivita waththe walauwa, Tumpane
- Paranagama walauwa, Paranagama, wettewa, Galagedara
- Ranwala Walauwa, Niyangoda
- Elapatha Walauwa, Rathnapura
- Amunugama Walauwa, Kobbekaduwa
- Thambagamuwa Walauwa, Ata Kalan Koralaya, Ratnapura
- Kobbekaduwa, medagedara walauwa

== Sathara Korale Walauwas (Kegalle District) ==
There were 30 main walauwas in the Sathara Korale of Ceylon according to the Sathara Korale Viththi Grantha. There were in alphabetical order;

- Aludeniya Walauwa
- Aluth Nuwara Walauwa
- Araupala Walauwa
- Asmadala Walauwa
- Arrachchi Walauwa
- Athurupana Walauwa
- Baminiwaththa Walauwa
- Dodamthale Walauwa
- Edanduwawa Walauwa
- Mapitigama Mahawaththa Walauwa, Meedeniya, Kegalle
- Halagiriya Walauwa
- Handagama Walauwa
- Harigala Walauwa
- Kadigamuwa Walauwa
- Kappagoda Walauwa
- Kempitiya Walauwa
- Keppetipola Walauwa
- Kotagama Walauwa
- Kumbal Oluwa Walauwa
- Kumbaldiwela Walauwa
- Leuke Walauwa
- Madana Walauwa
- Mahanthegama Walauwa
- Makadawara Meddewatte Walauwa
- Molligoda Walauwa
- Malpandeniya Walauwa (Sriwardene Walauwa)
- Nawa Uhangoda Walauwa
- Polgasdeniya Walauwa
- Rankothdiwela Walauwa
- Udaththavan Walauwa
- Valimanne Walauwa
- Walgama Walauwa
- Athurupane Walauwa Meepitiya Kegalle

== Sath Korale Walauwas (Kurunegala District) ==
- Kaudumunna walawwa (Belonged to a relative of Ehelepola Adigar)
- Bogollagama Walauwa
- Katupitiya Walauwa
- Gopallawa Walauwa
- Dangolle Walauwa, Boyagane
- Palipana Walauwa
- Balalla Walauwa
- Moragollagama Walauwa
- Rekawa Walauwa
- Ralapanawa Walauwa
- Moonemalle Walauwa
- Sirigala Walauwa
- Galabada Walauwa
- Dodamkumbura Walauwa
- Singhagiriya Walawa
- Welagedara Walauwa
- Weththewé Walauwa
- Gajamadaara Walauwa
- Peragasela Koralé Walauwa
- Galwarama Walauwa
- Mahagedara Walauwa
- Ihala Walauwa (boyawalana)
- Wele Walauwa (boyawalana)
- Boyawalana Walauwa
- Monnekulamé Walauwa
- Kalalpitiyé Walauwa
- Galgomuwé Walauwa
- Madhurawé Walauwa
- Rathmale Walauwa
- Wadigamangawa Walauwa
- Wewelwala Walauwa
- Godawita Walauwa
- Kadurugashena Tennakoon Walauwa
- Hunukumbure Walauwa
- Udugama Walauwa
- Athapaththuwe Walauwa
- Gajamadaara Walauwa
- Wedande Walauwa, Demataluwa

== Prominent Colombo Walauwas built in early 1800's ==
- Wasala Walauwa (Belonged to the Tillekeratne Abeyesekere family. Notable occupants were Gate Mudaliyars Don Johannes Tillekeratne Abeyesekere and his son John Abraham Tillekeratne Abeyesekere, Colombo Mudaliyar at the time of his death in 1911)
- Atapattu Walauwa, Kotahena (Belonged to Senewiratne Perera Wijegoonewardene. Notable occupant was Mudaliyar Henry Aloysius Senewiratne Perera Wijegoonewardena, Atapattu Muadaliya Colombo)
- Malwatte Walauwa, Grandpass (Belonged to Gomis Abeyasinghe Weerakoon family. Notable occupants were Mudaliyars Simon Gomis Abeyasinghe Weerakoon and his son Gerard Gomis Wijayesinghe Weerakoon, Basnayake Mudaliyar)

== Prominent Low-Country Walauwas ==
There have been a number of other prominent, well known walauwas in the southern areas of Ceylon, outside the Kandyan Kingdom. These walauwas comprised a mix of Sri Lankan, Portuguese, Dutch and English architecture.

- Amarasuriya Walauwa, Unawatuna
- Amerasinghe Walawwa, Habaraduwa
- Amerasinghe Waluwwa, Unawatuna
- Atapattu Walawwa, Galle
- Bagatale Walauwa, Colombo 3
- Bethme Walawwa, Wehalla
- Boralugoda Walawwa
- Bothale Walawwa, Mirigama
- Chevaliar Walauwa, Moratuwa
- Closenberg Walauwa, Galle
- Gandhara Walauwa
- Horagolla Walauwa, Atthanagalla
- Ihala Walauwa, Kotte
- Jayasinghe Walauwa, Ekala
- Kataluwa Atadahewatte, Obeyesekere Maha Walawwa
- Kalutara Maha Walauwa
- Kandawala Waluwa, Ratmalana
- Kotalawala Walawwa
- Maha Kappina Walauwa, Balapitiya
- Mahawelatenne Walauwa, Balangoda
- Mandiyagoda Rathnasinghe Walauwa, Beliatta
- Moratuwa Walauwa
- Matara Maha Walauwa
- Nakulugamuwa Walawwa, Beliatta
- Obeyesekere Walawa, Colombo 7
- Pahala Walauwa, Barrack Street, Hambantota
- Pattikara wasala walauwa, wadduwa
- Punchi Kachcheriya walauwa, Pothupitiya
- Ratnagiri Walawwa, Boralesgamuwa
- Regina Walauwa, Colombo 7
- Susew Walauwa Molligoda
- Udaha Walauwa, Galkissa
- Uda Waluwa, Barrack Street, Hambantota
- Wasala Walauwa, Panadura
- Wasala Walauwa, Terrace Street, Hambantota
- Wickramasuriya Walauwa, Kathaluwa

== Decline and current states ==
The word "Walauwa" may not have a Sinhalese origin, it is unclear whether it was a Sinhalese word from the beginning, but this word may have been adapted from the Tamil word "Walaw". In Sinhalese, it gives a plural sound rather than the singular word "Walaw" which means "Mansion". The typical Sinhala term is 'Maha Gedhara'. The English word of "Walauwa" is, "Manor" or "Manor-House", and it's a large house with lands. The Walauwas and its owners were supported by the larger lands and estates they possessed. These were either land grants from Kings (since the beginning of the Sinhalese Kingdom until the Kandyan era) or government service (during the Colonial era) or acquired by successful enterprise and passed down though generations. Their owners were the landed elites of Ceylon, as such they gained a status of power and wealth. A notable feature of many of these walauwas, especially Kandyan walauwas was an interior open space/garden known as the 'medamidula'. There is another theory about Walauwas. "Walavum" means a place where a judgement is given. Those people who occupied the Walauwas had the authority to pass judgement over people with the authority provided by a Royal decree either Sinhala or English. The older walauwas were neither tiled (roof), very large or highly ornate as the king had placed certain restrictions and laws. Many of the walauwas beyond the jurisdiction of the king or after the fall of the Kandyan kingdom sprang up to be large and ornate, displaying architectural influences from beyond Sri Lanka and south India. Mansions replaced the walauwas in the urban areas towards the latter part of the nineteenth century. Though they were referred to as walauwas by the public, the owners usually referred to them with modern names. There are many large mansions of more recent origin which are not walauwas both in the Kandyan and the Low Country areas. This however has changed in the years after independence with the rise of a powerful middle class based on profession and enterprise. The elites held much power within the political cycles. The most significant change occurred in the 1970s with the socialist style land reforms that were bought into place. This limited private land ownership to fifty acres, and private home ownership to two houses. Most families sold off their lands or had them taken over by the government. They retained their Walauwas, yet over the years found it hard to maintain them, resulting in many falling into a dilapidated state, while some were razed to the ground such as the Maha Kappina Walauwa, and Ragama Walauwa which were constructed in the 16th century. Some were bought for state use or others have now been converted into hotels and Shopping complex such as the Ratwatte Walauwa, Rajamanthri Walauwa and the Nugawela Walauwa.

== See also ==
- Native headmen of Ceylon
- Colonial era mansions of Colombo
- Kastane
- Sinhalese people
