= Habaraduwa West =

Coordinates: 6°00′N 80°17′E

- Interactive map of Habaraduwa West
- Country: Sri Lanka
- Province: Southern Province
- Time zone: UTC+5:30 (Sri Lanka Standard Time)

Habaraduwa West is a town in Sri Lanka. It is located within Southern Province.

== See also ==
- List of towns in Southern Province, Sri Lanka
