= Yakkalamulla Divisional Secretariat =

- Divisional Secretariat
- Country: Sri Lanka
- Province: Southern Province
- District: Galle District
- Time zone: UTC+5:30 (Sri Lanka Standard Time)

Yakkalamulla Divisional Secretariat is a Divisional Secretariat of Galle District, of Southern Province, Sri Lanka.

== Demography ==
Religion in Yakkalamulla DS Division (2012)
1. Buddhist (93.5%)
2. Hindu (5.40%)
3. Muslim (0.00%)
4. Roman Catholic (0.40%)
5. Other Christian (0.70%)
6. Other (0.00%)
