= Atapattu Walawwa =

Atapattu Walawwa is a large colonial era manor house situated at 35 Lower Dickson Road, Walawwatta, Galle, Sri Lanka.

The walawwa was constructed by Mudaliyar Don Bastian Gooneratne in 1742. The two-storey 743 m^{2} (8,000 sq ft) building is located within a 0.6 ha (1.5 acres) garden, approximately 0.5 km (0.31 mi) from the centre of Galle. The Walawwa has been the ancestral home of Gooneratne family, who were administrators of the Dutch and British colonial governments. Notable past residents of Atapattu Walawwa includes Mudaliyar Edmund Rowland Gooneratne and his son Mark Gooneratne. It is currently being used as a small seven-room boutique hotel.

On 13 December 1998 the building was formally recognised by the Government as an Archaeological Protected Monument.

== Buddhist temple ==
The Buddhist temple located at adjacent land to the Atapattu Walawwa is presently known as Sri Gunaratne Mudalindaramaya. This temple which was earlier known as Simbali Avasaya has accommodated many Sri Lankan and Japanese Buddhist monks over the years.

Sri Gunaratne Mudalindaramaya was initially built by Mudaliyar E. R Gooneratne in the 1870s and the shrine hall was constructed later by his son Mark Gooneratne in the 1920s. The shrine hall depicts statues of 'Seven Buddhas' which is rarely seen in Buddhist architecture.
