= Colonial era mansions of Sri Lanka =

This is a partial list of the many of colonial era mansions in Sri Lanka. Some of the oldest houses in Colombo 7 reflect the area’s rich architectural heritage. Among them is Alfred House, built in 1870, and Elsmere, constructed in 1919 in the heart of Cinnamon Gardens. Other notable historic residences include Villa de Mel, dating back to 1872, and Calverley House, one of the earliest, built in 1868.

== Colombo ==
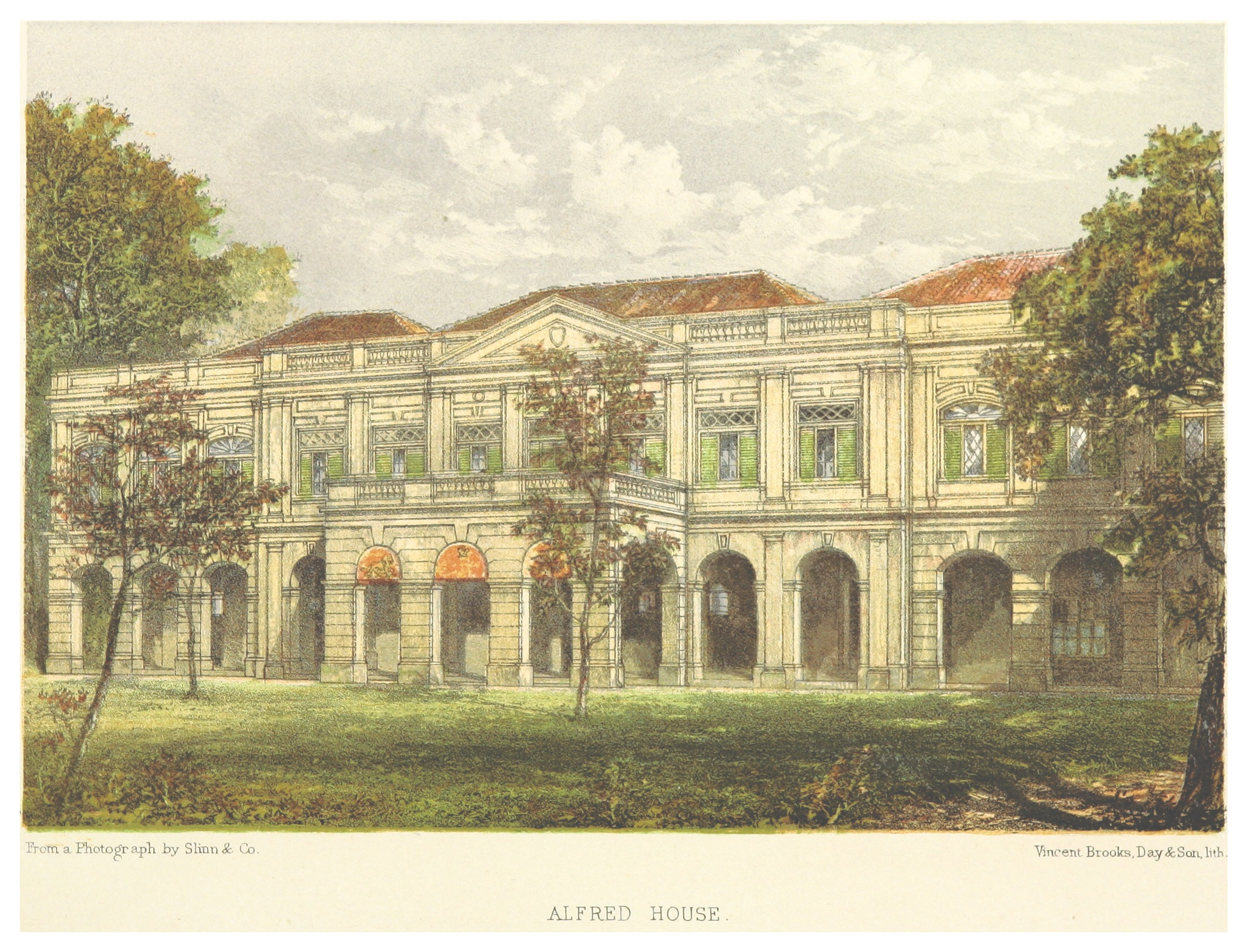
Alfred House in 1870

- Alfred House
- Clare House
- India House
- Jefferson House
- Lakshmigiri
- Modera House
- Villa De Mel
- Morven
- President's House
- Rock House
- Srawasthi Mandiraya
- Sirimathipaya Mansion
- Sirinivasa
- Temple Trees
- The Lighthouse
- Visumpaya
- Whist Bungalow
- Winyatts

== Elsewhere ==
- Richmond Castle, Kalutara
- Arcadia, Diyatalawa
- Adisham Hall
- Closenberg Hotel, Galle
- Kethumathie, Panadura
- Mel-Ville, Moratuwa
- Sumana Mansion, Ambalangoda
