= Thawalama Divisional Secretariat =

- Divisional Secretariat
- Country: Sri Lanka
- Province: Southern Province
- District: Galle District
- Time zone: UTC+5:30 (Sri Lanka Standard Time)

Thawalama Divisional Secretariat is a Divisional Secretariat of Galle District, of Southern Province, Sri Lanka.

Religion in Thawalama DS Division (2012)
1. Buddhist (93.0%)
2. Hindu (5.09%)
3. Muslim (0.03%)
4. Roman Catholic (0.95%)
5. Other Christian (0.91%)
6. Other (0.00%)
