= Benthota Divisional Secretariat =

- Divisional Secretariat
- Interactive map of Benthota Divisional Secretariat
- Country: Sri Lanka
- Province: Southern Province
- District: Galle District
- Time zone: UTC+5:30 (Sri Lanka Standard Time)

Benthota Divisional Secretariat is a Divisional Secretariat of Galle District, of Southern Province, Sri Lanka.

== Demography ==
Religion in Benthota DS Division (2012)
1. Buddhist (97.1%)
2. Hindu (0.20%)
3. Muslim (2.30%)
4. Roman Catholic (0.30%)
5. Other Christian (0.10%)
6. Other (0.00%)
