= Habaraduwa Polling Division =

Habaraduwa
- Polling Division
- Coordinates: 6.016068°N 80.318471°E
- Country: Sri Lanka
- Province: Southern Province, Sri Lanka
- Electoral District: Galle Electoral District

Area
  - Total: 109.63 km^{2} (42.33 sq mi)

Population (2012)
  - Total: 107,269
  - Density: 978/km^{2} (2,530/sq mi)
- ISO 3166 code: EC-07J

The Habaraduwa Polling Division is a Polling Division in the Galle Electoral District, in the Southern Province, Sri Lanka.

== Presidential Election Results ==
=== Summary ===
The winner of Habaraduwa has matched the final country result 5 out of 8 times. Hence, Habaraduwa is a Weak Bellwether for Presidential Elections.

Year	Habaraduwa	Galle Electoral District	MAE %	Sri Lanka	MAE %
2024	NPP	NPP		NPP	
2019	SLPP	SLPP	4.67%	SLPP	15.90%
2015	UPFA	UPFA	3.20%	NDF	11.08%
2010	UPFA	UPFA	3.20%	UPFA	8.68%
2005	UPFA	UPFA	1.97%	UPFA	10.02%
1999	PA	PA	1.68%	PA	5.58%
1994	PA	PA	2.49%	PA	1.44%
1988	SLFP	SLFP	6.83%	UNP	13.35%
1982	SLFP	UNP	7.22%	UNP	10.13%
Matches/Mean MAE	5/8	6/8	3.91%	8/8	9.52%

=== 2024 presidential election ===
Candidate	Habaraduwa		Galle Electoral District		Sri Lanka	
Candidate	Votes	%	Votes	%	Votes	%
Anura Kumara Dissanayake	35,428	52.35%	366,721	51.45%	5,634,915	42.31%
Sajith Premadasa	16,929	25.01%	189,555	26.59%	4,363,035	32.76%
Ranil Wickremesinghe	10,602	15.67%	107,336	15.06%	2,299,767	17.27%
Namal Rajapaksa	2,041	3.02%	24,382	3.42%	342,781	2.57%
Others (< 1%)	2,678	3.95%	24,826	3.48%	679,118	5.09%
Valid Votes	67,678	98.34%	712,820	98.27%	13,319,616	98.99%
Rejected Votes	1,145	1.66%	12,541	1.73%	300,300	1.01%
Total Polled	68,823	80.53%	725,361	80.31%	13,619,916	79.46%
Registered Electors	85,463		903,163		17,140,354	

=== 2019 Sri Lankan Presidential Election ===
Party	Habaraduwa		Galle Electoral District		Sri Lanka	
Party	Votes	%	Votes	%	Votes	%
Gotabaya Rajapaksa	47,659	69.40%	466,148	64.26%	6,924,255	52.25%
Sajith Premadasa	17,487	25.46%	217,401	29.97%	5,564,239	41.99%
Anura Kumara Dissanayake	2,264	3.30%	27,006	3.72%	418,553	3.16%
Other Parties (with < 1%)	1,265	1.84%	14,803	2.04%	345,452	2.61%
Valid Votes	68,675	99.13%	725,358	99.20%	13,252,499	98.99%
Rejected Votes	600	0.87%	5,878	0.80%	135,452	1.01%
Total Polled	69,275	85.46%	731,236	85.15%	13,387,951	83.71%
Registered Electors	81,062		858,749		15,992,568	

=== 2015 Sri Lankan Presidential Election ===
Party	Habaraduwa		Galle Electoral District		Sri Lanka	
Party	Votes	%	Votes	%	Votes	%
Mahinda Rajapaksa	38,028	58.86%	377,126	55.64%	5,768,090	47.58%
Maithripala Sirisena	25,932	40.14%	293,994	43.37%	6,217,162	51.28%
Other Parties (with < 1%)	643	1.00%	6,691	0.99%	138,200	1.14%
Valid Votes	64,603	99.12%	677,811	99.05%	12,123,452	98.85%
Rejected Votes	572	0.88%	6,516	0.95%	140,925	1.15%
Total Polled	65,175	80.68%	684,327	80.46%	12,264,377	78.69%
Registered Electors	80,778		850,549		15,585,942	

=== 2010 Sri Lankan Presidential Election ===
Party	Habaraduwa		Galle Electoral District		Sri Lanka	
Party	Votes	%	Votes	%	Votes	%
Mahinda Rajapaksa	39,435	66.93%	386,971	63.69%	6,015,934	57.88%
Sarath Fonseka	18,606	31.58%	211,633	34.83%	4,173,185	40.15%
Other Parties (with < 1%)	882	1.50%	9,017	1.48%	204,494	1.97%
Valid Votes	58,923	99.44%	607,621	99.38%	10,393,613	99.03%
Rejected Votes	329	0.56%	3,765	0.62%	101,838	0.97%
Total Polled	59,252	77.77%	611,386	77.82%	10,495,451	66.70%
Registered Electors	76,190		785,663		15,734,587	

=== 2005 Sri Lankan Presidential Election ===
Party	Habaraduwa		Galle Electoral District		Sri Lanka	
Party	Votes	%	Votes	%	Votes	%
Mahinda Rajapaksa	35,002	60.40%	347,233	58.41%	4,887,152	50.29%
Ranil Wickremesinghe	22,164	38.25%	239,320	40.26%	4,706,366	48.43%
Other Parties (with < 1%)	783	1.35%	7,915	1.33%	123,521	1.27%
Valid Votes	57,949	99.15%	594,468	99.08%	9,717,039	98.88%
Rejected Votes	495	0.85%	5,540	0.92%	109,869	1.12%
Total Polled	58,444	79.40%	600,008	79.86%	9,826,908	69.51%
Registered Electors	73,606		751,327		14,136,979	

=== 1999 Sri Lankan Presidential Election ===
Party	Habaraduwa		Galle Electoral District		Sri Lanka	
Party	Votes	%	Votes	%	Votes	%
Chandrika Kumaratunga	28,137	56.61%	281,154	54.91%	4,312,157	51.12%
Ranil Wickremesinghe	18,064	36.34%	195,906	38.26%	3,602,748	42.71%
Nandana Gunathilake	2,727	5.49%	27,257	5.32%	343,927	4.08%
Other Parties (with < 1%)	776	1.56%	7,702	1.50%	176,679	2.09%
Valid Votes	49,704	97.86%	512,019	98.14%	8,435,754	97.69%
Rejected Votes	1,086	2.14%	9,716	1.86%	199,536	2.31%
Total Polled	50,790	74.88%	521,735	77.43%	8,635,290	72.17%
Registered Electors	67,833		673,785		11,965,536	

=== 1994 Sri Lankan Presidential Election ===
Party	Habaraduwa		Galle Electoral District		Sri Lanka	
Party	Votes	%	Votes	%	Votes	%
Chandrika Kumaratunga	29,689	63.87%	285,398	61.40%	4,709,205	62.28%
Srima Dissanayake	16,115	34.67%	173,282	37.28%	2,715,283	35.91%
Other Parties (with < 1%)	679	1.46%	6,135	1.32%	137,040	1.81%
Valid Votes	46,483	98.61%	464,815	98.49%	7,561,526	98.03%
Rejected Votes	656	1.39%	7,112	1.51%	151,706	1.97%
Total Polled	47,139	71.05%	471,927	73.01%	7,713,232	69.12%
Registered Electors	66,342		646,373		11,158,880	

=== 1988 Sri Lankan Presidential Election ===
Party	Habaraduwa		Galle Electoral District		Sri Lanka	
Party	Votes	%	Votes	%	Votes	%
Sirimavo Bandaranaike	18,329	60.16%	148,615	53.09%	2,289,857	44.95%
Ranasinghe Premadasa	11,500	37.75%	124,912	44.62%	2,569,199	50.43%
Ossie Abeygunasekera	637	2.09%	6,417	2.29%	235,701	4.63%
Valid Votes	30,466	98.58%	279,944	98.43%	5,094,754	98.24%
Rejected Votes	438	1.42%	4,461	1.57%	91,499	1.76%
Total Polled	30,904	50.36%	284,405	49.34%	5,186,256	55.87%
Registered Electors	61,369		576,390		9,283,143	

=== 1982 Sri Lankan Presidential Election ===
Party	Habaraduwa		Galle Electoral District		Sri Lanka	
Party	Votes	%	Votes	%	Votes	%
Hector Kobbekaduwa	22,600	51.22%	180,925	42.96%	2,546,348	39.05%
J. R. Jayewardene	18,960	42.97%	211,544	50.23%	3,450,815	52.93%
Rohana Wijeweera	2,239	5.07%	20,962	4.98%	273,428	4.19%
Other Parties (with < 1%)	327	0.74%	7,707	1.83%	249,460	3.83%
Valid Votes	44,126	99.19%	421,138	98.78%	6,520,156	98.78%
Rejected Votes	361	0.81%	5,198	1.22%	80,470	1.22%
Total Polled	44,487	79.37%	426,336	81.84%	6,600,626	80.15%
Registered Electors	56,053		520,909		8,235,358	

== Parliamentary Election Results ==
=== Summary ===
The winner of Habaraduwa has matched the final country result 5 out of 7 times. Hence, Habaraduwa is a Weak Bellwether for Parliamentary Elections.

Year	Habaraduwa	Galle Electoral District	MAE %	Sri Lanka	MAE %
2024	NPP	NPP		NPP	
2019	SLPP	SLPP		SLPP	
2015	UPFA	UPFA	4.40%	UNP	8.88%
2010	UPFA	UPFA	0.66%	UPFA	5.13%
2004	UPFA	UPFA	1.90%	UPFA	6.37%
2001	PA	UNP	2.24%	UNP	5.22%
2000	PA	PA	1.14%	PA	3.35%
1994	PA	PA	3.51%	PA	8.26%
1989	UNP	UNP	2.07%	UNP	4.69%
Matches/Mean MAE	5/7	6/7	2.27%	7/7	5.99%

=== 2024 Sri Lankan Parliamentary Election ===
Party	Habaraduwa		Galle Electoral District		Sri Lanka	
Party	Votes	%	Votes	%	Votes	%
NPP	38,080	70.50%	406,428	68.07%	6,863,186	61.56%
SJB	7,964	14.74%	93,486	15.66%	1,968,716	17.66%
NDF	2,116	3.92%	30,453	5.10%	500,835	4.49%
SLPP	3,217	5.96%	31,201	5.23%	350,429	3.14%
Other Parties (with < 1%)	1,175	2.09%	35,523	8.94%	1,464,840	13.14%
Valid Votes	54,017	96.30%	610,052	97.63%	11,148,006	94.35%
Rejected Votes	2,074	3.70%	35,751	2.36%	667,240	5.65%
Total Polled	56,091	65.72%	620,165	68.67%	11,815,246	68.93%
Registered Electors	85,347		903,163		17,140,354	

=== 2020 Sri Lankan Parliamentary Election ===
Party	Habaraduwa		Galle Electoral District		Sri Lanka	
Party	Votes	%	Votes	%	Votes	%
SLPP	42,497	75.91%	430,334	70.54%	6,853,693	59.09%
SJB	8,628	15.41%	115,456	18.93%	2,771,984	23.96%
NPP	2,349	4.20%	29,963	4.91%	445,958	3.84%
UNP	1,332	2.38%	18,968	3.11%	249,435	2.15%
Other Parties (with < 1%)	1,175	2.09%	15,331	2.51%	1,277,866	11.01%
Valid Votes	55,981	97.78%	610,052	97.63%	11,598,936	95.35%
Rejected Votes	3,351	2.21%	35,751	2.36%	744,373	4.42%
Total Polled	59,332	73.39%	645,803	78.00%	12,343,309	77.66%
Registered Electors	82,019		867,799		16,263,885	

=== 2015 Sri Lankan Parliamentary Election ===
Party	Habaraduwa		Galle Electoral District		Sri Lanka	
Party	Votes	%	Votes	%	Votes	%
UPFA	32,017	55.24%	312,518	50.07%	4,732,664	42.48%
UNP	22,194	38.29%	265,180	42.49%	5,098,916	45.77%
JVP	3,282	5.66%	37,778	6.05%	544,154	4.88%
Other Parties (with < 1%)	472	0.81%	8,659	1.39%	82,852	0.74%
Valid Votes	57,965	97.78%	624,135	97.63%	11,140,333	95.35%
Rejected Votes	1,312	2.21%	15,107	2.36%	516,926	4.42%
Total Polled	59,284	73.39%	639,318	78.00%	11,684,111	77.66%
Registered Electors	80,778		819,666		15,044,490	

=== 2010 Sri Lankan Parliamentary Election ===
Party	Habaraduwa		Galle Electoral District		Sri Lanka	
Party	Votes	%	Votes	%	Votes	%
UPFA	27,660	67.02%	305,307	66.17%	4,846,388	60.38%
UNP	10,644	25.79%	120,101	26.03%	2,357,057	29.37%
DNA	2,809	6.81%	33,663	7.30%	441,251	5.50%
Other Parties (with < 1%)	160	0.39%	2,317	0.50%	32,313	0.40%
Valid Votes	41,273	94.48%	461,388	95.05%	8,026,322	96.03%
Rejected Votes	2,410	5.52%	24,013	4.95%	581,465	6.96%
Total Polled	43,683	57.33%	485,401	61.67%	8,358,246	59.29%
Registered Electors	76,190		787,139		14,097,690	

=== 2004 Sri Lankan Parliamentary Election ===
Party	Habaraduwa		Galle Electoral District		Sri Lanka	
Party	Votes	%	Votes	%	Votes	%
UPFA	30,648	58.97%	306,385	56.58%	4,223,126	45.70%
UNP	19,417	37.36%	209,399	38.67%	3,486,792	37.73%
JHU	1,667	3.21%	22,826	4.22%	552,723	5.98%
Other Parties (with < 1%)	238	0.46%	2,901	0.54%	60,066	0.65%
Valid Votes	51,970	94.31%	541,511	94.69%	9,241,931	94.52%
Rejected Votes	3,135	5.69%	30,380	5.31%	534,452	5.47%
Total Polled	55,105	75.94%	571,891	79.81%	9,777,821	75.74%
Registered Electors	72,566		716,609		12,909,631	

=== 2001 Sri Lankan Parliamentary Election ===
Party	Habaraduwa		Galle Electoral District		Sri Lanka	
Party	Votes	%	Votes	%	Votes	%
PA	23,508	44.58%	232,931	42.98%	3,330,815	37.19%
UNP	21,617	40.99%	238,989	44.10%	4,086,026	45.62%
JVP	6,882	13.05%	61,806	11.41%	815,353	9.10%
Other Parties (with < 1%)	728	1.38%	8,188	1.51%	143,033	1.60%
Valid Votes	52,735	95.73%	541,914	95.66%	8,955,844	94.77%
Rejected Votes	2,355	4.27%	24,561	4.34%	494,009	5.23%
Total Polled	55,090	77.08%	566,475	81.09%	9,449,878	76.03%
Registered Electors	71,473		698,558		12,428,762	

=== 2000 Sri Lankan Parliamentary Election ===
Party	Habaraduwa		Galle Electoral District		Sri Lanka	
Party	Votes	%	Votes	%	Votes	%
PA	25,974	50.87%	264,601	50.08%	3,899,329	45.33%
UNP	19,639	38.46%	212,055	40.14%	3,451,765	40.12%
JVP	4,481	8.78%	41,620	7.88%	518,725	6.03%
Other Parties (with < 1%)	964	1.89%	10,072	1.91%	250,489	2.91%
Valid Votes	51,058	N/A	528,348	N/A	8,602,617	N/A

=== 1994 Sri Lankan Parliamentary Election ===
Party	Habaraduwa		Galle Electoral District		Sri Lanka	
Party	Votes	%	Votes	%	Votes	%
PA	29,716	59.63%	277,956	56.39%	3,887,805	48.94%
UNP	18,528	37.18%	203,268	41.24%	3,498,370	44.04%
SLPF	819	1.64%	7,239	1.47%	90,078	1.13%
MEP	732	1.47%	4,145	0.84%	68,538	0.86%
Other Parties (with < 1%)	39	0.08%	306	0.06%	813	0.01%
Valid Votes	49,834	96.21%	492,914	95.96%	7,943,688	95.20%
Rejected Votes	1,962	3.79%	20,763	4.04%	400,395	4.80%
Total Polled	51,796	78.07%	513,677	79.57%	8,344,095	74.75%
Registered Electors	66,342		645,559		11,163,064	

=== 1989 Sri Lankan Parliamentary Election ===
Party	Habaraduwa		Galle Electoral District		Sri Lanka	
Party	Votes	%	Votes	%	Votes	%
UNP	14,840	51.59%	183,962	50.40%	2,838,005	50.71%
SLFP	12,857	44.69%	152,096	41.67%	1,785,369	31.90%
MEP	472	1.64%	2,676	0.73%	90,480	1.62%
USA	303	1.05%	18,160	4.98%	141,983	2.54%
Other Parties (with < 1%)	296	1.03%	8,111	2.22%	269,739	4.82%
Valid Votes	28,768	94.14%	365,005	93.94%	5,596,468	93.87%
Rejected Votes	1,792	5.86%	23,536	6.06%	365,563	6.13%
Total Polled	30,560	50.53%	388,541	68.03%	5,962,031	63.60%
Registered Electors	60,474		571,146		9,374,164	

== Demographics ==
=== Ethnicity ===
The Habaraduwa Polling Division has a Sinhalese majority (99.7%) . In comparison, the Galle Electoral District (which contains the Habaraduwa Polling Division) has a Sinhalese majority (94.4%)

Ethnicity in Habaraduwa
1. Sinhalese (99.7%)
2. Other (0.30%)

=== Religion ===
The Habaraduwa Polling Division has a Buddhist majority (99.3%) . In comparison, the Galle Electoral District (which contains the Habaraduwa Polling Division) has a Buddhist majority (93.9%)

Religion in Habaraduwa
1. Buddhist (99.3%)
2. Other (0.70%)
