= Udunuwara Divisional Secretariat =

Udunuwara Divisional Secretariat උඩුනුවර
- Divisional Secretariat
- Interactive map of Udunuwara Divisional Secretariat
- Country: Sri Lanka
- Province: Central Province
- District: Kandy District

Government
  - Divisional Secretary: R.T.P.Sumanasekara

Area
  - Total: 26 sq mi (68 km^{2})

Population (2024)
  - Total: 121,018
  - Density: 4,600/sq mi (1,780/km^{2})
- Time zone: UTC+5:30 (Sri Lanka Standard Time)

The Udunuwara Divisional Secretariat (Sinhala: උඩුනුවර, Tamil: உடுநுவர) is a Divisional Secretariat of Kandy District, of Central Province, Sri Lanka.

== History ==
The former President of Sri Lanka, Dingiri Banda Wijetunga (1916–2008), entered Parliament for the first time when he successfully contested the Udunuwara electorate at the 1965 general election and remained as the Udnuwara parliament member until he finished his term in parliament.

== Historic regions and settlements ==
The following settlements represent the pre-independence 'korale' and 'wasama' subdivisions still familiar in the region, as officially registered in the 1911 Census, though the villages still reflect the modern layout. The wasama regions would have later been converted into grama niladhari subdivisions.

=== Gangapalata Korale ===
- Gangoda Wasama
  - Gangoda
  - Talawatta
- Mampitiya Wasama
  - Mampitiya
  - Keliyalpitiya
  - Boyagama
- Handessa Wasama
  - Handessa
  - Naranwala
  - Alapalawala
- Hendeniya Wasama
  - Hendeniya
  - Yalegoda
  - Miwatura
- Angunuwala Wasama
  - Angunawala
  - Pitigalla
- Karamada Wasama
  - Godapala
  - Karamada
- Kamburadeniya Wasama
  - Kamburadeniya
  - Palle Aludeniya
- Petiyagoda Wasama
  - Petiyagoda
  - Ulakkonde
  - Miwaladeniya
  - Yattakele
- Dehipagoda Wasama
  - Dehipagoda
- Weligalla Wasama
  - Weligalla
  - Polgaha-anga
  - Uda Aludeniya
- Palkumbura Wasama
  - Palkumbura
  - Pitunugama
  - Kotakedeniya

=== Medapalata Korale ===
- Wegiriya Wasama
  - Wegiriya
  - Menikbowa
- Talawatura Wasama
  - Girigama
  - Lunugama
  - Wannipola
  - Talawatura
- Eladetta Wasama
  - Eladetta
  - Elamaldeniya
  - Dawulagala
  - Arattana
  - Wahunkoho
- Daskara Wasama
  - Daskara
  - Alkemada
  - Delamada
  - Hatuagoda
- Bambaradeniya Wasama
  - Bambaradeniya
  - Radagoda
  - Ambagastenna
- Embekke Wasama
  - Embekka
  - Siyambalagoda
  - Meddegoda
  - Rangama
- Watupola Wasama
  - Watupola
  - Werawala
- Hiddaulla Wasama
  - Hiddaulla
  - Haladiwala
  - Ganguldeniya
- Hiyarapitiya Wasama
  - Arawwawela
  - Hiyarapitiya
- Imbuldeniya Wasama
  - Imbuldeniya
  - Tirappuwa
  - Hiyawela
  - Walgama
- Rabbegamuwa Wasama
  - Rabbegamuwa
- Deliwela Wasama
  - Deliwela
- Warakagoda Wasama
  - Warakagoda
  - Hepana
  - Kiriwawula
- Gadaladeniya Wasama
  - Gadaladeniya
  - Piligama
  - Pamunuwa
- Mugatiyapola Wasama
  - Mugatiyapola

=== Kandupalata Korale ===
- Ganhata Wasama
  - Ganhata
  - Appallagoda
  - Kotagaloluwa
  - Deldeniya
  - Galkoho
- Ambanwala Wasama
  - Ambanwala
  - Kuradeniya
- Welamboda Wasama
  - Welamboda
  - Watadeniya
- Nikahetiya Wasama
  - Nikahetiya
- Walagedara Wasama
  - Walagedara
  - Lagamuwa
- Wattapola Wasama
  - Wattapola
  - Panabokka
- Urulewatta Wasama
  - Urulewatta
  - Rammalaka
  - Alanduwaka
- Matgamuwa Wasama
  - Kurukuttala
  - Matgamuwa

== Demographics ==
Religion in Udunuwara DS Division (2012)
1. Buddhist (72.0%)
2. Hindu (2.29%)
3. Muslim (24.5%)
4. Roman Catholic (0.76%)
5. Other Christian (0.41%)
6. Other (0.01%)
