= Ganguldeniya Grama Niladhari Division =

Ganguldeniya
- Grama Niladhari Division
- Interactive map of Ganguldeniya
- Coordinates: 7.239854°N 80.550304°E
- Country: Sri Lanka
- Province: Central Province
- District: Kandy District
- Divisional Secretariat: Udunuwara Divisional Secretariat
- Electoral District: Kandy Electoral District
- Polling Division: Udunuwara Polling Division

Area
  - Total: 0.47 km^{2} (0.18 sq mi)
- Elevation: 542 m (1,778 ft)

Population (2012)
  - Total: 544
  - Density: 1,157/km^{2} (3,000/sq mi)
- ISO 3166 code: LK-2139200

Ganguldeniya

Ganguldeniya Grama Niladhari Division is a Grama Niladhari Division of the Udunuwara Divisional Secretariat of Kandy District of Central Province, Sri Lanka. It has Grama Niladhari Division Code 88.

Haladiwela, Matgamuwa, Hepana, Hiddaulla, Wattappola, Mathgamuwa and Panabokke are located within, nearby or associated with Ganguldeniya.

Ganguldeniya is a surrounded by the Wattappola, Hiddavulla West, Urulewatta, Warakagoda and Hepana Grama Niladhari Divisions.

== Demographics ==
=== Ethnicity ===
The Ganguldeniya Grama Niladhari Division has a Sinhalese majority (100.0%). In comparison, the Udunuwara Divisional Secretariat (which contains the Ganguldeniya Grama Niladhari Division) has a Sinhalese majority (72.7%) and a significant Moor population (24.4%)

Ethnicity in Ganguldeniya
1. Sinhalese (100.0%)
2. Other (0.00%)

=== Religion ===
The Ganguldeniya Grama Niladhari Division has a Buddhist majority (100.0%). In comparison, the Udunuwara Divisional Secretariat (which contains the Ganguldeniya Grama Niladhari Division) has a Buddhist majority (72.0%) and a significant Muslim population (24.5%)

Religion in Ganguldeniya
1. Buddhist (100.0%)
2. Other (0.00%)
