= Alapalawala East Grama Niladhari Division =

Alapalawala East
- Grama Niladhari Division
- Interactive map of Alapalawala East
- Coordinates: 7.240391°N 80.580540°E
- Country: Sri Lanka
- Province: Central Province
- District: Kandy District
- Divisional Secretariat: Udunuwara Divisional Secretariat
- Electoral District: Kandy Electoral District
- Polling Division: Udunuwara Polling Division

Area
  - Total: 0.86 km^{2} (0.33 sq mi)
- Elevation: 573 m (1,880 ft)

Population (2012)
  - Total: 746
  - Density: 867/km^{2} (2,250/sq mi)
- ISO 3166 code: LK-2139170

Alapalawala East

Alapalawala East Grama Niladhari Division is a Grama Niladhari Division of the Udunuwara Divisional Secretariat of Kandy District of Central Province, Sri Lanka. It has Grama Niladhari Division Code 16.

Angunawela, Handessa, Angunawala and Piligalla are located within, nearby or associated with Alapalawala East.

Alapalawala East is surrounded by the Yalegoda West, Piligalla West, Naranwala, Alapalawala West, Mampitiya and Rajagiriya Grama Niladhari Divisions.

== Demographics ==
=== Ethnicity ===
The Alapalawala East Grama Niladhari Division has a Sinhalese majority (80.6%) and a significant Sri Lankan Tamil population (18.6%). In comparison, the Udunuwara Divisional Secretariat (which contains the Alapalawala East Grama Niladhari Division) has a Sinhalese majority (72.7%) and a significant Moor population (24.4%)

Ethnicity in Alapalawala East
1. Sinhalese (80.6%)
2. Sri Lankan Tamil (18.6%)
3. Other (0.80%)

=== Religion ===
The Alapalawala East Grama Niladhari Division has a Buddhist majority (79.2%) and a significant Hindu population (13.1%). In comparison, the Udunuwara Divisional Secretariat (which contains the Alapalawala East Grama Niladhari Division) has a Buddhist majority (72.0%) and a significant Muslim population (24.5%)

Religion in Alapalawala East
1. Buddhist (79.2%)
2. Hindu (13.1%)
3. Roman Catholic (6.40%)
4. Other Christian (1.20%)
5. Other (0.00%)
