= Gampola =

Gampola ගම්පොල கம்பளை
- Town
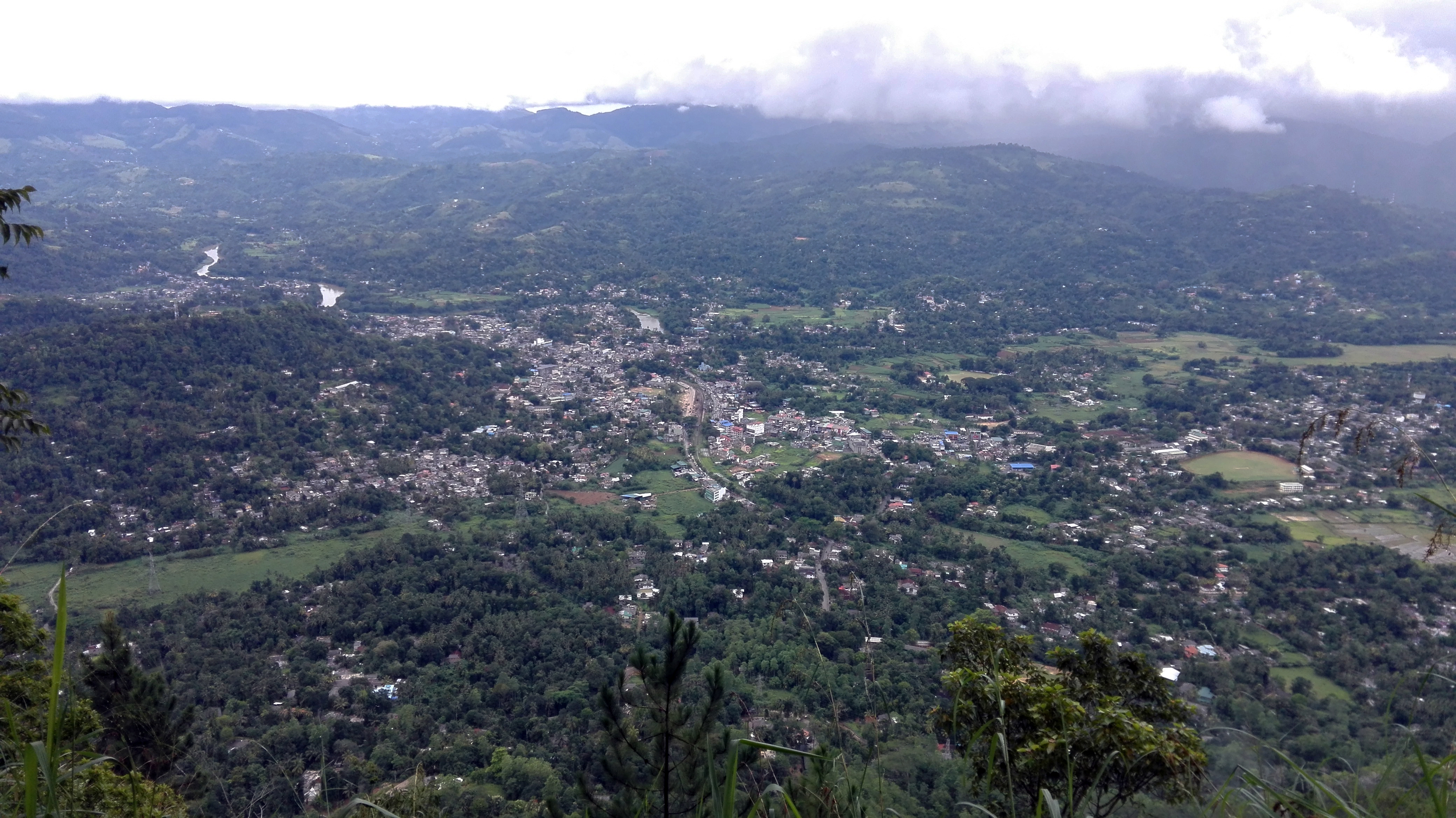
- Gampola Skyline

- Location within Sri Lanka
- Coordinates: 7°9′53″N 80°34′36″E
- Country: Sri Lanka
- Province: Central Province
- District: Kandy District
- Division: Udapalatha Division

Government
  - Type: Local Authority
  - Body: Gampola Urban Council
  - Chairman: Furkhan Hajiar

Area
  - Town: 94.0 km^{2} (36.3 sq mi)
  - Urban: 3.30 km^{2} (1.27 sq mi)

Population (2012)
  - Town: 37,871
  - Urban density: 11,476/km^{2} (29,720/sq mi)
  - Metro: 91,716
  - Metro density: 975.7/km^{2} (2,527/sq mi)
- Time zone: UTC+5:30 (Sri Lanka Standard Time Zone)

Gampola (Sinhala: ගම්පොල, Tamil: கம்பளை) is a town located in Kandy District, in Sri Lanka's Central Province. The town is governed by an Urban Council. Gampola was made the capital of the island by King Buwanekabahu IV, who ruled for four years in the mid-fourteenth century. The last king of Gampola was King Buwanekabahu V, who ruled the island for 29 years. A separate city was built in Kotte during this time by a noble known as Alagakkonara. The longest sleeping Buddha statue in South Asia is located in the Saliyalapura Temple, Gampola.

== Attractions ==
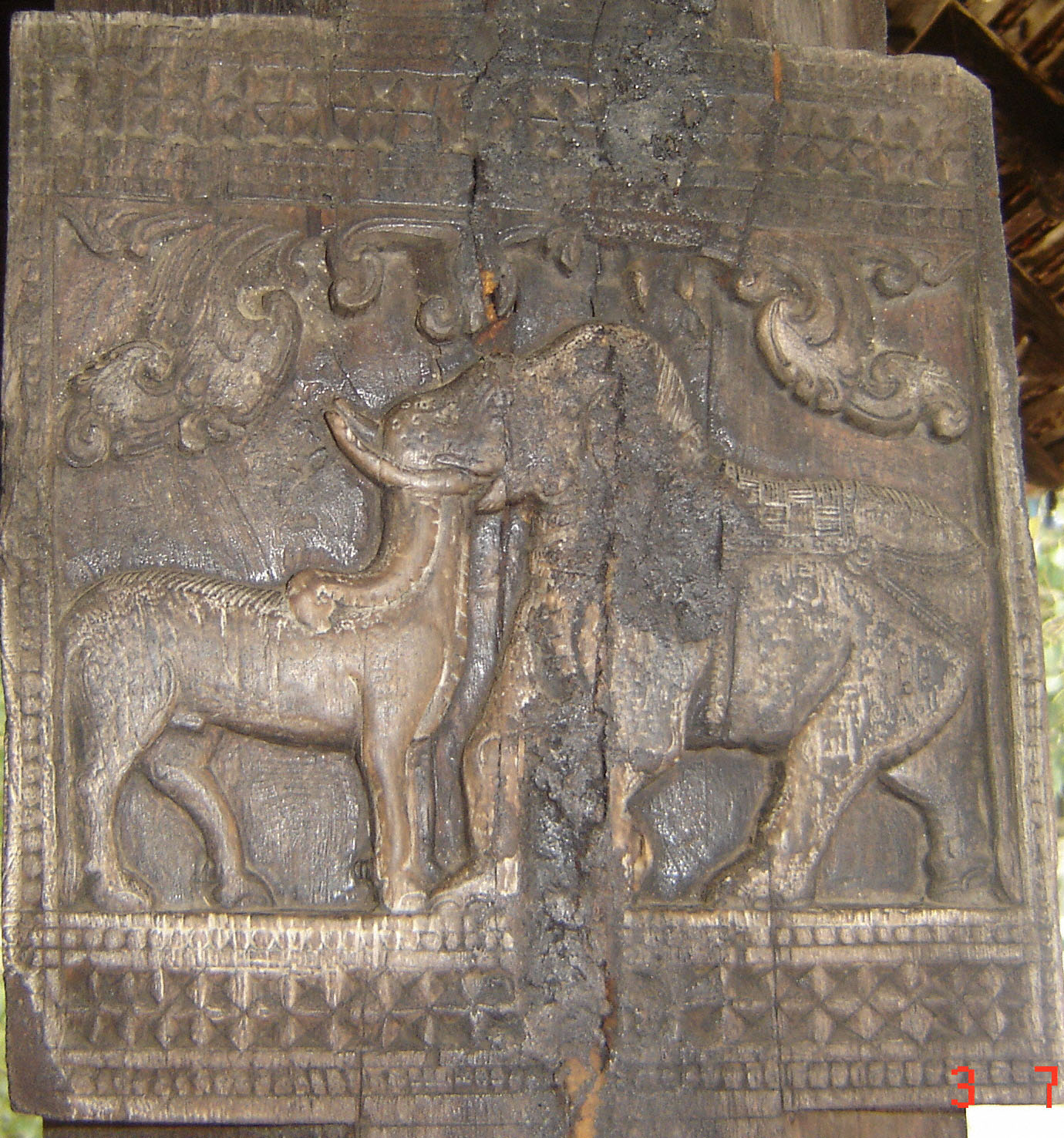
Temple wood carvings

Among the remnants of Gampola era, the most famous temples are Lankathilaka, Gadaladeniya and Embekka Devalaya. The ancient stone scripts (Shila Lekhana) of Lankathilaka temple helps to reveal a considerable amount of vital information regarding the Gampola era. The statue of Buddha of the temple indicates style of South Indian arts. The Ambekka Dewalaya possess a large collection of wood carvings, where no other temple in Sri Lanka owns such a collection.

The town is located amongst Sri Lanka's central highlands, hence the climate stays mild throughout the year. Located 1,087 m (3,566 ft) above mean sea level, Ambuluwawa mountain hosts a hill top tourist spot that houses a biodiversity complex celebrating environmentalism and cultural and religious diversity. A notable feature of this complex is a large winding tower resembling a Buddhist stupa, which is located on the mountain peak. Gampola has a lot of shops and a huge residential area.

== Demographics ==
The majority of people in Gampola are Sinhalese and minority of Muslims respectively. Other small communities include, Sri Lankan Tamils, Indian Tamils, Burgher and Malay.

Ethnicity in Udapalatha(Gampola)DS Division
Population	Percent
Sinhalese	52.91%
Muslim	24.4%
Sri Lankan Tamils	11.90%
Indian Tamils	8.10%
Others	0.64%

Source:statistics.gov.lk.

== Geography ==
Gampola, or so called Gangasiripura because of the Mahaweli (Mahaweli Ganga) flowing by its side, is a town which is located at an altitude of 300–500 m (980–1,640 ft), situated in a valley surrounded by hills and located near to Kandy. Geologically the region belongs to the Highland Complex of Sri Lanka and major rock formation is Precambrian charnockite gneiss with strips of quartz and biotite gneiss here and there. Soil profile of the region could identify as Red Yellow Podzolic soils and Mountain Regosols. Mean annual rainfall is in between 3,000 and 3,500 mm (120 and 140 in) and mean annual temperature is in between 20 and 25 °C (68 and 77 °F). Due to the geomorphology of the Gampola and its vicinity, which characterised by steep hills stand from plain, it was declared as a landslide prone area. However, with its flat terrain with being a catchment area of River Mahaweli, our region has become highly used in agricultural purposes both in traditional (paddy, chena, home gardens) and industrial plantations (majorly tea). Tea, natural forests, mixed home gardens, steeply dissected hilly and rolling, soil profile with the prominent A1 horizon and lithosol soils can be considered as its unique ecological background. Administratively, Gampola is an urban council belongs to the Kandy district of Central Province. In traditional administration region system, it once belonged to the Maya rata before the 13th cent. AD and in Kandy period to the Ganga Pahala Koralaya of Uda Palatha of Kandy district.

== Prehistoric period ==
The prehistoric studies of Sri Lanka were initiated around in 1885 by surface collections of quartz and chert artefactual implements secured by John Pole (of Scarborough estate of Maskeliya) and by E. Ernest Green. Latter had done some observations at Peradeniya and Nawalapitiya (near to Gampola) could recover some stone fragments which he believed as stone implements used by pre historic Sri Lankans. Contemporarily to these studies, Mr Rober Bruce Foote could establish a considerable account about the Indian pre history who may probably first discovered stone implements from Gampola. He surveyed the Atgalle hill near Gampola and bought some lithics to India with him. Eventually, he sent these remains and Pole's collection to the Madras museum, ventured as 'Neolithic' stone tools of Sri Lanka.

However, some years later Sarasins pronounced those are Nawalapitiya artefacts of Green's are indubitably artefacts and Alchin could also found some remains from Nawalapitiya too. Recently, Siran Deraniyagala has classified Sri Lanka into six major eco zones and our study area allocated into the Zone D 2 or wet zone below 900 m, is defined as a special pre historic zone in the country with its specific features. But the concern on the pre historic Gampola is considerably lacking while comparing to the other regions of Sri Lanka, it can be rich with evidence as well as other areas.

== Historical period ==
Aryan colonisation or native innovations introduced some new subsistence patterns toward the agriculture and husbandry as well as sedentism. Mahawali River itself provided water while many other chanals and rivers flow into the river too. The flat terrain at famous Gampola wela or paddy fields of Gampola is cultivated by the water of an ancient irrigation called Raja ala origin at the Ulapane. Another paddy field of the area famous as 'Mahara'. This background of economic change is closely tied with the spread of Buddhism since 3rd century BC. The first such evidence of human settlements in the historic period are clearly defined by the Early Brahmic Inscriptions (EBI), so such in Gampola area could take as a support to identifying early settlements in the lower montane valley of the Mahaweli Ganga at Gampola. Vegiriya Devale near to Gampola bear an EBI could date to 3rd century BC.

text - 1). Bata Sumanasa Tisaha upasika [Suma]nāya upasika Tisalaya upa[saka]....[ku]marasa gapati Dutakasa kubakara Sonaha datika Sumanasa 2). manikara-Date patike manikara Cuda sapatike

Meaning - [The cave] of lord Sumana, of Tissa, of the female lay devotee Sumanā, of the female lay devotee Tissalā, of the householder Dutaka, of the potter Sona, and of the ivory worker Sumana. The lapidary Datta is a partner. The lapidary Cuda is a co-partner.

Though these EBI clearly shows the human habitation and Buddhism in the region at the time, evidence about since then can only found here and there until 13th century AD. with one of the Sri Lankan Capitals established amidst the green valleys and wooded hillocks of Gampola in the period of this latter said, settlements were extended from Gampola to Peradeniya and finally to the Kandy. Ambalam or resting houses are not rare while some still stand along the ancient road crossed Gampola. For an example, Panabokke Ambalama could date back to the Gampola era or near time of Sri Lanka. Further, one of the ancient routes for Sri Pada was tracked through this region. Minister Devapathiraja in the reign of Parakramabahu II, built a Thirty-five cubit long (300 riyan) bridge and other thirty cubits long bridge across the Kanāmadirioya for facilitates the pilgrims of the route and also made a statue of God Sumana at Gampola city.

However, comparing to the other capitals of the country, this one was neither highly populated nor developed, but could provide a resistant for an attack by its natural settings. Though its value as the kingdom lasts with a brief period of few kings, it considerably influences on contemporary political status, which was actually complicated as well as blurred.

The Gampola Kingdom formed around 'Siduruvana Rata' commanded supremacy on fourteen other terrestrial divisions known as 'Rata's and occupies an important place in history as it used to be the seat of government of the Sinhalese Kings during the period 1314 – 1415 A.D. Buvanekabahu IV -1341-1351, who the son of Vijayabahu V moved his capital to Gampola. Mahavansa mentioned it as follows.

"....... after the death of these two kings there reigned a fourth ruler of men bearing the name of Bhuvanekabahu, who was a man of wisdom and faith..... dwelt in the city of Gangasiripura....."

After his death, his brother Parakramabahu V – 1344-1359 reigned as king initially at Dedigama and later at Gampola. He later lost the throne to the son of Buvaneabahu IV and fled to Java. Vickramabahu III (1359-1374), son of Buvanekabahu IV was installed as king in Gampola. However, he was merely a figure head as the real ruler was Nissanka Alakeswara who even defeated Tamil power of Arya Chakravarti, the leader of contemporary Jaffna. Sinhalese troops could defeat the Chakravarti's men at Mathake who came for attack Gampola.

Buvanekabahu V (1372-1408), the son of Nissanka Alakeswara and nephew of Vickramabahu III was the next to rule. He fled Gampola to Raigama in the face of attacks by Arya Chakravarti. Vira Alakeswara then defeated the forces of Arya Chakravarti but Buvanekabahu did not return to Gampola. Thus the Sinhalese kings installed his brother in law Virabahu II- 1408-1410 as king of Gampola. Meanwhile, when Buvanekabahu died, Virabahu's brother Vijayabahu was crowned king of Kotte. He made several attacks on Chinese missions resulting in his capture and being taken to China with his family. Facing execution, the Chinese Emperor allowed Prince Sepanana to come back to Lanka to become king.

The political or social value of the Gampola not regained since it falls in front of the upcoming Kotte and Kandy. However, the short period of the kingdom in the power, it could make three Buddhist convocations for well-being of Buddhism and further, for the first time in Buddhist history of Sri Lanka, the post called "sangaraja' or king of Sangha came to the Buddhism in this period. It seems this could make a new up rise of Buddhism at the time.

== Archaeological sites ==
There are some valuable archaeological remains located in the vicinity of Gampola.

Aladeniya Temple - The only remained wooden door frame belonged to Gampola period can found from this temple, which called 'rambawa' or golden door frame.

Ilupandeniya Viharaya - remains of Gampola period stone sculptures.

Walwasagoda temple and devalaya - Two devala and a chaitya from the 14th century.

Niyamgampaya Rajamaha viharaya - This historic temple located 3 km (1.9 mi) away from the city. Mahāvaṃsa mentioned the site as 'Niyamgampasada' and as 'Niyamgampaya' in Nampota. Sinhala Dalada Vamsaya says the temple once gave protection to the Tooth Relic. Inscription erected by Wickramabahu III (1356–64) could found in the precinct of the viharaya. Stone sculptures in the temple are considered among the few remains that left by Gampola Kingdom.

Polwatta viharaya (Buwaneka piriwena) - This is also near to city. The first temple was known as Lankatilaka viharaya, constructed by Rajadhi Rajasingha (1782–1789) with the architectural advisory of Eldeniye Rajakaruna. Temple was renamed as Buwaneka Piriwena in 1928.

Botalapitiya Bo tree - On 7 June 1871, there was a famous debate between Migettuwatte Gunananda Theros and a Christian priest.

Kahatapitiya mosque - According to legend, an Islamic saint called Atulla, who pilgrimed to Sri Pada in the reign of Buwanekabahu IV of Gampola has meditated at the land here by looking at the direction of Sri Pada. King has granted the land to this saint and after his death, a mosque was erected at the place. However, the present building at the place is not older as that much. Legends also say Henakanda Bisso Bandara, Queen of Wickramabahu III is interred here.

Ambuluwawa Kanda - a 1,071 m (3,515 ft) high mountain lies just west of Gampola. A cone shaped Stupa, known as Ambuluwawa tower was built on this mountain.

Some other sites of archaeological value are: Aludeniya, Embekka Devalaya, Katarangala, Kumbaloluwa, Gadaladeniya, Niggammana, Wallahagoda, Wegiriya and Sinhapitiya.

== Notable people ==
- D. M. Jayaratne
- W. M. P. B. Dissanayake
- Albert Moses
