= Alagoda =

Coordinates: 7°22′N 80°35′E

- Village
- Interactive map of Alagoda
- Country: Sri Lanka
- Province: Central Province
- District: Kandy District
- Divisional secretariat: Poojapitiya Divisional Secretariat
- Time zone: UTC+5:30 (Sri Lanka Standard Time)

Alagoda is a village in Kandy District of Sri Lanka's Central Province. The village is located near Palipana, on the road to Alawatugoda.

== History ==
In Archibald Campbell Lawrie's 1896 gazetteer of the province, he writes that the people of the area of Alagoda and Madadeniya are not of good character.

== Demographics ==
Historical population
Year	Pop.	±%
1881	165	—
1891	138	−16.4%

== See also ==
- List of towns in Central Province, Sri Lanka
