= Elamaldeniya =

- Village
- Interactive map of Elamaldeniya
- Coordinates: 7°12′48″N 80°34′56″E
- Country: Sri Lanka
- Province: Central Province
- District: Kandy District
- Divisional secretariat: Yatinuwara
- Time zone: UTC+5:30 (Sri Lanka Standard Time)

Elamaldeniya (එළමල්දෙණිය) is a small village in Kandy District Central Province, Sri Lanka. It is located within the Udunuwara Divisional Secretariat, adjacent to the village of Muruthagahamula, and near Gelioya.

== History ==
Elamaldeniya was historically located in Eladetta Wasama within Medapalata Korale, alongside the villages of Eladetta, Dawulagala, Arattana, and Wahunkoho.

== Demographics ==
Historical population
Year	Pop.	±%
1901	116	—
1911	141	+21.6%
1921	189	+34.0%

== See also ==
- List of towns in Central Province, Sri Lanka
