= Alawatugama =

- Village
- Location within Sri Lanka
- Coordinates: 7°10′12″N 80°45′59″E
- Country: Sri Lanka
- Province: Central Province
- District: Nuwara Eliya District
- Divisional secretariat: Hanguranketha Divisional Secretariat
- Time zone: UTC+5:30 (Sri Lanka Standard Time)

Alawatugama is a village in located in Nuwara Eliya District of Sri Lanka's Central Province. It is a hamlet of Damunumeya.

== History ==
The inhabitants of the village were "Paduwo, Smiths, [and] Durayo", according to Archibald Campbell Lawrie's 1896 gazetteer of the province, referring to the caste system.

The Berammane Bogaha Maluwa vihāra (monastery) located in the village is in ruins.

== Demographics ==
Historical population
Year	Pop.	±%
1881	184	—
1891	76	−58.7%

== See also ==
- List of towns in Central Province, Sri Lanka
