= Mampitiya =

- Village
- Country: Sri Lanka
- Province: Central Province
- District: Kandy District
- Divisional secretariat: Udunuwara Divisional Secretariat
- Time zone: UTC+5:30 (Sri Lanka Standard Time)

Mampitiya is a village in Kandy District, Central Province, Sri Lanka. It is located in Gangapalata, Udunuwara.

== Demographics ==
Historical population
Year	Pop.	±%
1881	80	—
1891	47	−41.2%
1901	63	+34.0%
1911	31	−50.8%
1921	29	−6.5%
Gangoda was grouped with Keliyalpitiya, Alapalawela, Kituldeniya, and Naranwala during the 1871 census.

== See also ==
- List of towns in Central Province, Sri Lanka
