= Talawatta =

- Village
- Interactive map of Talawatta
- Country: Sri Lanka
- Province: Central Province
- District: Kandy District
- Divisional secretariat: Udunuwara Divisional Secretariat
- Time zone: UTC+5:30 (Sri Lanka Standard Time)

Talawatta is a village in Kandy District, Central Province, Sri Lanka. It is located in Gangapalata, Udunuwara.

== History ==
The village was described as "low caste" in Archibald Campbell Lawrie's 1896 gazetteer of the province.

== Demographics ==
Historical population
Year	Pop.	±%
1881	90	—
1891	74	−17.8%
1901	113	+52.7%
1911	140	+23.9%
1921	161	+15.0%
Gangoda was grouped with Boyagama and Gangoda during the 1871 census.

== See also ==
- List of towns in Central Province, Sri Lanka
