= Alkemada =

- Village
- Location within Sri Lanka
- Coordinates: 7°12′29″N 80°34′52″E
- Country: Sri Lanka
- Province: Central Province
- District: Kandy District
- Divisional secretariat: Udunuwara Divisional Secretariat
- Time zone: UTC+5:30 (Sri Lanka Standard Time)

Alkemada is a village located in the Kandy District, of Sri Lanka's Central Province. The village is a hamlet of Eladetta, and is inhabited by Moors.

== Demographics ==
Historical population
Year	Pop.	±%
1881	56	—
1891	71	+26.8%

== See also ==
- List of towns in Central Province, Sri Lanka
