= Alawattegama =

- Village
- Location within Sri Lanka
- Coordinates: 7°21′31″N 80°33′02″E
- Country: Sri Lanka
- Province: Central Province
- District: Kandy District
- Divisional secretariat: Thumpane Divisional Secretariat
- Time zone: UTC+5:30 (Sri Lanka Standard Time)

Alawattegama is a village that is located within Kandy District of Sri Lanka's Central Province.

== History ==
Archibald Campbell Lawrie describes the village in his 1896 gazetteer as a "Duraya" village, with inhabitants of "Panna Durayo" (grass cutters).

== Demographics ==
Historical population
Year	Pop.	±%
1881	171	—
1891	135	−21.1%

== See also ==
- List of towns in Central Province, Sri Lanka
