= Alakola-anga =

- Village
- Location within Sri Lanka
- Coordinates: 7°30′27″N 80°36′09″E
- Country: Sri Lanka
- Province: Central Province
- District: Matale District
- Time zone: UTC+5:30 (Sri Lanka Standard Time)

Alakola-anga is a village located near the town of Matale, in Matale District of Sri Lanka's Central Province.

== History ==
The inhabitants were "Vellalas, Blacksmiths, Welli Durayo, [and] Hangarammu, who do iron work", according to Archibald Campbell Lawrie's 1896 gazetteer of the province, referring to different castes.

== Demographics ==
Historical population
Year	Pop.	±%
1881	104	—
1891	48	−53.8%

== See also ==
- List of towns in Central Province, Sri Lanka
