= Akarahaduwa =

- Village
- Location within Sri Lanka
- Coordinates: 7°39′09″N 80°39′43″E
- Country: Sri Lanka
- Province: Central Province
- District: Matale District
- Time zone: UTC+5:30 (Sri Lanka Standard Time)

Akarahaduwa is a village in Matale District, in Sri Lanka's Central Province. It is bounded on the west, north, and east by the Amban River, a tributary of the Mahaweli River.

== History ==
According to Archibald Campbell Lawrie's 1896 gazetteer of the province, the inhabitants of the village smelted and delivered iron. A considerable number of the villagers were Moors who supported their lebbe and their mosque.

== Demographics ==
Historical population
Year	Pop.	±%
1881	91	—
1891	84	−7.7%

== See also ==
- List of towns in Central Province, Sri Lanka
