= Alanduwaka =

Coordinates: 7°25′N 80°54′E

- Village
- Interactive map of Alanduwaka
- Country: Sri Lanka
- Province: Central Province
- District: Kandy District
- Divisional secretariat: Udunuwara Divisional Secretariat
- Time zone: UTC+5:30 (Sri Lanka Standard Time)

Alanduwaka is a village located in Kandy District, in Sri Lanka's Central Province.

== History ==
Archibald Campbell Lawrie writes in his 1896 gazetteer of the province that the inhabitants of Alanduwaka are of the "Chalia" caste.

== Demographics ==
Historical population
Year	Pop.	±%
1881	157	—
1891	106	−32.5%

== See also ==
- List of towns in Central Province, Sri Lanka
