= Gangoda (Udunuwara Divisional Secretariat, Kandy District) =

Dehianga දෙහිඅංග
- Village
- Interactive map of Dehianga
- Coordinates: 7°18′N 80°33′E
- Country: Sri Lanka
- Province: Central Province
- District: Kandy District
- Divisional secretariat: Udunuwara
- Elevation: 618 m (2,028 ft)
- Time zone: UTC+5:30 (Sri Lanka Standard Time)
- Postal code: 20038

Gangoda is a village in Kandy District, Central Province, Sri Lanka. It is located near Embilmeegama and Boyagama, south of the Colombo–Kandy A1 highway, in Gangapalata, Udunuwara.

== Demographics ==
Historical population
Year	Pop.	±%
1881	266	—
1891	258	−3.0%
1901	311	+20.5%
1911	397	+27.7%
1921	427	+7.6%
Gangoda was grouped with Boyagama and Talawatta during the 1871 census.

== See also ==
- List of towns in Central Province, Sri Lanka
