= Alakola-ela =

- Village
- Location within Sri Lanka
- Coordinates: 7°39′00″N 80°37′00″E
- Country: Sri Lanka
- Province: Central Province
- District: Matale District
- Divisional secretariat: Pallepola Divisional Secretariat
- Time zone: UTC+5:30 (Sri Lanka Standard Time)

Alakola-ela is a village located in Matale District of Sri Lanka's Central Province.

== History ==
The village contains the ruins of a stupa (dagoba) and carved pillars. As of the writing of Archibald Campbell Lawrie's 1896 gazetteer of the province, the inhabitants of the village were winnowers.

== Demographics ==
Historical population
Year	Pop.	±%
1881	39	—
1891	29	−25.6%

== See also ==
- List of towns in Central Province, Sri Lanka
