= Aludeniya =

- Village
- Country: Sri Lanka
- Province: Central Province
- District: Kandy District
- Divisional secretariat: Thumpane Divisional Secretariat
- Time zone: UTC+5:30 (Sri Lanka Standard Time)

Aludeniya is a village in Sri Lanka. Located in the Central Province district of Kandy, it lies west of Galagedara and south of Gunadaha.

== History ==
During the Kandyan period, the village was one of many village that were "degraded" by King Raja Sinha, for showing cowardice during the Sinhalese–Portuguese War. The village was inhabited by "Gattaru—Vellalas". A vihāra was built after 1815 by Kinigomuwe Unnanse.

== Demographics ==
Historical population
Year	Pop.	±%
1881	322	—
1891	335	+4.0%

== See also ==
- List of towns in Central Province, Sri Lanka
