= Watadeniya =

Watadeniya වටදෙනිය
- Village
- Interactive map of Watadeniya
- Coordinates: 7.195011°N 80.552494°E
- Country: Sri Lanka
- Province: Central Province
- District: Kandy
- Divisional Secretariat: Udunuwara
- Time zone: UTC+5:30 (Sri Lanka Standard Time )
- Postal code: [102]

Watadeniya is a village in Sri Lanka, located within the Kandy District in the country's Central Province. It is served by the B091 (Daulagala-Watadeniya) and B172 (Kadugannawa-Gampola) roads.

== See also ==
- List of towns in Central Province, Sri Lanka
