= Palipana (surname) =

Palipana or Palipane (Sinhala: පලිපාන, romanized: Palipāna) is a Sinhalese surname. Notable people with the surname include:

- Dinesh Palipana (born 1984), Australian doctor, legal professional and disability advocate
- Bertram Ivor Palipane (1913–2003), Ceylonese lawyer and politician

== See also ==
- Palipana, a village in Sri Lanka
