= Panabokke (surname) =

Panabokke (Sinhala: පානබොක්කේ, romanized: Pānabokkē) is a Sinhalese surname. Notable people with the surname include:

- Theodore Braybrooke Panabokke (1909–1989), Sri Lankan politician
- Tikiri Bandara Panabokke I, Ceylonese colonial-era legislator
- Tikiri Bandara Panabokke II (1883–1963), Ceylonese colonial-era legislator, lawyer and diplomat

== See also ==
- Panabokke, a village in Sri Lanka
