= Alayaya =

- Village
- Location within Sri Lanka
- Coordinates: 7°27′00″N 80°38′00″E
- Country: Sri Lanka
- Province: Central Province
- District: Matale District
- Time zone: UTC+5:30 (Sri Lanka Standard Time)

Alayaya is a village on the outskirts of the town of Matale, in the district of the same name in Sri Lanka's Central Province.

== Demographics ==
Historical population
Year	Pop.	±%
1881	43	—
1891	35	−18.6%

== See also ==
- List of towns in Central Province, Sri Lanka
