= Alagalla Kondagama =

Coordinates: 7°18′N 80°29′E

Alagalla
- Village
- Interactive map of Alagalla
- Country: Sri Lanka
- Province: Central Province
- District: Kandy District
- Divisional secretariat: Hataraliyadda Divisional Secretariat
- Time zone: UTC+5:30 (Sri Lanka Standard Time)

Alagalla Kondagama is a village located 6.4 km (4 mi) northwest of Kadugannawa, within Kandy District of Sri Lanka's Central Province.

== Demographics ==
Historical population
Year	Pop.	±%
1881	321	—
1891	306	−4.7%

== See also ==
- List of towns in Central Province, Sri Lanka
