= Cyclone Ditwah =

North Indian Ocean cyclonic storm in 2025

Cyclonic Storm Ditwah
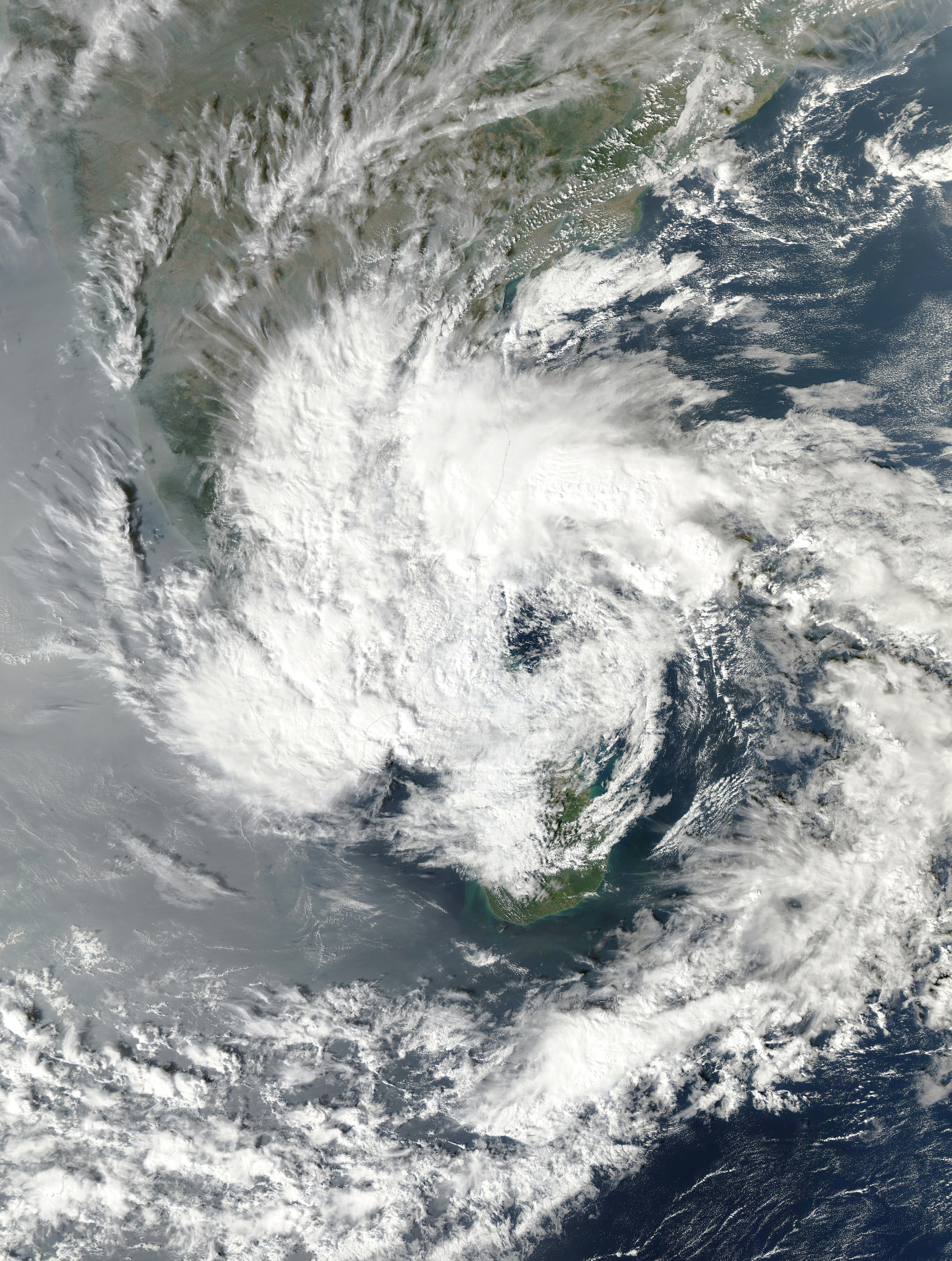
- Ditwah near peak intensity shortly after landfall in Sri Lanka on 29 November

Meteorological history
- Formed: 26 November 2025
- Remnant low: 3 December 2025
- Dissipated: 4 December 2025

Cyclonic storm
- 3-minute sustained (IMD)
- Highest winds: 75 km/h (45 mph)
- Lowest pressure: 1000 hPa (mbar); 29.53 inHg

Tropical storm
- 1-minute sustained (SSHWS/JTWC)
- Highest winds: 75 km/h (45 mph)
- Lowest pressure: 999 hPa (mbar); 29.50 inHg

Overall effects
- Fatalities: 647
- Injuries: 21
- Missing: 183
- Damage: >$4.14 billion (2025 USD)
- Areas affected: Sri Lanka; Southern India
- Part of the 2025 North Indian Ocean cyclone season

Cyclonic Storm Ditwah (Note: The name Ditwah (Arabic: ديطوح, [diːtˤ.waħ]) was contributed by Yemen and refers to Detwah Lagoon in Arabic.) was a weak but catastrophic tropical cyclone that brought heavy rain to Sri Lanka and Southern India in late November and early December 2025. The fourteenth tropical depression and fourth cyclonic storm of the 2025 North Indian Ocean cyclone season, Ditwah originated from a well-marked low before steadily intensifying into a cyclonic storm and making landfall in Sri Lanka. Ditwah then moved off Sri Lanka and entered the Bay of Bengal, where it re-intensified and began to parallel the Coromandel Coast of India. On 30 November, the system began to weaken due to increasingly unfavorable conditions. It lingered off to the coast of Tamil Nadu and Pondicherry. It weakened into a deep depression later that day, and by 2 December, the system further weakened into a depression before becoming a remnant low on 3 December.

Most of the impact of Ditwah was concentrated in Sri Lanka. The storm caused heavy flooding and landslides, killing over 600 people and causing over US$1.6 billion dollars of damage in the country. It was the deadliest natural disaster in the country since the 2004 Indian Ocean earthquake and tsunami.

== Meteorological history ==
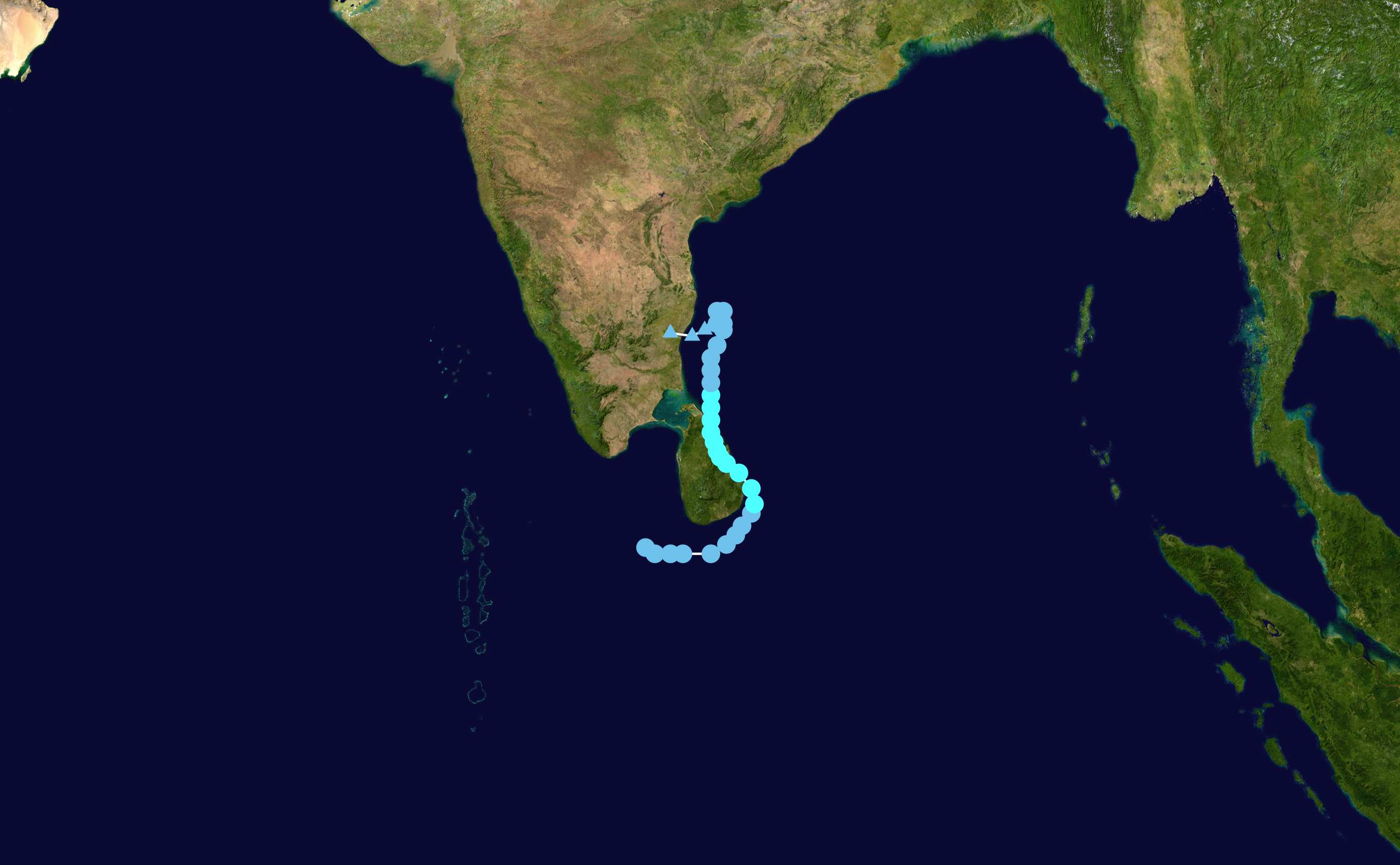
Map plotting the storm's track and intensity, according to the Saffir–Simpson scale Map key Saffir–Simpson scale Tropical depression (≤38 mph, ≤62 km/h) Tropical storm (39–73 mph, 63–118 km/h) Category 1 (74–95 mph, 119–153 km/h) Category 2 (96–110 mph, 154–177 km/h) Category 3 (111–129 mph, 178–208 km/h) Category 4 (130–156 mph, 209–251 km/h) Category 5 (≥157 mph, ≥252 km/h) Unknown Storm type Tropical cyclone Subtropical cyclone Extratropical cyclone, remnant low, tropical disturbance, or monsoon depression

At 18:00 UTC on 26 November 2025, the India Meteorological Department (IMD) began to track a depression formed from a well marked low just offshore the southeastern coast of Sri Lanka, due to favourable conditions such as high sea surface temperatures and mid-level vertical wind shear being low (10–15 knots). The depression would intensify further, first into a deep depression at 00:00 UTC on 27 November, then into a Cyclonic Storm at 06:00 UTC, when it received the name Ditwah. Ditwah's clouds soon became increasingly organised into a curved band pattern.

Over the next few days, Ditwah crossed Sri Lanka while maintaining cyclonic storm intensity, then moved into the Bay of Bengal on 29 November and headed northward. Ditwah slightly intensified once back over water, before beginning to weaken on 30 November due to increased wind shear, inflow of dry air, and cooler sea-surface temperatures. Later that day, Ditwah weakened to a deep depression at 12:00 UTC. The system then continued to slowly parallel to the coast of Southern India as a Deep Depression into 1 December. That evening at 18:00 UTC, Ditwah made a turn and began to travel southwestwards. By 2 December, Ditwah had weakened to a depression. Ditwah became a well-marked low pressure area on 3 December before making a landfall on the North Tamil Nadu coast.

=== Effect of climate change ===
In the aftermath of the storm, scientists at the World Weather Attribution group studied the storm to determine how much human-caused climate change influenced Cyclone Ditwah. They found that, around Sri Lanka, heavy precipitation events are "about 28% to 160% more intense" due to global warming. They further wrote that higher sea surface temperatures (SSTs) made more energy available for tropical storm development. "Without the trend related to the 1.3°C rise in global temperatures, the SSTs would have been about one degree colder and below the 1991-2020 normal."

== Preparations ==
=== Sri Lanka ===
The Sri Lankan government faced criticism over its response to advance warnings of Cyclone Ditwah. However, the exceptional scale of the disaster was also driven by extreme rainfall, widespread flooding and landslides. While the cyclone and its associated natural hazards could not have been prevented, subsequent assessments indicated that improved preparedness and early action could have mitigated the extent of the resulting damage and loss of life.

=== India ===
The India Meteorological Department (IMD) issued red alerts for parts of north Tamil Nadu and Puducherry, warning of extremely heavy rainfall and strong winds as the system tracked along the coast.

Chennai International Airport pre-emptively cancelled dozens of flights, and schools and colleges were closed in affected districts.

The National Disaster Response Force (NDRF) deployed multiple teams across Tamil Nadu and issued port and marine advisories in coordination with state authorities.

== Impact ==
Casualties by country
Country	Deaths	Injuries	Missing	Damage
Sri Lanka	644	18	183	$4.1 billion
India	3	3	—	>$40.6 million
Total	647	21	183	>$4.14 billion

=== Sri Lanka ===
Heavy rains and landslides resulted in at least 643 deaths, 18 injuries, and 183 people missing, making Ditwah the deadliest natural disaster in Sri Lanka since the 2004 Indian Ocean earthquake and tsunami. There were 234 deaths and 81 missing in Kandy District, 89 deaths and 37 missing in Nuwara Eliya District, 90 deaths and 11 missing in Badulla District, 61 deaths and 11 missing in Kurunegala District, 37 deaths and 2 missing in Puttalam District, 32 deaths and 39 missing in Kegalle District, 28 deaths and 9 missing in Matale District, 16 deaths and 1 missing in Gampaha District, 13 deaths in Anuradhapura District, 9 deaths and 1 missing in Colombo District, 8 deaths in Ampara District, 4 deaths in Monaragala District, 3 deaths in Jaffna District, 2 deaths in Vavuniya District, 2 deaths in Mannar District, 2 deaths in Batticaloa District, 2 deaths in Polonnaruwa District and a single death in Galle District, Hambantota District and Ratnapura District. Additionally, a Bell 212 helicopter of the Sri Lanka Air Force crashed in Wennappuwa during relief operations, killing the pilot and injuring four others.

Flooding and landslides destroyed 6,200 homes and damaged 96,545 others nationwide. Military units rescued 69 people from a flooded bus in Anuradhapura District. A landslide in Gangoda buried 20 people. Three people were killed in Sainthamaruthu, Ampara District after their car was swept away by floodwaters.

The Mavil Aru bund breach caused flooding across Trincomalee District, while train services in hill regions were suspended after mud and debris blocked tracks. Cities along the Kelani River including Kaduwela, Kolonnawa, and Hanwella remained inundated for days after the storm.

Residents living near reservoirs were ordered to evacuate as water levels rose. The Disaster Management Centre issued advisories for communities downstream of the Mavil Aru tank in Trincomalee District, where the bund later breached in several places.

Power outages affected about 30 percent of the country, and major hydropower plants such as Kotmale and Rantambe were temporarily shut down. An estimated 1.46 million people (407,594 families) were affected, with 59,000 families sheltered in 1,529 emergency centres.

Government officials estimated the economic loss to be Rs1.03 trillion (US$3.4 billion), while the World Bank estimated the cost to be slightly higher, amounted to Rs1.3 trillion (US$4.1 billion).

=== India ===
At least three people and 149 cattle were killed in rain-related incidents in Tamil Nadu, where Ditwah brought widespread flooding and agricultural losses. Two people died when walls collapsed in Thoothukudi and Thanjavur, and one in Mayiladuthurai from electrocution. About 57,000 hectares of farmland and 234 huts were damaged. Preliminary losses in coastal Tamil Nadu were estimated at ₹3.5 billion (US$40.6 million). Heavy rain also affected parts of Andhra Pradesh and Telangana, the latter experiencing a brief cold spell as temperatures dropped after the storm.

== Aftermath ==
Government offices and schools were closed as heavy rains intensified, with the Ministry of Education confirming temporary nationwide closures and authorising university administrations to decide on higher-education shutdowns.

The Sri Lanka Armed Forces deployed more than 25,000 personnel for relief work. This included SAR missions using the four operational Bell 212, Bell 206 and Mil Mi-17 helicopters in its fleet, resulting in the use of Bell 412 used for VIP transport. The Sri Lanka Air Force carried out surveillance operations using KA-360ER and airlifting dry rations, HADR equipments using Y-12. Sri Lanka Army deployed its Unicorn/Uni Buffel vehicles, WMZ/BTR vehicles of the and the Sri Lanka Navy deployed boats.

On 28 November, president Anura Kumara Dissanayake declared a nationwide state of emergency to expedite disaster-response coordination and resource mobilisation.

While conducting disaster relief operations, a Sri Lanka Air Force Bell 212 helicopter crashed in the Wennappuwa area, killing the pilot and injuring four other Air Force personnel. Five Sri Lanka Navy personnel died while conducting flood-mitigation operations at Chalai Lagoon near Chundikkulam.

SpaceX satellite internet service Starlink announced that it would provide free satellite internet to new and existing customers in areas of Sri Lanka and Indonesia affected by flooding from Cyclone Ditwah through the end of December 2025, and stated that it was working with the Sri Lankan government to support restoration of connectivity in badly hit districts.

== Humanitarian response ==
Party	Notes
Countries
Australia	Australia initially pledged AU$ 1 million to support immediate response and recovery efforts in Sri Lanka following the devastating impacts of Cyclone Ditwah. On December 4th, Australia announced an additional AU$ 2.5 million, bringing the total contribution to AU$ 3.5 million to help with the ongoing response and recovery efforts.
Bangladesh	The Government of Bangladesh sent C130J of Bangladesh Air Force with humanitarian aid and essential relief items to Sri Lanka on 3 December.
Bhutan	Bhutan contributed US$ 200,000 to aid Sri Lanka’s recovery efforts.
China	The Government of China announced a humanitarian aid package for Sri Lanka's disaster recovery efforts, reaffirming solidarity. The assistance includes US$1 million in cash and RMB10 million worth of relief supplies. Additionally, an Air China Cargo Boeing 747-400F carrying relief supplies worth Rs. 400 million landed in Sri Lanka on 8 December.
India	Operation Sagar Bandhu is India's rapid Humanitarian Assistance and Disaster Relief (HADR) mission to support Sri Lanka following the cyclone. Seven Indian Navy ships: INS Vikrant, INS Udaygiri, INS Sukanya, INS Gharial and three Mk. IV LCUs (LCU 51, 54, 57), delivered a total of over 1,030 tonnes of relief materials. Additionally, two C-130J and an Il-76 of the Indian Air Force airlifted 31.5 tonnes of materials to the nation. A C-17 Globemaster transferred two field hospitals, supported by personnel from the Shatrujeet Brigade of the Indian Army, to Sri Lanka. The Il-76 also moved two National Disaster Response Force (NDRF) teams of 80 personnel along with four canines for search and rescue operations. While the Indian Navy initially deployed two Chetak helicopters from Vikrant, they were replaced by two Mi-17 V5 helicopters which carried out daily operations for a week in the country, delivering 8 tonnes of materials and rescuing 65 people. The Indian Army with airlift support from the IAF transferred four Bailey bridges to Sri Lanka, two of which are being deployed in Jaffna District and Chilaw as of 8 December.
Ireland	The Government of Ireland committed €500,000 in humanitarian funding to assist relief efforts in Sri Lanka following Cyclone Ditwah. The funds will support the work of the International Federation of Red Cross, the Red Crescent Societies (IFRC) and the Sri Lanka Red Cross Society to provide essential support to affected communities.
Japan	The Government of Japan decided to dispatch an assessment team to Sri Lanka through the Japan International Cooperation Agency (JICA) in response to massive damages in Sri Lanka caused by Cyclone Ditwah. 30+ Japanese emergency disaster management experts and medical professionals established medical camp in Chilaw after the floods crippled the main hospital.
Maldives	Maldives Public Service Media (PSM), with 37 media outlets, held a live telethon from 30 November 2025 into 2 December, raising MVR 11,015,854.65 and USD 43,681.31. These efforts contributed to the Maldives emerging as one of Sri Lanka’s largest donors in the Cyclone Ditwah recovery, with total contributions amounting to USD 2.4 million through government aid, private donations, and in‑kind support such as 25,000 cases of canned fish. PSM Managing Director Abdullah Yameen said funds had been deposited, with more expected from unopened boxes. Donations came via a Bank of Maldives account and collection boxes in Malé, including contributions from the PNC parliamentary group, Bank of Maldives, Stelco, Sun Siyam Group, Road Development Corporation employees, and Crown & Champa Resorts. The Government of Maldives pledged USD 50,000 and 25,000 cases of canned tuna. Sri Lanka’s High Commissioner Mohamed Rizvi Hassen thanked the Maldives for its swift response.
Myanmar	A Shaanxi Y-8 of Myanmar Air Force with relief supplies arrived in Colombo 6 December, carrying relief supplies that include medical items, hygiene products and other essential goods. The consignment was delivered alongside a delegation from the Government of Myanmar.
Nepal	Nepal extended its condolences to Sri Lanka over the floods and announced US$200,000 in assistance for relief and recovery efforts. The Ministry of Foreign Affairs issued a statement saying "Nepal stands firmly with Sri Lanka during this difficult time."
Pakistan	Pakistan deployed PNS Saif (F253)'s Harbin Z-9 for search and rescue operations in Sri Lanka. Pakistan Air Force C130 Aircraft arrived in Sri Lanka in 3 December with 47-member specialised Pakistan Army search and rescue unit, along with 6.5 tonnes of essential equipment, Additionally Pakistan has dispatched 80 tons of humanitarian assistance to Sri Lanka through the Pakistan National Disaster Management Authority (NDMA), in coordination with SriLankan Airlines
Russia	Russia sent EMERCOM Ilyushin Il-76 with 35 tonnes of humanitarian aid to Sri Lanka on 10th December.
Switzerland	The Government of Switzerland dispatched a humanitarian relief consignment to Sri Lanka through the Swiss Agency for Development and Cooperation (SDC) in response to the severe impacts of Cyclone Ditwah. A specialised shipment of approximately 2.6 metric tons of equipment, including water-purification units and other essential WASH supplies, was flown from Zurich to Bandaranaike International Airport.
United Arab Emirates	The UAE launched an urgent humanitarian response for Sri Lankan flood victims. The Emirates Red Crescent and Joint Operations Command (JOC) coordinated the aid, which included search/rescue teams and delivery of essential supplies. Three C-17 Globemaster III flights of United Arab Emirates Air Force and charted flight arrived with Urban Search and Rescue (USAR) team and relief cargo.
United Kingdom	The UK pledged $890,000 (£675,000) in urgent humanitarian aid, delivered with the Red Cross and UN, for Sri Lanka's Cyclone Ditwah recovery. The aid provides essential life-saving supplies, including food, shelter, and medical care.The UK later increased its total humanitarian support to £1,000,000 (approximately US$1.32 million) to expand relief operations across the most affected regions.
United States	The United States pledged $2 million to assist urgent relief efforts in Sri Lanka. On 7 December, two USAF C-130J Super Hercules arrived in Sri Lanka with the teams from teams from the 374th Airlift Wing, the 36th Contingency Response Group, and the III Marine Expeditionary Force to enhance airlift, logistics and rapid response operations with Sri Lanka Air Force.
Organizations
European Union	EU releases 1.8 million euros in emergency aid for Sri Lanka’s flood response. Alongside financial support, the EU is sending in-kind relief through its Civil Protection Mechanism. Germany has contributed 4,600 shelter items, while France is dispatching more than 3,400 emergency supplies. Italy is deploying a team of engineering experts to assist with recovery work and infrastructure safety.
United Nations	United Nations entities such as UNICEF, the World Health Organization and the International Organization for Migration coordinated their disaster relief efforts with government agencies and humanitarian organisations to provide food, shelter and emergency assistance. The United Nations in Sri Lanka also called for the activiation of the emergency coordination system in order to mobilize its teams to support relief efforts.
IFRC	The International Federation of Red Cross and Red Crescent Societies (IFRC) launched an emergency appeal to help 500,000 people affected by the flooding, focusing on shelter, health and community support.
Companies
Binance	Binance Holdings Ltd., through its subsidiary Binance Charity, pledged LKR 61.6 million (USD 200,000) to the Sri Lanka Red Cross Society to support urgent relief and recovery efforts in the country.
Bybit	Bybit pledged USD 100,000 in humanitarian aid for Sri Lanka’s relief. Despite warnings against cryptocurrencies, the firm is coordinating with the Central Bank of Sri Lanka to ensure effective distribution to victims.

=== Operation Sagar Bandhu (India) ===
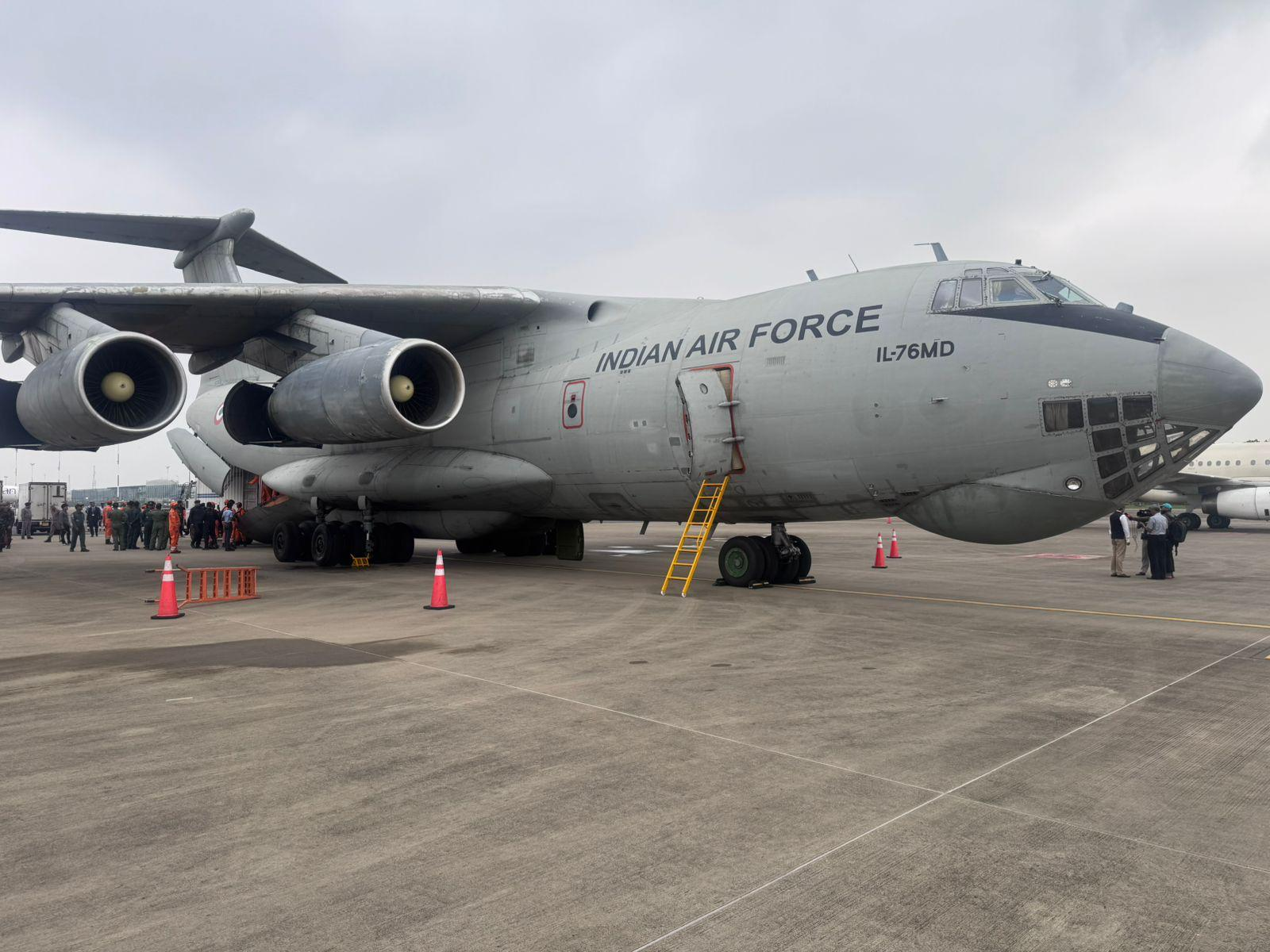
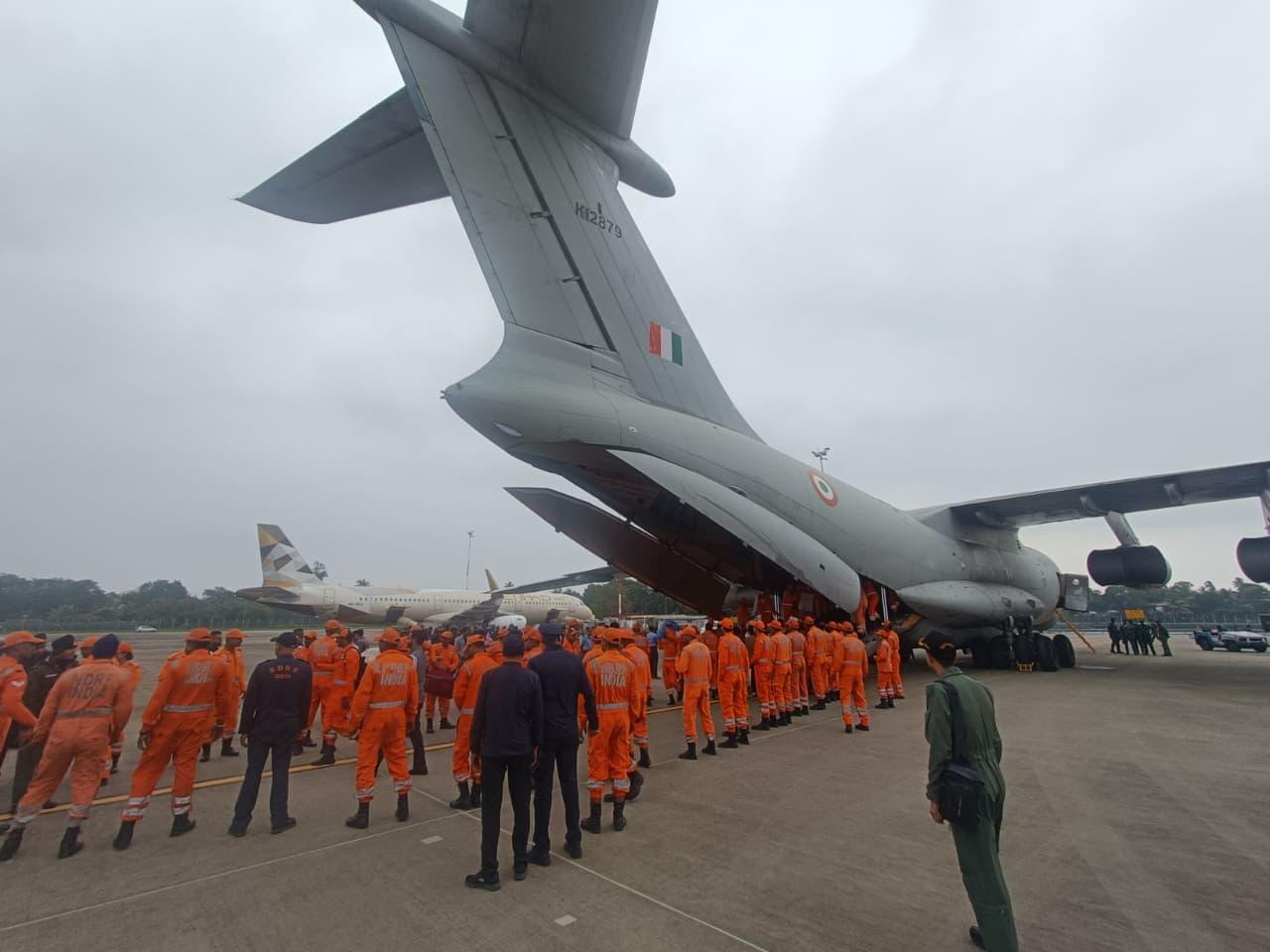
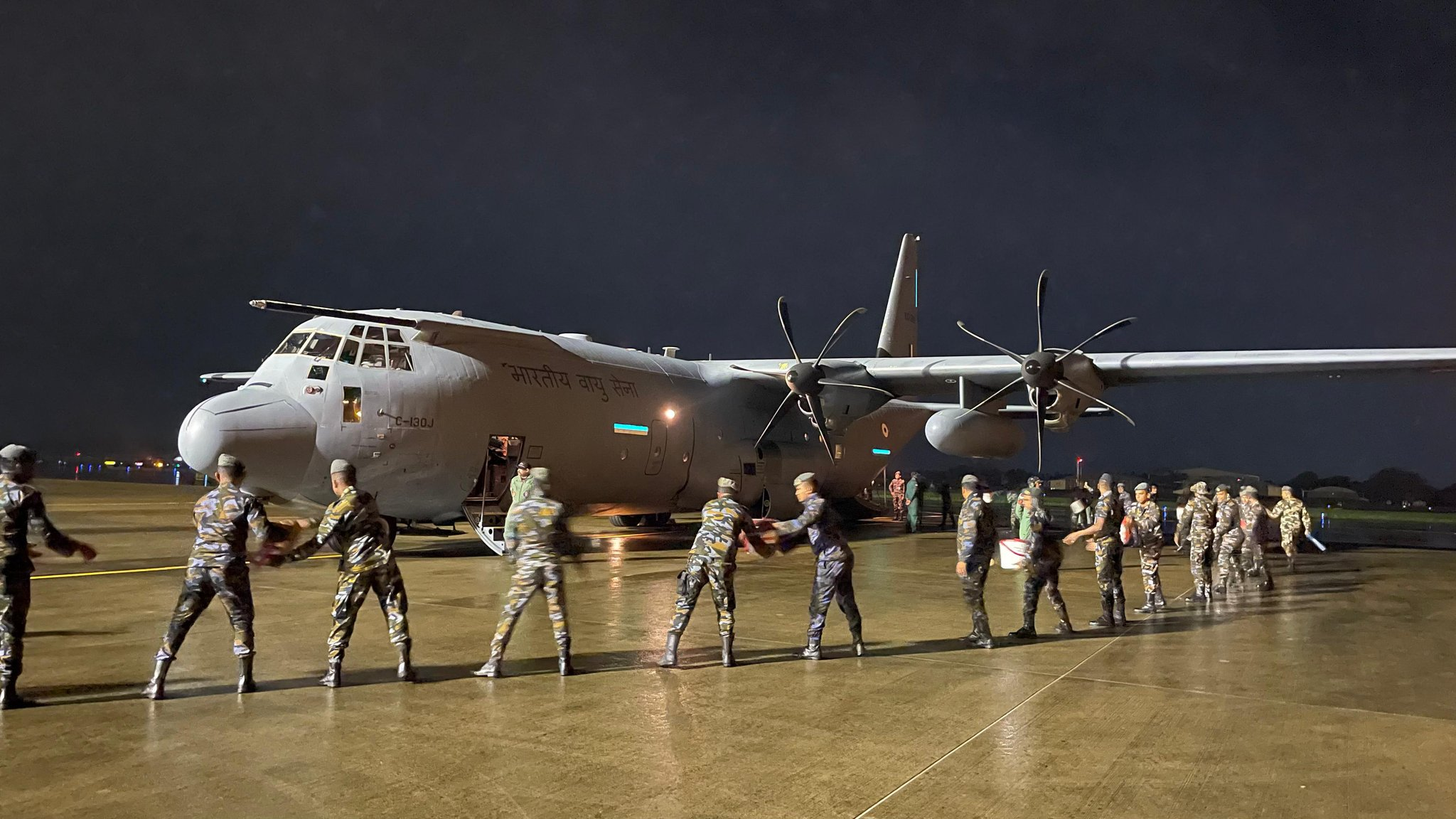
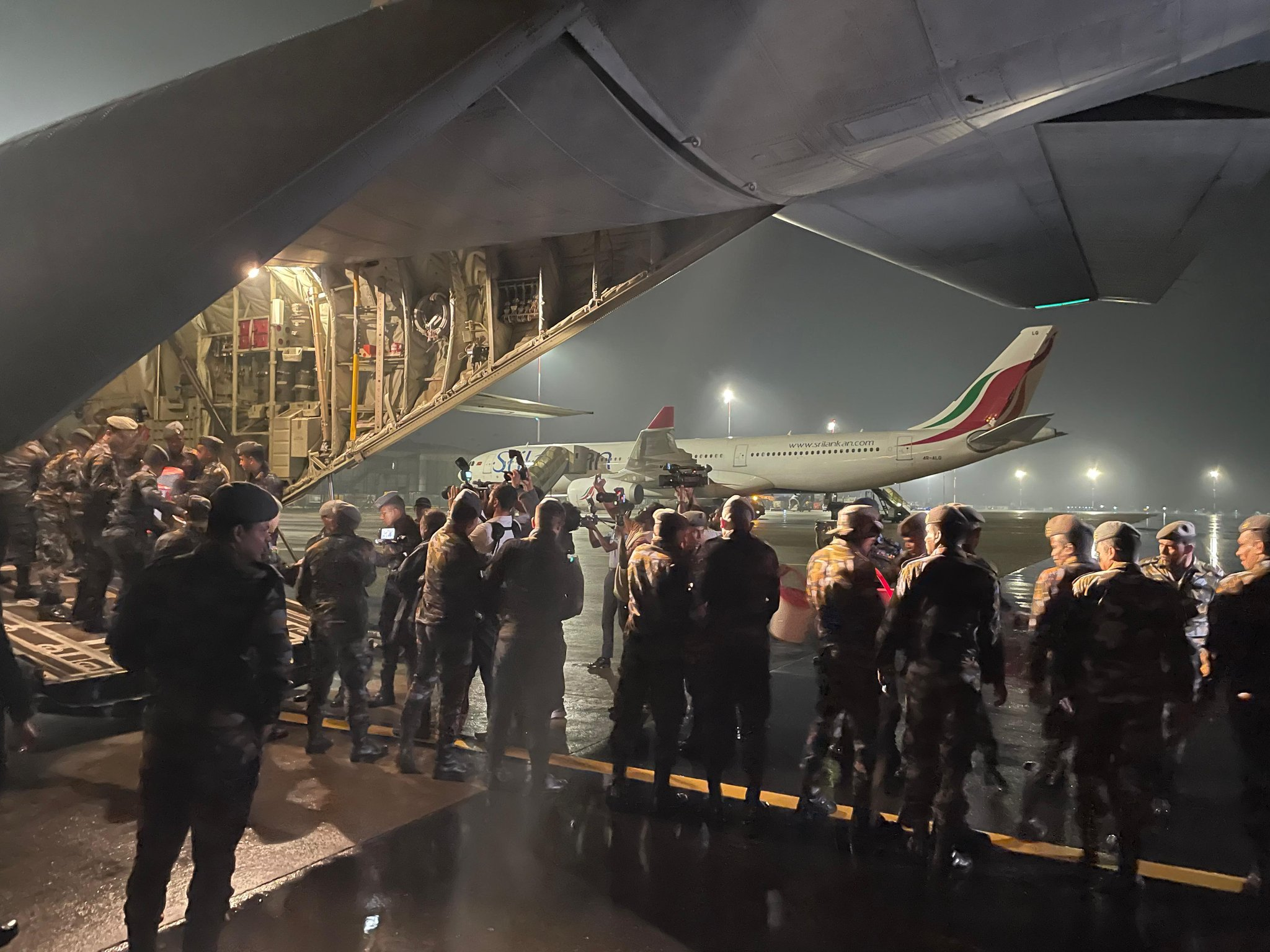
Indian Air Force Il-76MD and C-130J aircraft preparing for relief operations in Sri Lanka

On 28 November, India launched Operation Sagar Bandhu, a Humanitarian Assistance and Disaster Relief (HADR) mission to support Sri Lanka following the devastating Cyclone Ditwah.

- On the first day itself, the Indian Navy mobilised its aircraft carrier, INS Vikrant, and frigate, INS Udaygiri, which were already in Port of Colombo for the International Fleet Review 2025. Two ship-borne Chetak helicopters were also deployed for aerial reconnaissance during search & rescue. The ships delivered 9.5 tons of emergency dry rations.
- On 29 November, at 10 am local time, a C-130J aircraft of the Indian Air Force supplied 12 tonnes of materials. Later, an Il-76 aircraft transported further 9 tonnes of relief material with a complement of over 80 personnel from the National Disaster Response Force (NDRF) with four search-and-rescue dogs, and 8 tonnes of specialised equipment. Both the airlifters were dispatched from the Hindan Air Force Station.
- Additionally, two IAF Mi-17 helicopters were deployed in Sri Lanka for over a week. The helicopters delivered 8 tonnes of relief materials and operated daily for search and rescue operations.
- On 30 November, another C-130J landed in Colombo taking the total relief materials airlifted to 31.5 tonnes and overall relief materials transferred to 53 tonnes.
- On 1 December, INS Sukanya, a patrol vessel, reached Trincomalee to supply 12 tonnes of relief materials.
- On 2 December, one of the IAF's C-17 Globemaster transported two fully equipped field hospitals along with two BHISHM Modular Trauma Cubes to Colombo Airport which were set up in Mahiyangana and Welimada. They are being served by 73 professionals from the Shatrujeet Brigade including doctors and physicians among others. So far, the two IAF Mi-17 helicopters evacuated 65 survivors while the NDRF rescued 43 people.
- On 6 December, three Mk. IV LCUs including LCU 51, LCU 54 and LCU 57, carrying 352 tons of relief material, were dispatched from India's Tuticorin and arrived in Colombo on 7 December.
- On 7 December, INS Gharial, carrying 645 tons of relief material, was dispatched from India's Chennai and arrived in Trincomalee on 8 December.
- Between 3 and 9 December, four modular bailey bridge systems were airlifted by four C-17 Golbemaster airlifters to Sri Lanka to ensure rapid and critical connectivity in landslide and flood-affected regions. The last one took off from the Pathankot Air Force Station at 0900 IST.
- By 8 December, the Indian Army's Engineer Task Force (ETF) begun retrieval of the damaged Puliyampokkanai Bridge and a 120 ft (37 m) dual carriageway in Jaffna, using a wheeled excavator to support Sri Lanka’s Road Development Authority (RDA). The first bailey bridge likely to be launched by 13 December. Another such bridge has also reached Chilaw. Additionally, the ETF is also rebuilding the A35 road in Kilinochchi along with Sri Lanka Engineers.
- On 17 January 2026, the ETF completed the installation of a third 120 ft (37 m) bailey bridge at KM 15 on the B-492 highway located in the Central Province. This will connect the Nuwara Eliya and Kandy region. The earlier bridges were employed in the Jaffna and Kandy districts.
- On 6 February, the Indian Army and the Indian Navy, in partnership with Garden Reach Shipbuilders & Engineers, delivered 10 extra-wide modular bailey bridge systems onboard INS Gharial. The Indian Army and Sri Lanka’s Road Development Authority are undertaking damage assessment for seven critical bridge sites across Central, Uva and Sabaragamuwa Province.

== Records and statistics ==
United Nations agencies and the IFRC characterised the flooding and landslides associated with Ditwah as among the worst disasters to affect Sri Lanka in recent decades, with between one and 1.5 million people impacted across the country. The catastrophe prompted large-scale evacuations, the opening of more than 1,500 emergency shelters, and multiple rounds of international appeals for relief and early recovery support.

== See also ==
- Cyclone Nisha (2008)
- Tropical cyclones in 2025
- Tropical cyclones in India
- Tropical cyclones in Sri Lanka
- Weather of 2025
