= Palkumbura =

Palkumbura may refer to:

- Palkumbura (Udunuwara Divisional Secretariat), a village in Kandy District, Central Province, Sri Lanka
- Palkumbura (Yatinuwara Divisional Secretariat), a village in Kandy District, Central Province, Sri Lanka
