= Tropical cyclones in Sri Lanka =

Sri Lanka is an island nation in the Indian Ocean. The country is vulnerable to cyclones due to its position near the confluence of the Arabian Sea, the Bay of Bengal and the Indian Ocean.

== List of storms ==
| Name | Lowest Pressure (hPa) | Year | Image | Refs |
|---|---|---|---|---|
| Raweswaram | 970 | 1964 | | |
| 04B | 938 | 1978 | | |
| BOB 07 | 988 | 1992 | | |
| BOB 01 | 972 | 1998 | | |
| BOB 06 | 970 | 2000 | | |
| Fanoos | 998 | 2005 | | |
| Ogni | 988 | 2006 | | |
| Nisha | 996 | 2008 | | |
| Ward | 996 | 2009 | | |
| Nilam | 992 | 2012 | | |
| Viyaru | 990 | 2013 | | |
| Madi | 986 | 2013 | | |
| Roanu | 983 | 2016 | | |
| Nada | 1000 | 2016 | | |
| Burevi | 996 | 2020 | | |
| Ditwah | 986 | 2025 | Cyclone_Ditwah | |
