= Palkumbura (Udunuwara Divisional Secretariat) =

- Village
- Country: Sri Lanka
- Province: Central Province
- District: Kandy District
- Divisional secretariat: Udunuwara
- Time zone: UTC+5:30 (Sri Lanka Standard Time)

Palkumbura is a village in Kandy District, Central Province, Sri Lanka. It is located within Udunuwara Divisional Secretariat.

== Demographics ==
Historical population
Year	Pop.	±%
1881	41	—
1891	39	−4.9%
