= Ambuluwawa tower =

Multi-religious temple complex located in Gampola

Ambuluwawa Tower
- අම්බුළුවාව කුළුණ
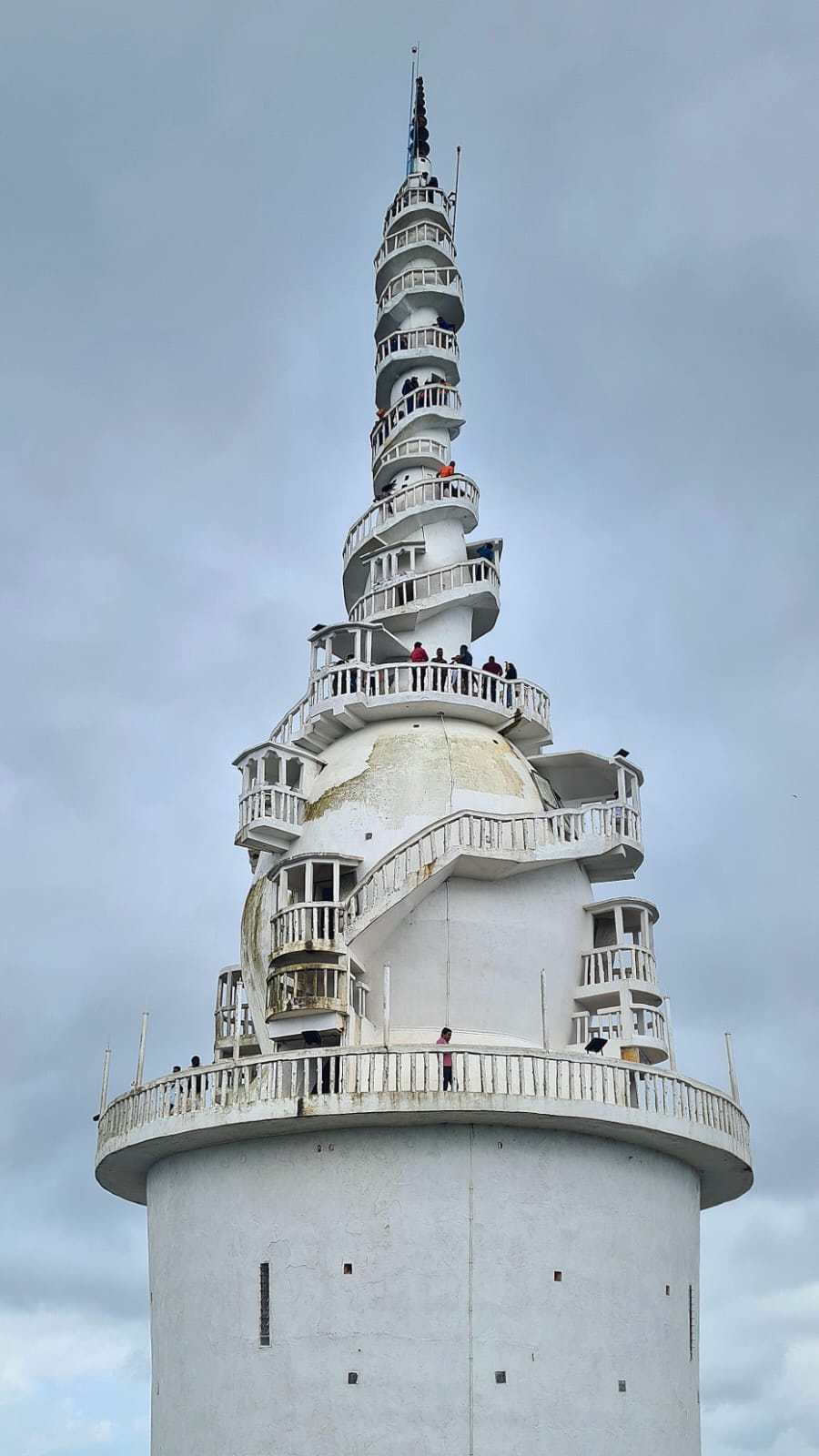
- Ambuluwawa Tower

- Location in Sri Lanka

Religion
- Affiliation: Buddhism, Christianity, Islam, Hinduism other_info =: Sect: [[{{{sect}}}]]

Location
- Location: Gampola, Sri Lanka
- Country: Sri Lanka
- Interactive map of Ambuluwawa Tower
- Coordinates: 7°9′41″N 80°32′50″E

Architecture
- Completed: 1997

Website
- https://ambuluwawa.com/

Ambuluwawa Tower (Sinhala: අම්බුළුවාව), part of the Ambuluwawa Biodiversity Complex, is a multi-religious temple complex located in Gampola, in Sri Lanka’s Central Province.

== Location ==
Ambuluwawa is situated approximately 5 km from Gampola town in Kandy District. The temple complex lies on Ambuluwawa mountain peak, which rises about 1,965 feet (599 m) above sea level. From the summit, visitors can enjoy 360-degree views of the central highlands, including the Knuckles Mountain Range, Adam’s Peak, and the Hanthana Range.

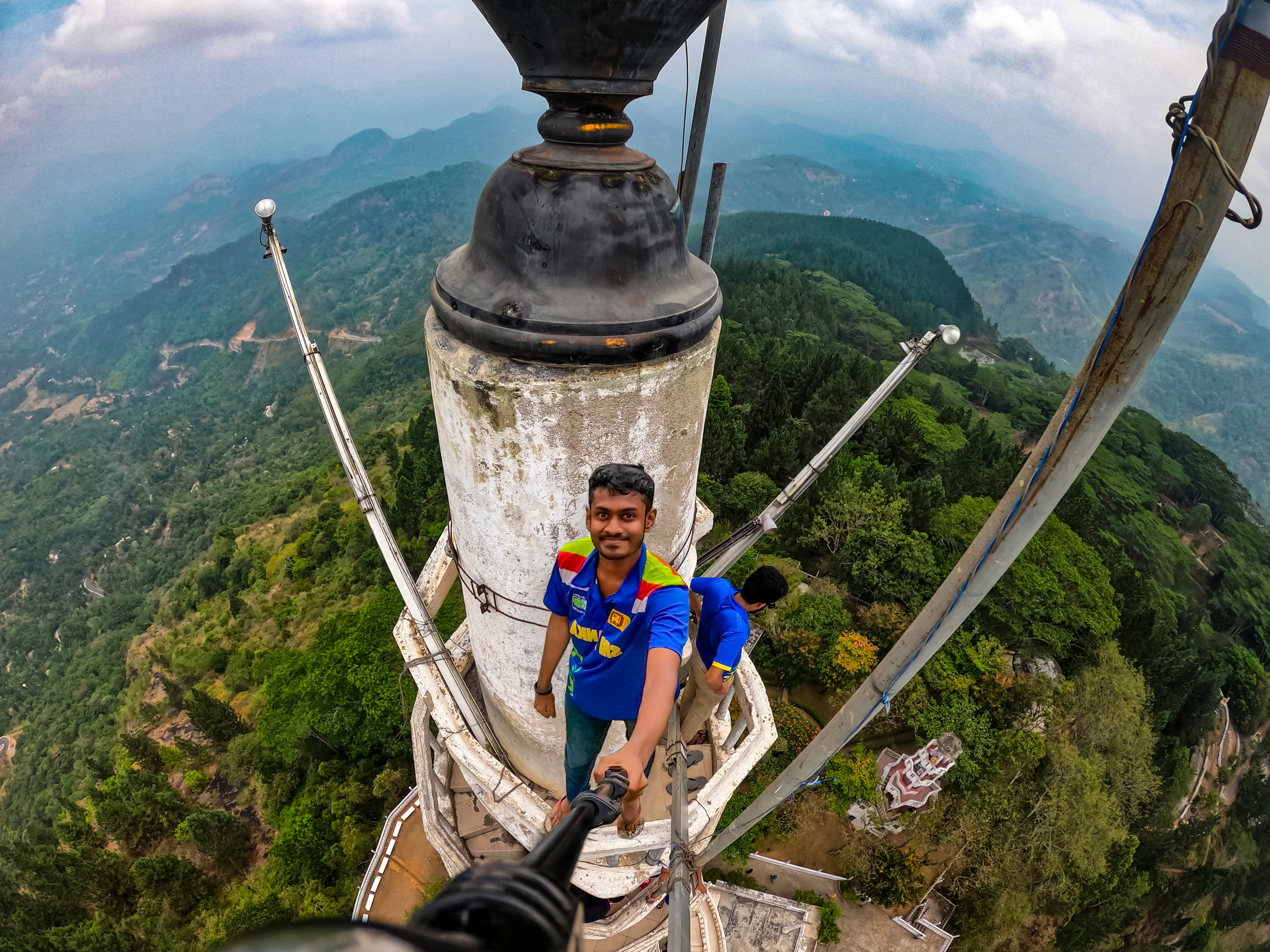
View from the top

== History ==
The origins of Ambuluwawa are linked to King Buvanekabahu IV of Gampola (1341–1351), who established Gampola as the capital of the island during his reign, and historical sources suggest that the kings of the Gampola Kingdom had a royal palace at the base of Ambuluwawa Hill, in what is today the village of Godagama. The hill is believed to have functioned as a strategic defensive fortification for the kingdom.

While the current temple complex is a more recent construction, it is inspired by the region’s ancient cultural and religious history. Local poems and legends commemorate the significance of the site, describing it as a place that unites spirituality, culture, and nature.

After the British annexation of the Kingdom of Kandy in 1815, much of the historical infrastructure in the Gampola region was destroyed, and the land was repurposed for coffee cultivation. Ambuluwawa Hill, however, remained largely unaffected due to its rocky terrain.

In 1997, D. M. Jayaratne, then Minister of Agriculture Lands and Forestry, along with several collaborators, undertook the project to develop access to Ambuluwawa Hill. The access road was initiated on 27 March 1997, and construction and development continued in subsequent years.

The Ambuluwawa complex now covers approximately 457 acres and features around 65 structures designed to combine architectural, technical, and engineering expertise. The site is intended to promote spiritual well-being, education, and public enjoyment.

== Religious and cultural significance ==
Ambuluwawa is notable for its multi-religious symbolism. The main Buddhist stupa is accompanied by a Hindu kovil, a Christian chapel, and an Islamic mosque within the same complex. This unique assembly of religious structures symbolizes Sri Lanka’s cultural and religious diversity and promotes interfaith harmony.

One of the prominent features of the complex is a stupa, standing 223 feet high, dedicated as a tribute to Sri Lanka’s traditional farming communities. The stupa’s design incorporates symbolic elements representing different groups of farmers: the base resembles a rice grain, the second layer represents vegetable farmers, and the third layer represents fruit farmers. The fourth section houses sacred relics, with the pinnacle topped by a "kiri danda" (a symbolic finial). A Bodhi tree, sourced from the historic Sri Maha Bodhi in Anuradhapura, is planted at the front of the stupa.

The complex also includes an observatory tower for night sky observation, primarily intended for students. Other features include a replica of Adam's Peak (Sri Pada) and viewing platforms that offer panoramic views of the surrounding hills. The site incorporates meditation areas, pathways, and facilities for spiritual practice.

== Architecture ==
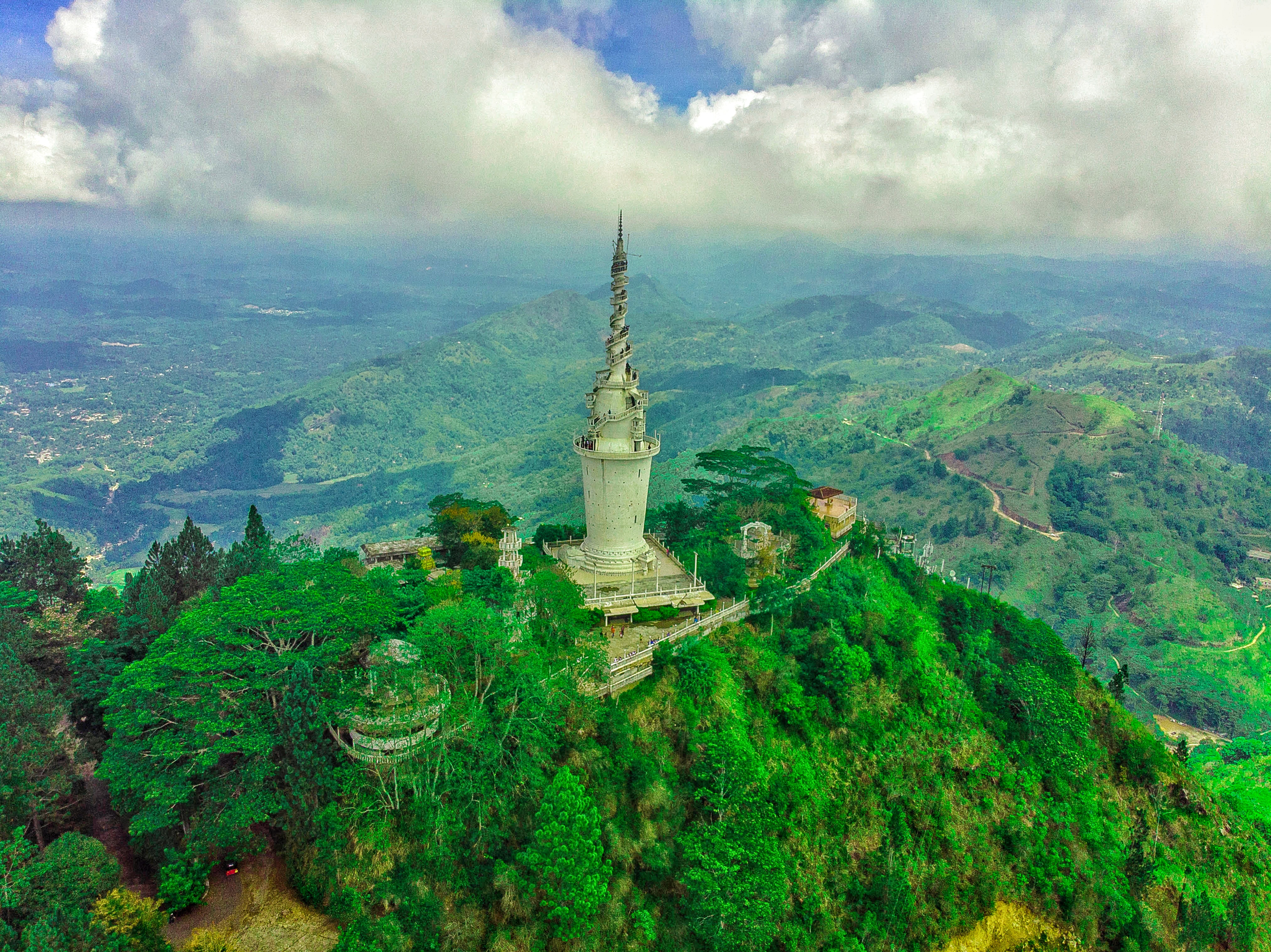
Overview

The most iconic structure at Ambuluwawa is its white spiraling tower, often referred to as the Ambuluwawa Tower. The tower features a narrow spiral staircase that ascends to observation platforms at different levels. From these points, visitors can view the surrounding valleys, rivers, and mountain ranges. The design of the tower, combined with manicured gardens, ponds, and surrounding structures such as a bell tower, reflects both modern and traditional Sri Lankan architectural styles.

== Natural environs ==
Ambuluwawa is also recognized as a biodiversity complex. The region features an inselberg geological formation that is resistant to erosion. Due to Sri Lanka’s heavy rainfall and fertile conditions, the mountain and its surroundings are home to a wide variety of flora. The biodiversity park surrounding the temple protects several rare and endemic plant species, making the site a blend of cultural and ecological heritage.

== Tourism ==
Ambuluwawa is a popular tourist destination for both local and international visitors. The ascent to the tower is considered adventurous, as the staircase narrows toward the top, offering thrilling but challenging climbs. The panoramic views from the summit are regarded as some of the most scenic in Sri Lanka. Tourists also explore the landscaped gardens, ponds, and religious monuments around the complex.

== Access ==
The site is accessible via road from Gampola town, with parking facilities available near the base of the complex. Visitors typically spend 2–3 hours exploring the site. The climb to the tower is physically demanding and may not be suitable for those with limited mobility.

== Development ==
In recent years, plans have been made to build a cable car at Ambuluwawa to improve tourist access and enhance the visitor experience. Excavation works have already begun in the first phase, including the creation of an 18 m deep trench at the peak. However, reports suggest that heavy machinery (five excavators) has been deployed without securing all the necessary environmental and geological permits. The initial phase is estimated to cost approximately 1.2 billion Sri Lankan rupees, with funding proposed from international and local firms. However, the project has raised concerns among local authorities regarding regulatory compliance.
