= Gelioya =

Gelioya ගෙළිඔය
- City
- Country: Sri Lanka
- Province: Central Province
- Time zone: UTC+5:30 (Sri Lanka Standard Time)

Gelioya (Sinhala: ගෙළිඔය) is a town located in Udunuwara Divisional Secretariat, Kandy District, Central Province, Sri Lanka. It is situated approximately 14 kilometers east of Kandy, the district capital.

== History ==
The history of Gelioya dates back to the ancient Kingdom of Kandy, where it served as a strategic location for military operations. During the British colonial era, Gelioya was a hub of coffee plantations. Today, the town has developed into an urban center with a diverse population and a thriving economy.

== Tourism ==
Gelioya is destination for travelers who wish to experience the natural environment of Sri Lanka. The town is surrounded by green hills, several waterfalls and tea plantations. One of the main attractions of Gelioya is the Ramboda Falls, a waterfall that cascades from a height of over 100 meters. Also nearby is the Udawatta Kele Sanctuary, a protected forest reserve that is home to a variety of wildlife and plant species.

== Culture ==
Gelioya has numerous temples, shrines and traditional festivals. One of the most famous temples in Gelioya is the Sri Muthumariamman Kovil, a Hindu temple dedicated to the goddess Mariamman. The temple attracts devotees from all over Sri Lanka, who come to offer prayers and seek blessings.

Another cultural event in Gelioya is the annual Perahera, a colorful parade that takes place during the Esala festival in July or August. The Perahera features traditional dancers, drummers, and elephants adorned with colorful decorations, and is an attraction for tourists and locals alike.

== Economy ==
Gelioya's economy is driven by agriculture, with tea and spice plantations being the main sources of income for local residents. In recent years, the town has also seen a rise in tourism. As a result, Gelioya has witnessed an increase in the hospitality and service sectors, with new hotels, restaurants, and tourist facilities opening up to meet the demand.

== Infrastructure ==
Gelioya has good road connectivity and access to basic amenities such as healthcare, education, and banking facilities. The town has several schools, including Gelioya Central College and St. Anthony's College, as well as a number of government hospitals and private clinics.

Karamada gelioya
