= Angunawela =

Coordinates: 7°14′N 80°35′E

Angunawela/Angunawala
- Village/ Family / Walauwa
- Interactive map of Angunawela/Angunawala
- Country: Sri Lanka
- Province: Central Province
- Time zone: UTC+5:30 (Sri Lanka Standard Time)

Angunawela/Angunawala is a village in Sri Lanka's Central Province. It used to be the home of the Angunawela/Angunawala Walauwa and for the prominent Radala members of the Angunawela/Angunawala Family hailing from the Kandyan Kingdom.

== See also ==
- List of towns in Central Province, Sri Lanka
