= Hepana =

Coordinates: 7°14′N 80°33′E

- Village
- Interactive map of Hepana
- Country: Sri Lanka
- Province: Central Province
- District: Kandy District
- Divisional Secretariat: Udunuwara Divisional Secretariat
- Time zone: UTC+5:30 (Sri Lanka Standard Time)

Hepana is a village in Sri Lanka which is located within Central Province in the centre of the country, 80 kilometres from Colombo. It is located within the Division Secretariat of Undunuwara which is a subdivision of the larger Kandy District.

== See also ==
- List of towns in Central Province, Sri Lanka
