= Kotakedeniya =

Coordinates: 7°12′N 80°36′E

- Village
- Interactive map of Kotakedeniya
- Country: Sri Lanka
- Province: Central Province
- Time zone: UTC+5:30 (Sri Lanka Standard Time)

Kotakedeniya is a village in Sri Lanka. It is located within Central Province.

== See also ==
- List of towns in Central Province, Sri Lanka
