= Pitunugama =

Coordinates: 7°12′N 80°36′E

- Village
- Interactive map of Pitunugama
- Country: Sri Lanka
- Province: Central Province
- Time zone: UTC+5:30 (Sri Lanka Standard Time)

Pitunugama is a village in Sri Lanka. It is located within Central Province and a locality in the city of Kandy. Pitunugama is also known as "Chandi Wattha" which translates as Land of Braves.

== See also ==
- List of towns in Central Province, Sri Lanka
