= Palle Aludeniya =

Coordinates: 7°13′N 80°36′E

- Village
- Interactive map of Palle Aludeniya
- Country: Sri Lanka
- Province: Central Province
- Time zone: UTC+5:30 (Sri Lanka Standard Time)

Palle Aludeniya is a village in Sri Lanka, located within Central Province.

== See also ==
- List of towns in Central Province, Sri Lanka
