= Rammalaka =

- Village
- Location of Rammalaka within Sri Lanka
- Coordinates: 7°15′N 80°32′E
- Country: Sri Lanka
- Province: Central Province
- Time zone: UTC+5:30 (Sri Lanka Standard Time)

Rammalaka is a village in Sri Lanka. It is located within Central Province.

== See also ==
- List of towns in Central Province, Sri Lanka
