= Ulakkonde =

Coordinates: 7°13′N 80°35′E

- Village
- Interactive map of Ulakkonde
- Country: Sri Lanka
- Province: Central Province
- Time zone: UTC+5:30 (Sri Lanka Standard Time)

Ulakkonde is a village in Sri Lanka. It is located within Central Province.It is in the Udunuwara constiuancy most of the inhabitants are sinhalese it is from 12 kilometers from Kandy town

== See also ==
- List of towns in Central Province, Sri Lanka
