= Meddegoda =

- Village
- Interactive map of Meddegoda
- Country: Sri Lanka
- Province: Central Province
- Time zone: UTC+5:30 (Sri Lanka Standard Time)

Meddegoda is a village in Sri Lanka. It is located within Western province, at a distance of 17 km from Colombo.

== See also ==
- List of towns in Central Province, Sri Lanka
