= Udunuwara Polling Division =

Udunuwara
- Polling Division
- Coordinates: 7.218960°N 80.557775°E
- Country: Sri Lanka
- Province: Central Province, Sri Lanka
- Electoral District: Kandy

Area
  - Total: 68.0 km^{2} (26.3 sq mi)

Population (2012)
  - Total: 110,905
  - Density: 1,631/km^{2} (4,220/sq mi)
- ISO 3166 code: EC-04K

The Udunuwara Polling Division is a Polling Division in the Kandy Electoral District, in the Central Province, Sri Lanka.

== Presidential election results ==
=== Summary ===
The winner of Udunuwara has matched the final country result 7 out of 9 times. Hence, Udunuwara is a weak bellwether for presidential elections.

Year	Udunuwara	Kandy	MAE %	Sri Lanka	MAE %
2024	Dissanayake	Dissanayake	%	Dissanayake	%
2019	Premadasa	Rajapaksa	2.85%	Rajapaksa	4.90%
2015	Sirisena	Sirisena	4.08%	Sirisena	7.35%
2010	Rajapaksa	Rajapaksa	3.23%	Rajapaksa	6.88%
2005	Wickremesinghe	Wickremesinghe	2.52%	Rajapaksa	8.40%
1999	Kumaratunga	Kumaratunga	2.21%	Kumaratunga	3.68%
1994	Kumaratunga	Kumaratunga	0.47%	Kumaratunga	5.12%
1988	Premadasa	Premadasa	5.60%	Premadasa	8.40%
1982	Jayawardene	Jayawardene	3.94%	Jayawardene	8.37%
Matches/Mean MAE	7/9	8/9	3.11%	9/9	6.64%

=== 2024 Sri Lankan presidential election ===
Candidate	Udunuwara		Kandy		Sri Lanka	
Candidate	Votes	%	Votes	%	Votes	%
Anura Kumara Dissanayake	33,232	46.92%	394,534	42.46%	5,634,915	42.31%
Sajith Premadasa	23,326	32.93%	323,998	34.71%	4,363,035	32.76%
Ranil Wickremesinghe	10,383	14.66%	162,707	17.43%	2,299,767	17.27%
Namal Rajapaksa	1,367	1.93%	19,403	2.08%	342,781	2.57%
Dilith Jayaweera	845	1.19%	9,098	0.97%	122,396	0.92%
Others	1,593	2.37%	23,776	2.55%	556,722	4.18%
Valid Votes	70,827	97.83%	933,516	97.48%	13,319,616	97.80%
Rejected Votes	1,573	2.17%	24,153	2.52%	300,300	2.20%
Total Polled	72,400	80.52%	957,669	80.38%	13,619,916	79.46%
Registered Electors	89,918		1,191,399		17,140,354	

=== 2019 Sri Lankan presidential election ===
Party	Udunuwara		Kandy		Sri Lanka	
Party	Votes	%	Votes	%	Votes	%
Sajith Premadasa	33,131	47.60%	417,355	44.64%	5,564,239	41.99%
Gotabaya Rajapaksa	33,003	47.41%	471,502	50.43%	6,924,255	52.25%
Anura Kumara Dissanayake	1,913	2.75%	23,539	2.52%	418,553	3.16%
Others	1,560	2.24%	22,479	2.40%	345,452	2.61%
Valid Votes	69,607	99.20%	934,875	99.04%	13,252,499	98.99%
Rejected Votes	563	0.80%	9,020	0.96%	135,452	1.01%
Total Polled	70,170	84.70%	943,895	84.89%	13,387,951	83.71%
Registered Electors	82,842		1,111,860		15,992,568	

=== 2015 Sri Lankan presidential election ===
Party	Udunuwara		Kandy		Sri Lanka	
Party	Votes	%	Votes	%	Votes	%
Maithripala Sirisena	38,018	58.71%	466,994	54.56%	6,217,162	51.28%
Mahinda Rajapaksa	25,984	40.13%	378,585	44.23%	5,768,090	47.58%
Others	752	1.16%	10,329	1.21%	138,200	1.14%
Valid Votes	64,754	98.84%	855,908	98.73%	12,123,452	98.85%
Rejected Votes	763	1.16%	10,993	1.27%	140,925	1.15%
Total Polled	65,517	79.61%	866,901	79.71%	12,264,377	78.69%
Registered Electors	82,298		1,087,542		15,585,942	

=== 2010 Sri Lankan presidential election ===
Party	Udunuwara		Kandy		Sri Lanka	
Party	Votes	%	Votes	%	Votes	%
Mahinda Rajapaksa	29,235	50.88%	406,636	54.16%	6,015,934	57.88%
Sarath Fonseka	27,123	47.21%	329,492	43.89%	4,173,185	40.15%
Others	1,096	1.91%	14,658	1.95%	204,494	1.97%
Valid Votes	57,454	98.91%	750,786	98.85%	10,393,613	99.03%
Rejected Votes	631	1.09%	8,700	1.15%	101,838	0.97%
Total Polled	58,085	75.62%	759,486	75.87%	10,495,451	66.70%
Registered Electors	76,812		1,001,074		15,734,587	

=== 2005 Sri Lankan presidential election ===
Party	Udunuwara		Kandy		Sri Lanka	
Party	Votes	%	Votes	%	Votes	%
Ranil Wickremesinghe	30,979	56.90%	387,150	54.33%	4,706,366	48.43%
Mahinda Rajapaksa	22,733	41.75%	315,672	44.30%	4,887,152	50.29%
Others	733	1.35%	9,798	1.37%	123,521	1.27%
Valid Votes	54,445	98.68%	712,620	98.64%	9,717,039	98.88%
Rejected Votes	726	1.32%	9,817	1.36%	109,869	1.12%
Total Polled	55,171	76.80%	722,437	77.37%	9,826,908	69.51%
Registered Electors	71,840		933,754		14,136,979	

=== 1999 Sri Lankan presidential election ===
Party	Udunuwara		Kandy		Sri Lanka	
Party	Votes	%	Votes	%	Votes	%
Chandrika Kumaratunga	22,192	47.86%	308,187	50.29%	4,312,157	51.12%
Ranil Wickremesinghe	21,920	47.27%	276,360	45.10%	3,602,748	42.71%
Nandana Gunathilake	1,199	2.59%	15,512	2.53%	343,927	4.08%
Others	1,061	2.29%	12,752	2.08%	176,679	2.09%
Valid Votes	46,372	97.47%	612,811	97.29%	8,435,754	97.69%
Rejected Votes	1,204	2.53%	17,060	2.71%	199,536	2.31%
Total Polled	47,576	76.13%	629,871	77.61%	8,635,290	72.17%
Registered Electors	62,497		811,606		11,965,536	

=== 1994 Sri Lankan presidential election ===
Party	Udunuwara		Kandy		Sri Lanka	
Party	Votes	%	Votes	%	Votes	%
Chandrika Kumaratunga	24,199	57.07%	320,110	56.64%	4,709,205	62.28%
Srima Dissanayake	17,442	41.14%	235,519	41.68%	2,715,283	35.91%
Others	758	1.79%	9,488	1.68%	137,040	1.81%
Valid Votes	42,399	97.82%	565,117	97.55%	7,561,526	98.03%
Rejected Votes	945	2.18%	14,179	2.45%	151,706	1.97%
Total Polled	43,344	76.48%	579,296	77.85%	7,713,232	69.12%
Registered Electors	56,671		744,151		11,158,880	

=== 1988 Sri Lankan presidential election ===
Party	Udunuwara		Kandy		Sri Lanka	
Party	Votes	%	Votes	%	Votes	%
Ranasinghe Premadasa	16,582	60.70%	234,124	54.88%	2,569,199	50.43%
Sirimavo Bandaranaike	10,420	38.14%	186,187	43.65%	2,289,857	44.95%
Ossie Abeygunasekera	315	1.15%	6,266	1.47%	235,701	4.63%
Valid Votes	27,317	98.03%	426,577	98.57%	5,094,754	98.24%
Rejected Votes	550	1.97%	6,167	1.43%	91,499	1.76%
Total Polled	27,867	55.49%	432,744	68.36%	5,186,256	55.87%
Registered Electors	50,223		633,030		9,283,143	

=== 1982 Sri Lankan presidential election ===
Party	Udunuwara		Kandy		Sri Lanka	
Party	Votes	%	Votes	%	Votes	%
J. R. Jayewardene	23,440	64.02%	289,621	59.80%	3,450,815	52.93%
Hector Kobbekaduwa	12,100	33.05%	178,647	36.89%	2,546,348	39.05%
Rohana Wijeweera	852	2.33%	12,493	2.58%	273,428	4.19%
Others	224	0.61%	3,536	0.73%	249,460	3.83%
Valid Votes	36,616	99.33%	484,297	99.07%	6,520,156	98.78%
Rejected Votes	246	0.67%	4,548	0.93%	80,470	1.22%
Total Polled	36,862	85.28%	488,845	89.44%	6,600,626	80.15%
Registered Electors	43,223		546,565		8,235,358	

== Parliamentary election results ==
=== Summary ===
The winner of Udunuwara has matched the final country result 6 out of 7 times. Hence, Udunuwara is a bellwether for parliamentary elections.

Year	Udunuwara	Kandy	MAE %	Sri Lanka	MAE %
2015	UNFGG	UNFGG	3.97%	UNFGG	9.70%
2010	UPFA	UPFA	1.06%	UPFA	2.30%
2004	UNF	UNF	1.88%	UPFA	4.50%
2001	UNF	UNF	5.48%	UNF	7.70%
2000	PA	PA	2.83%	PA	2.26%
1994	PA	UNP	2.99%	PA	2.38%
1989	UNP	UNP	5.25%	UNP	8.05%
Matches/Mean MAE	6/7	5/7	3.35%	7/7	5.27%

=== 2015 Sri Lankan parliamentary election ===
Party	Udunuwara		Kandy		Sri Lanka	
Party	Votes	%	Votes	%	Votes	%
UNFGG	35,580	59.99%	440,761	55.61%	5,098,916	45.77%
UPFA	20,808	35.08%	309,152	39.00%	4,732,664	42.48%
JVP	2,307	3.89%	30,669	3.87%	544,154	4.88%
Others	618	1.04%	12,055	1.52%	100,088	0.90%
Valid Votes	59,313	96.10%	792,637	95.48%	11,140,333	95.35%
Rejected Votes	2,365	3.83%	37,065	4.46%	516,926	4.42%
Total Polled	61,722	75.00%	830,165	79.13%	11,684,111	77.66%
Registered Electors	82,298		1,049,160		15,044,490	

=== 2010 Sri Lankan parliamentary election ===
Party	Udunuwara		Kandy		Sri Lanka	
Party	Votes	%	Votes	%	Votes	%
UPFA	26,154	59.69%	339,819	60.81%	4,846,388	60.38%
UNF	15,590	35.58%	192,798	34.50%	2,357,057	29.37%
DNA	1,949	4.45%	23,728	4.25%	441,251	5.50%
Others	120	0.27%	2,459	0.44%	30,354	0.38%
Valid Votes	43,813	91.50%	558,804	90.49%	8,026,322	96.03%
Rejected Votes	4,043	8.44%	58,333	9.45%	581,465	6.96%
Total Polled	47,882	62.34%	617,559	61.70%	8,358,246	59.29%
Registered Electors	76,812		1,000,861		14,097,690	

=== 2004 Sri Lankan parliamentary election ===
Party	Udunuwara		Kandy		Sri Lanka	
Party	Votes	%	Votes	%	Votes	%
UNF	23,413	47.63%	313,859	49.99%	3,486,792	37.73%
UPFA	21,739	44.23%	268,131	42.71%	4,223,126	45.70%
JHU	3,678	7.48%	42,192	6.72%	552,723	5.98%
Others	325	0.66%	3,684	0.59%	64,227	0.69%
Valid Votes	49,155	94.25%	627,866	93.24%	9,241,931	94.52%
Rejected Votes	2,999	5.75%	45,484	6.75%	534,452	5.47%
Total Polled	52,154	74.67%	673,380	76.47%	9,777,821	75.74%
Registered Electors	69,844		880,634		12,909,631	

=== 2001 Sri Lankan parliamentary election ===
Party	Udunuwara		Kandy		Sri Lanka	
Party	Votes	%	Votes	%	Votes	%
UNF	28,101	58.86%	314,297	52.77%	4,086,026	45.62%
PA	15,990	33.49%	233,637	39.23%	3,330,815	37.19%
JVP	2,859	5.99%	37,146	6.24%	815,353	9.10%
Others	793	1.66%	10,496	1.76%	129,347	1.44%
Valid Votes	47,743	93.96%	595,576	93.40%	8,955,844	94.77%
Rejected Votes	3,068	6.04%	42,103	6.60%	494,009	5.23%
Total Polled	50,811	77.15%	637,679	76.03%	9,449,878	76.03%
Registered Electors	65,863		838,687		12,428,762	

=== 2000 Sri Lankan parliamentary election ===
Party	Udunuwara		Kandy		Sri Lanka	
Party	Votes	%	Votes	%	Votes	%
PA	19,988	41.93%	282,282	46.66%	3,899,329	45.33%
UNP	19,591	41.10%	243,623	40.27%	3,451,765	40.12%
NUA	4,990	10.47%	32,023	5.29%	185,593	2.16%
JVP	1,698	3.56%	21,565	3.56%	518,725	6.03%
SU	731	1.53%	10,999	1.82%	127,859	1.49%
Others	674	1.41%	14,436	2.39%	161,809	1.88%
Valid Votes	47,672	N/A	604,928	N/A	8,602,617	N/A

=== 1994 Sri Lankan parliamentary election ===
Party	Udunuwara		Kandy		Sri Lanka	
Party	Votes	%	Votes	%	Votes	%
PA	21,635	49.23%	267,683	46.43%	3,887,805	48.94%
UNP	21,586	49.12%	301,824	52.35%	3,498,370	44.04%
Others	725	1.65%	7,045	1.22%	175,576	2.21%
Valid Votes	43,946	95.15%	576,552	94.89%	7,943,688	95.20%
Rejected Votes	2,238	4.85%	31,019	5.11%	400,395	4.80%
Total Polled	46,184	81.49%	607,571	81.67%	8,344,095	74.75%
Registered Electors	56,671		743,939		11,163,064	

=== 1989 Sri Lankan parliamentary election ===
Party	Udunuwara		Kandy		Sri Lanka	
Party	Votes	%	Votes	%	Votes	%
UNP	9,012	59.27%	204,973	61.72%	2,838,005	50.71%
SLFP	3,352	22.05%	105,977	31.91%	1,785,369	31.90%
SLMC	2,682	17.64%	14,697	4.43%	202,016	3.61%
Others	158	1.04%	6,462	1.95%	209,706	3.75%
Valid Votes	15,204	93.55%	332,109	93.69%	5,596,468	93.87%
Rejected Votes	1,048	6.45%	22,374	6.31%	365,563	6.13%
Total Polled	16,252	33.22%	354,483	56.42%	5,962,031	63.60%
Registered Electors	48,915		628,317		9,374,164	

== Demographics ==
=== Ethnicity ===
The Udunuwara Polling Division has a Sinhalese majority (72.7%) and a significant Moor population (24.4%) . In comparison, the Kandy Electoral District (which contains the Udunuwara Polling Division) has a Sinhalese majority (74.4%) and a significant Moor population (13.9%)

Ethnicity in Udunuwara
1. Sinhalese (72.7%)
2. Moor (24.4%)
3. Sri Lankan Tamil (1.90%)
4. Other (1.00%)

=== Religion ===
The Udunuwara Polling Division has a Buddhist majority (72.0%) and a significant Muslim population (24.5%) . In comparison, the Kandy Electoral District (which contains the Udunuwara Polling Division) has a Buddhist majority (73.4%) and a significant Muslim population (14.3%)

Religion in Udunuwara
1. Buddhist (72.0%)
2. Muslim (24.5%)
3. Hindu (2.30%)
4. Other (1.20%)
