= Angunawala =

Coordinates: 7°14′N 80°35′E

- Village/Family/Walauwa
- Interactive map of Angunawala
- Country: Sri Lanka
- Province: Central Province
- Time zone: UTC+5:30 (Sri Lanka Standard Time)

Angunawala is a village that lies in Sri Lanka's Central Province. It used to be the home of the Angunawala Walauwa and the prominent Radala members of the Angunawala Family hailing from the Kandyan Kingdom.

== See also ==
- List of towns in Central Province, Sri Lanka
