= Wahunkoho =

Wahunkoha Wahanga
- Village
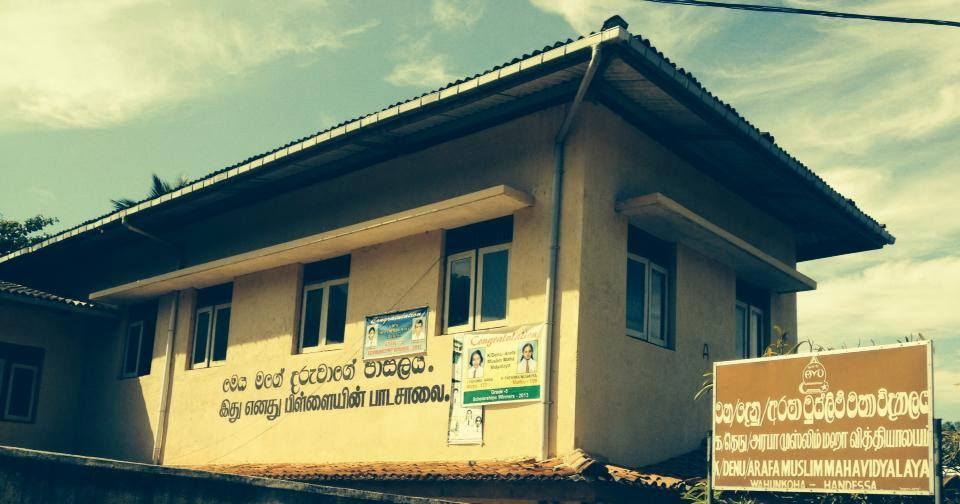
- Coordinates: 7°13′N 80°35′E
- Country: Sri Lanka
- Province: Central Province
- Time zone: UTC+5:30 (Sri Lanka Standard Time)

Wahunkoha is a village in Central Province, Sri Lanka. It is in the Udunuwara constituency, 2 kilometres (1.2 mi) from historic Embekka Devalaya.

Wahunkoha is served a Muslim Jummah mosque and Arafa Muslim Mahavidyalaya. The school is administered by the central provincial council. The inhabitants are Muslims; their forefathers migrated from coastal Sri Lanka during the Portuguese atrocities against the Muslims. The ruler of the Kandiyan Kingdom, King Senarath, settled and the stranded Muslims inhabited many parts of Sri Lanka.

== See also ==
- List of towns in Central Province, Sri Lanka
