= Archibald Campbell Lawrie =

British judge

Sir Archibald Campbell Lawrie
- Born: 8 September 1837; Glasgow, Scotland
- Died: 11 May 1914 (aged 76); Dumgoyne, Scotland
- Occupation: Judge

Sir Archibald Campbell Lawrie, FRCI (8 September 1837 – 11 May 1914) was a British judge in Ceylon and scholar of Scottish legal history.

== Biography ==
Lawrie was born in 1837, the son of Professor J. A. Lawrie, MD, of Glasgow University.

He was admitted to the Faculty of Advocates, and in 1872 was appointed a Judge of the District Court of Kandy, Ceylon. On 6 July 1892 he was appointed Senior Puisne Judge of the Supreme Court in British Ceylon. He retired in 1901, was appointed a knight Bachelor in the November 1901 Birthday Honours list, and received the knighthood from King Edward VII on 10 December 1901. In November 1901 he was elected a Fellow of the Royal Colonial Institute (FRCI).

Lawrie was a scholar of early Scottish history. In his early years in Scotland in the 1860s he was a contributor to the works of the legal historian Cosmo Innes. Returning to the United Kingdom after his years in Ceylon, he was an editor of early Scottish charters before 1153, and of three volumes of Scottish Acts of Parliament. In April 1905 he received the honorary degree Doctor of Laws (LL.D.) from the University of Glasgow

Moving to Dungoyne, Stirlingshire, on his retirement, he died there 11 May 1914.

== Family ==
Lawrie married, in 1880, Constance Dennistoun, daughter of John Dennistoun and widow of J. W. Hamilton. She died in 1890.

== Publications ==
- Early Scottish Charters, 1905
- Annals of the Reigns of Malcolm and William, Kings of Scotland, 1910

Gazetter of Central Province volumes 1and21896 & 1898
