= Census of Sri Lanka =

National government survey

- Frequency: Decennial
- Locations: Department of Census and Statistics, No. 306/71, Polduwa Road, Battaramulla, Western Province
- Country: Sri Lanka
- Inaugurated: March 27, 1871; 155 years ago
- Most recent: November 1, 2023; 3 years ago

The Census of Sri Lanka is a census held by the Department of Census and Statistics of the Government of Sri Lanka, traditionally taking place every 10 years. The first census of Sri Lanka was taken in 1871, making it the first country in South Asia to conduct a census. The most recent census took place in 2023, that followed the census in 2012, the first complete census in the country since 1981 due to disruptions from the Sri Lankan Civil War.

== History ==
The first census in Sri Lanka was held on 27 March 1871 and conducted by the Registrar General's Office, making it the first of any country in South Asia. It was conducted from then on every ten years.

The Census Department was created on 1 December 1944 for taking the Census of 1946, which was postponed from 1941 due to World War II. The Soulbury Constitution of 1947 combined the department with the Statistics Department to create the Department of Census and Statistics. The 1951 census was postponed to 1953 due to a shortage of paper, and the following was also postponed to 1963.

The 1991 census was not held due to the Sri Lankan Civil War (1983–2009), with areas in the Northern and Eastern Provinces controlled by the Tamil militant LTTE. The subsequent 2001 census covered 94% of the country, with no coverage in the Jaffna, Kilinochchi, and Mullaitivu Districts, and only partial coverage in the Vavuniya, Mannar, Batticaloa, and Trincomalee Districts. The following census was held in 2012.

The 2021 census was postponed due to the COVID-19 pandemic, and was started on 1 November 2023 to be completed on 31 January 2024.

== Summary ==
Total population in Sri Lanka
Year	Pop.	±% p.a.
1827 (Note: මුළු දිවයිනේම විද්‍යාත්මක නොවන සංගණනයක්.)	889,584	—
1871	2,400,380	+2.28%
1881	2,759,738	+1.40%
1891	3,007,789	+0.86%
1901	3,565,954	+1.72%
1911	4,106,350	+1.42%
1921	4,498,605	+0.92%
1931	5,306,871	+1.67%
1946	6,657,339	+1.52%
1953	8,097,895	+2.84%
1963	10,582,064	+2.71%
1971	12,689,897	+2.30%
1981	14,846,750	+1.58%
1990	17,325,773	+1.73%
2000	18,777,601	+0.81%
2012	20,359,439	+0.68%
2024	21,763,170	+0.56%
