= List of settlements in Uva Province =

Uva Province is a province of Sri Lanka, containing the Badulla District and Moneragala District. The following is a list of settlements in the province.

== A ==
Agalle, Agampodigama, Aggalaulpota, Akurukaduwa, Alakkangama, Alakolagalagama, Alakolawatta, Alanmulla, Alawatugoda, Alokkangama, Alpitiya, Alubogolla, Alugalge, Alugalge, Alugolla, Alukalawita, Aluketiyawa, Alulwela, Alupota, Alupota, Alupota, Alupota Town, Aluttarama, Alutwela, Alutwela, Alutwela, Alutwelagama, Alutwewa, Amarakonegama, Amarakongama, Ambadandegama, Ambagahakandura, Ambagasdowa, Ambagasduwa, Ambagolla, Ambagolla, Ambagolle, Ambalanda, Ambalande, Ambamulla, Ambanporuwa, Ambatenna, Ampitiya, Amunekandura, Amunumulla, Amunumulla, Anda Ulpota, Andampohuwa, Andanpahura, Andaulpotagama, Andawalagama, Andawalayaya, Andawelagama, Andawelayaya, Andeniya, Andiawela, Angoda, Angunakolapelessa, Ankada, Aralupitiya, Aralutalawa, Araluwinna, Aratumedilla, Aravakumbura, Aravawatte, Arawa, Arawakumbura, Arawatta, Asweddumegama, Asweddummulla, Asweddumwelagama, Atale, Athimale Colony, Attambagaskandura, Attanagola, Attanagolla, Ayiwela

== B ==
Badalagammana, Badalkumbura, Badaweltota, Badulla, Badullagasgedara, Baduludena, Badulugasgedara, Badulupitiyagama, Baduluwela, Bakinidandugolla, Bakinidandugollegama, Bakinigahapitiya, Bakinigahawela, Bakinigahawela Vidiya, Bakinilanda, Bakinipitiya, Bakmilande, Bala-at-tare, Bala-attara, Baladangolla, Balagala, Balagalla, Balagolla, Balaharuwa, Balana, Balanegama, Balewela, Ballakatuwa, Bambaragahaulpota, Bambaragama, Bambaragasyaya, Bandarawadiya, Bandarawatta, Bandarawela, Barawaya, Batagammana, Baththewa, Batugammana, Batwewa, Beddegama, Beddekumbura, Beligalla, Bendiyawa, Beraliyapola, Beramada, Bibila, Bibilagama, Bibile, Bibilegama, Bibilemulla, Bindunawewa, Bindunuwewa, Bingoda, Biriulpota, Bodagama, Bogahakivula, Bogahakumbura, Bogahapatana, Bogahapelessa, Bogahawela, Bogandena, Bogoda, Bohitiya, Bokagonna, Bokanoruwa, Bolgalla, Bolgalle, Boliyadda, Bolyadda, Bootagolla, Bopattakivula, Bopattakiwula, Bopitiya, Boragas, Boragasketiya, Boragoda Vidiya, Boralanda, Bowela, Bubula, Buddama, Budugakanda, Budurapota, Bulathwatta, Bulatwatta, Bulatwelgoda, Bulliyadda, Bulugahadena, Bulugahalanda, Bulupitiya, Bummane, Butagolla, Buttala

== D ==
Dadayampola, Dadayantalawa, Dahagoniya, Dalohogalla, Damanegama, Damanwara, Dambagahamaditta, Dambagahapattiya, Dambagahapitiya, Dambagahawela, Dambagalla, Dambakota, Dambawelagama, Dambawinna, Dambewela, Damunuwinna, Danagirigama, Dandugala, Dandugalla, Danigala, Daragala, Darkumbura, Davuldena, Dawatagolla, Dawategama, Debara Ara, Debedda, Debeddekiula, Deekiligolla, Degalaramba, Dehiattawala, Dehiatteyaya, Dehigama, Dehigolla, Dehikinda, Dehipola, Dehivinna, Deliwa, Dematan-Ella, Dematapelessa, Demettanella, Demodara, Demoderawatta, Denagiriya, Detagamuwa, Dewatagolla, Dewatura, Dewitotawela, Deyiyannewela, Diganatenna, Dijjulana, Dikirigolla, Dikkapitiya, Dikwella, Dikwellagama, Dikyaya, Dimbulamura, Dimbulana, Dimbulgahagedara, Divitotawela, Diwulgahagedara, Diyabetma, Diyabetme, Diyabokandura, Diyakola, Diyaluma, Diyaluwa, Diyapola, Diyatalawa, Dodan Atulpota, Dodanetulpota, Dodangolla, Dombagahawela, Doolalinda, Doragoda-arawa, Dorapoda, Dulalinda, Dultota, Dumbana, Dummalatenna, Dunikiyana, Dunukewela, Dunukeyana, Dunumewa

== E ==
Edandewela, Edandupola, Egalla, Egodagama, Egodakotagama, Egodamulla, Ehalagahawadiya, Ekeriyankumbura, Ekeriyawatta, Ekiriya, Ekiriyankumbura, Ekiriyawatta, Ekriyankumbura, Elamalpota, Elandagoda, Elewala, Elewela, Ella, Ella Town, Ella-alutwela, Ellagama, Ellanda, Ellande, Ellatota, Ellealutwela, Ellegama, Ellegama, Ellekona, Elletota, Elwatta, Elwatta, Elwatta, Embilipitiya, Erabadda, Erabaddegama, Etagama, Etakumbura, Etambagaskandura, Etanamada, Etandagoda, Etiliwewa, Etimale, Etimole, Etimole, Etimole Colony, Etkandawaka, Etpattiya, Ettalapitiya, Ettalawela, Ettampitiya, Ettampitiya Town, Ettanipitiya, Ewariyapelassa, Ewariyapelessa

== G ==
Gabadagoda, Gadadehigolla, Gal Oya, Galabedda, Galagediyaya, Galahitiyawa, Galakulugolla, Galanda, Galanihegama, Galapitakanda, Galauda, Galawadiya, Galbokka, Galbokkegama, Galewadiya, Galgamuwa, Galge, Galgediyawa, Galgewela, Galgoda, Galgoda-Araluwinna, Galigamuwa, Galkotuwa, Galloba, Galmulla, Galoba, Galtumbe, Galula, Galwalalla, Galwangedipola, Galwetiya, Gambedda, Gamekumbura, Gamewela, Gampaha, Gangoda, Gangoda-arawa, Gangodagama, Gangodapanguwa, Gannekkumbura, Gannekumbura, Garandiulla, Gasgolla, Gawalagama, Gawarammana, Gawarawela, Gawela, Gedarakumbura, Gediwila, Gerandibakinna, Gerendiela, Ginigathgala, Gira-andura, Giragammana, Giramba, Giranduwa, Giriwara, Godahena, Godawelipokuna Hela, Godayagama, Godegama, Godigamuwa, Godunna, Gomagoda, Gonabokka, Gonagala, Gonamotawa, Gonatalawa, Gonatibbatugolla, Gonawala, Goniketiya, Gonkatuwa, Gontalawa, Gorandihela, Gotamegama, Gotuwela, Goussa, Goussagama, Gungoda-arawa, Guruhela, Gurukumbura, Gurumada, Gurumada, Gurupanwela, Gurupihilla, Gurutalawa

== H ==
Habessa, Hadiakumbura, Hakgala, Halatutenna, Haldummulla, Haldumulla, Hali Ela, Halpe, Hamagolla, Hamanawa, Hamapola, Hambegamuwa, Handiyakumbura, Hangilie-ella, Hangiliella, Hangunnawa, Hanthiyawa, Hanukatapitiya, Hanwella, Hapatgamuwa, Happoruwa, Hapugolla, Haputale, Haputalegama, Harakgamakanda, Harankahawa, Hathkinda, Havanawela, Heenapahuwa, Heewelkandura, Hegoda, Hela Tuntala, Hela-alagolla, Heladangamuwa, Helauda, Helaula, Hemagolla, Hemakandapitiya, Henditiyawa, Henebadda, Hepola, Hetekma, Hevelwela, Hewanwatta, Hewelkandura, Hidagama, Hidagamawatta, Hidikiula, Hinapanuwa, Hindagoda, Hingurugamuwa, Hingurukaduwa, Hinnarangahakumbura, Hinnarangolla, Hinnariyamala, Hirimole, Hiripitiya, Horabokka, Horabora, Horadaruwa, Horadoruwa, Horagune, Horambuwa, Horatota, Horoumbawa, Hulandawa, Humbahemada, Hunuketapitiya, Huratgamuwa

== I ==
Ibbanella, Idalgashinna, Idambowa, Idamegama, Ihala Pewuwewa, Ihala Pewwewa, Ihawa, Ikiriyanpola, Ilakkepudena and Dumbadawellawa, Illuka, Illukpelessa, Illuktenna, Ilukarawa, Ilukketiya, Ilukkumbura, Ilukpelessa, Iluktenna, Ilukwelagama, Imbulgoda, Inawella, Indigasella, Indigaswala, Inginiyagala, Inginiyalgala, Inipanduregoda, Iriwendumpola, Iruwendumpola, Issanne-Ara, Itanawatte Megodagama, Itanawatte Thanayamgama, Ititembalagama, Ititempola, Ititumbala

== J ==
Jangula, Jangulle, Jasingama

== K ==
Kabilidowa, Kabilladowa, Kabillewela, Kabillidowa, Kadapalla, Kadarawa, Kaddearawa, Kadegangoda, Kadigangoda, Kadupara, Kadurugahapelessa, Kadurugamuwa, Kahagolla, Kahambana, Kahatagahamaditta, Kahatamaditta, Kahatamba, Kahatapitiya, Kahatarupe, Kahataruppa, Kahattamba, Kahattewela, Kairatnagama, Kalabore, Kalabullanda, Kalagahakivula, Kalagahaulla, Kalagahawaka, Kalawelara, Kalawelgala, Kalawelpotha, Kaleela, Kaletibbawelagama, Kalkanna, Kalubullanda, Kalugahakandura, Kalugahatenna, Kalugahawadiya, Kalugala, Kaluobbe, Kalupahana, Kanahela, Kanahititenna, Kanalkumbura, Kanawarella, Kanawegalla, Kanda, Kandakapuulpota, Kandakepu-ulpota, Kandane Ihala, Kandane Pahala, Kandanketiya, Kandauda Panguwa, Kandegama, Kandegedara, Kandekumbura, Kandetta, Kandinwatta, Kandubedda, Kankanangoda, Kanugolla, Kanulwela, Kanulwela Vidiya, Kanupalaella, Kanuwela Widiya, Kapallewela, Kapuyaya, Karadegangoda, Karagahawela, Karagahawela, Karagaskandura, Karagastenna, Karametiya, Karametiya, Karana, Karandagahamada, Karandagolla, Karande, Karandegama, Karandegangoda, Karandugala, Karanemma, Katabowe, Kataragama, Katugaha, Katugahagalge, Katugallegama, Katuwawala, Kavudawa, Kavudella, Kebellewela, Kebilidowa, Keenahela, Keeriyagolla, Kehelagala, Kehelattawela, Kehelkumbura, Kehellanda, Kehelpota, Kehelwatta, Kelinhitiyawa, Kelipanawela, Keliwessa, Kendagolla, Kendaketiya, Kendalagama, Kendawinna, Keriyagolla, Ketagodagama, Ketakele, Ketakelegama, Ketawatta, Ketawela, Kethdambuwawa, Kethdaubuwawa, Kimbulawela, Kimbullawa, Kinagoda, Kinahela, Kindagalla, Kindigoda, Kinigama, Kinnarabowa, Kinvelgoda, Kiramanagoda, Kiranaulpota, Kirawanagama, Kirawanagoda, Kirawanella, Kirenagoda, Kirimetiya, Kirindegama, Kirioruwa, Kiriwala, Kiriwanagama, Kiriyagolla, Kitalella, Kithulkote, Kitulawela, Kitulkote, Kitulwatta, Kiuleyaya, Kivula, Kivulegama, Kivulegedaragama, Kivuleyaya, Kiwuleyaya, Kodayanna, Kohana, Kohile, Kohombe, Kohonawala, Kohowila, Kohowila-Kitulwatta, Kohukumbura, Kokatiyamaluwa, Kokunawa, Kolabore, Kolalawatta, Kolamana, Kolayaye, Kolgoda, Kolladeniya, Kolongasyaya, Kolongolla, Kolonwinna, Komaligama, Komarikagama, Kongahakumbura, Kongahalinda, Kongolla, Konketiya, Kontahela, Koruppugama, Kosgama Medawela, Kosgama Pallewela, Kosgama Udawela, Kosgolla, Koskanuwa, Koslanda, Kossalpola, Kotabakme, Kotabowa, Kotabowe Vidiya, Kotagama, Kotaganwella, Kotagoda, Kotakitulegama, Kotamuduna, Kotaneluwa, Kotawera Pallegama, Kotawera Udagama, Kotaweramankada, Kotiagoda, Kotigalhela, Kotigoda, Kotika-arawa, Kotikanbokka, Kotiyagala, Kotmallanda, Kottagala, Kottagoda Pallegama, Kottagoda Udagama, Kottalbedda Medagangoda

== L ==
Labugastalawa, Landegama, Landewela, Landewela Bibiligamuwa, Leangawella, Lemastota, Lindamulla, Liyadipitiya North, Liyadipitiya South, Liyangolla, Lolle, Lollegama, Lukasgoda, Lunugala, Lunupottawela

== M ==
Madam, Madawalanda, Madowita Landewela, Madugahapattiya, Madugama, Madugasmulla, Madugastalawa, Madulsima, Madura Oya, Magandanamulla, Magandena, Maha-arawa, Mahabadullagammana, Mahagama, Mahagangoda, Mahagoda, Mahakalugolla, Mahakandura, Mahalunuke, Mahapitiya, Maharawa, Mahaulpota, Mahawela, Mahawelagama, Mahawelatota, Mailagamuwa, Mailagastenna, Makulgolla, Makulgolla, Makulla, Makullewatta, Makulugolla, Malaboda, Malabodagolla, Maladanambe, Malagastalawe Vidiya, Malangama, Malangamuwa, Malattewela, Malgastalawe Vidiya, Malgoda, Maligahena, Maligatenna, Malitenna, Malitta, Malittenna, Maliyadda, Malwattegama, Manaulpotta, Manawela, Mapa-Ella, Marakkanawa, Marawa, Mariarawa, Maspanna, Matikumbura, Mausagolla, Mayilagastenna, Mayilahinna, Medabedda, Medagama, Medagedara, Medagedaragama, Medagodagama, Medaoya, Medaoyegama, Medapatana, Medaperuwa, Medawela, Medayaya, Medebedda, Medipitagama, Medipitiya, Medipokuna, Meditale, Medyaye, Meegahawela, Mellagama, Menadena, Mendalapitiya, Metigahatenna, Metipimbiya, Metiwalalanda, Mideniya, Migahakiula, Migahawela, Migaswewa, Migollegama, Millabedda, Mipanawa, Mirahana, Mirahawatta, Mirisalgangoda, Miriswatta, Miriyabedda, Miyalgala, Miyanakandura, Miyangoda, Molandeniya, Monaragala, Monarawana, Monaragala, Moragahamada, Moragahapitiya, Moragahaulpota, Moragolla, Morahela, Moramalpokuna, Morana, Morattamulla, Moratuwegama, Moretota, Motamale, Mudagamuwa, Mudawa, Mudiyala, Mudumpitagama, Mugunumata, Mullegama, Munhena, Muppane, Muthugalawela, Muttettuwegama, Muttukalewela, Mutuketiyawa

== N ==
Nagahadoruwa, Nagolla, Nahangoda, Nakiyawela, Nakkala, Nambana, Namunukula, Nannapurawa, Nape, Napepanguwa, Naranmankada, Naranwana, Naththaranwalatenna, Naththaranweltenna, Naulla, Nawala, Nawalagama, Nawaneliya, Nawela, Nawelagama, Nayinnewela, Neboda, Neboda South, Neluw, Nemiella, Nevugala, Newgala, Nik-aar, Nik-ara, Nika-ara, Nikapitiya, Nikapota, Nikapotha, Nikawewa, Nilawabedda, Nilgala, Niyadagala, Niyandagala, Nugadandawela, Nugamure, Nugatalawa

== O ==
Obbekota, Ohiya, Okkampitiya, Okkampitiya Ihalagama, Okurawa, Okuruwawa

== P ==
Padukumbura, Pahala Dangamuwa, Pahala Pewwewa, Pahala Pussellawa, Pahala Tuntala, Pahala-Pewuwewa, Pahalagalbokka, Pahalakumbura, Pahalaoya, Pahalayalkumbura, Pahamburutota, Paile, Palagolla, Palawatta, Pallabahirawa, Pallapanguwa, Pallatalawa, Palle Ranugalla, Palle Tambana, Palle Waradola, Palle-ella, Pallebahirawa, Pallebedda, Pallegama, Pallekanda, Pallekiruwa, Pallemallehewa, Pallepanguwa, Pallepattiyakumbura, Palleperuwa, Palletalawa, Pallewela, Pallewelipitiya, Palugama, Palugama-ella, Paluwatta, Panagoda, Panagodagama, Panakanniya, Panamapanguwa, Panditagama, Pangaragammana, Pangura, Panguwa, Panmedilla, Pannakanniya, Pannalagama, Pansalwatta, Papale, Paragaha-Ulpota, Paragahaella, Paragolla, Paranagama, Parapawa, Paretota, Paspewela, Passara, Pataha, Patahagala, Patanagedara, Pathagala, Pattaganwela, Pattipola, Pattipolagama, Pattiyagedaragama, Pattiyagoda, Pattiyakumbura, Pattiyawatta, Peelipotagama, Pelliwinna, Pelwatta, Pelwatta Pahalawela, Pelwatta Udawela, Perahettiya, Perawella, Petiyagoda, Pettaganwela, Pewuwewa, Pidakumbura, Pidakumburagama, Pilipotagama, Pillekumbura, Pillewela, Pimburaulpota, Pinnagolla, Pissegama, Pitadeniya, Pitahagedaragama, Pitakola Pallegama, Pitakola Udagama, Pitakumbura, Pitamaruwa, Pitatalawa, Pitawela, Pitawelagama, Pitiyekumbura, Piyarapana, Polgahaarawa, Polgahagama, Polgahakumbura, Polgahatenna, Polkotan-arawa, Polwatta, Poodulla, Pottaganwela, Potubandana, Potuliyadda, Pubbara, Puhulpola, Punawinna, Puralewela, Puranwela, Puselketiya, Pussalgolla, Pussallakanda, Pusselketiya, Pussellawa, Puwakgahawatta, Puwakgoda

== R ==
Radakandurewela, Radaliyadda, Rahupola, Rambukpota, Ranasinghagama, Randeniya, Rannanguhawa, Ranugalla, Ratambe, Ratana, Ratkarauwa, Rathkarawwa, Ratkitakanda, Ratkittakanda, Ratmalewehera, Ratmalgahaella, Ratmalwehera, Rattanadeniya, Rawanaella, Rerawa, Rerupitiya, Reulvala, Revulvala, Rideepana, Ridimaliyadda, Ridimalliadde, Ridipana, Ritigaha-arawa, Ritigahadowa, Ritigahawatta, Ritikumbura, Rittawela, Rukkattana, Ruppebedda

== S ==
Seeniagaslanda, Seenigaslanda, Senapathiya, Senapatiya, Seranegama, Sinuggala, Sittarama, Siyambala-anduwa, Siyambalagune, Siyambalanduwa, Siyambalawinna, Soranatota, Stripuregama, Sudupanawela, Sudupanawelagama, Suriya-aar, Suriya-ara

== T ==
Talabowatta, Talagahagedara, Talagangoda, Talakolawewa, Talakumbura, Talangamuwa, Talapuranwela, Talawa, Talawatta, Talawegama, Taldena, Talgahadigane, Talgahakumbura, Talkota, Tallanda, Tampalawela, Tanamalwila, Telhawadigama, Tellulla, Tembakumbura, Tembakumburegama, Tennakonwela, Tennuge, Terappahuwa, Terela, Tetille, Thampalawela, Thelhawadigama, Thenkeliya, Thimbirigaspitiya, Timbirigahamankada, Timbiriya, Tithawelkandura, Tiththawelkeula, Tittawelgolla, Tittawelkandura, Tolabowatta, Tolabowatta Pallegama, Tolabowatta Udagama, Tundawela, Tunnawa

== U ==
Uda Oyegama, Uda Waradola, Uda-Dompe, Uda-arawa, Uda-oyagama, Udabahirawa, Udabokka, Udadambiya, Udagama, Udagangoda, Uda Oyegama, Uda Waradola, Uda-Dompe, Uda-arawa, Uda-oyagama, Udabahirawa, Udabokka, Udadambiya, Udagama, Udagangoda, Udakanda, Udakendagolla, Udakohowila, Udakumbalwela, Udakumbura, Udalakumbura, Udamallehewa, Udamulla, Udapanguwa, Udapattiyagama, Udapattiyakumbura, Udaperuwa, Udatambana, Udaturegama, Udawadiya, Udawalawe, Udawela, Udayaya, Udubadana, Uduhawara, Udukumbalwela, Udukumbura, Udumulla, Udunuwatta, Udupillegama, Ukdunuwatta, Ulpenarawa, Ulpota, Ulugala, Ululla, Ulvita, Uma Ela, Unagolla, Unagollegama, Unampitiya, Unapana, Unapotuwela, Uraniya, Uraula, Urumetenna, Urupitiya, Ussagala, Uyanabedda

== V ==
Veheragala, Velagangoda, Viharamulla, Viragaha-elle, Viragahaella, Vykumbra

== W ==
Wadawala, Wadiyegama, Wagurewela, Wahugalla, Wakarawa, Wakkumbura, Walakumbura, Walasbedda, Walasella, Walhaputenna, Walikemulla, Wangiyakumbura, Waradeniyawa, Waragama, Waralanda, Warralande, Watagodagama, Watawana, Watawanagama, Watta, Wattakele, Wattegama, Wattegedara, Wattegepelessa, Wattekele, Wattekele, Wattepanguwa, Wattewela, Waywatta, We-eliya, Wedigune, Wedikumbura, Wediwelagama, Weerapokuna, Weerasekeragama, Wegama, Weheragala, Wekada, Wekumbura, Welanhinna, Welanpela, Welanwita, Welegama, Welegangoda, Welgolla, Welhaputenna, Weli-aar, Weliara, Weliarawa, Welikadagama, Welikemulla, Welimada, Weliulla, Weliwatta, Welkele, Wellabokka, Wellawaya, Wellawela, Wellebokka, Wellewatta, Wellewela, Welpita, Weragama, Weragoda, Werapokuna, Weregoda, Werellapatana, Wessigewela, Wetalawa, Wevelhinna, Wewagederagama, Wewatenna, Wewatta, Wewebedde, Wewegama, Wewegedaragama, Wewelhinna, Widurepola, Wila Oya, Wilaatigoda, Wilegama, Wiletigoda, Willa, Wilsons Bungalow, Wiragahaella, Wiranegama, Wirasekeragama

== See also ==
- List of cities in Sri Lanka
- List of towns in Sri Lanka
