= List of settlements in Sabaragamuwa Province =

Sabaragamuwa Province is a province of Sri Lanka, containing the Kegalle District and Ratnapura District. The following is a list of settlements in the province.

== A ==
Abuwangala, Adavikanda, Adawikanda, Adikariya, Agalagama, Agalagamuwa, Agalawatta, Agalekumbura, Agaregama, Ahaspokuna, Ahuliyadda, Akarella, Akurana, Akurugegangoda, Akwatta, Alagalkanda, Alagalla, Alakolaella, Alankarapanguwa, Alapaladeniya, Alapalawala, Alawala, Alawatura, Alawwa, Aldora, Algama, Algama Egodagama, Algama Ihalagama, Algama Medagama, Algoda, Alkegama, Allagalla, Alpitiya, Aludeniya, Aluketiya, Alupatgala, Alupola, Alupota, Alutnuwara, Amanawala, Amarakonmulla, Amarakoonmulla, Ambagahakanda, Ambagala, Ambakumbura, Ambalakanda, Ambalanpitiya, Ambalanyaya, Ambamalla, Ambanpitiya, Ambatenna, Ambawala, Ambepussa, Ambulugala, Ambuwakka, Ambuwangala, Amitirigala, Ammuduwa, Ampagala, Ampana, Ampe, Amuhenkanda, Amunumulla, Amunutenna, Amupitiya, Amutagoda, Amuwatta, Amuwatugoda, Andadola, Andanawa, Andaoluwa, Andiramada, Andiyamalatenna, Andoluwa, Anduwawala, Angammana, Anghandiya, Angoda, Angodakanda, Anguruwawala, Anguruwella, Anhandiya, Anhettigama, Anwarama, Arabboda, Arachchikumbura, Arama, Arambegama, Aranayaka, Arandara, Arawegoda, Aruggammana, Aruggoda, Arukgammana, Arukmulla, Aruppala, Asamanakanda, Asgangula, Asideniya, Asmadala, Assedduma, Asseddungoda, Asseddunwela, Atakalanpanne, Atalawa, Atale, Atallawela, Ataudakanda, Athalawa, Attanagoda, Attapitiya, Atugoda, Atulugama, Aturaliya, Aturupana, Ayagama

== B ==
Badahela, Badahelagoda, Badahelgoda, Badanamure, Badullawala, Badullegama, Badulupitiya, Baduwalakanda, Bagature, Bakmideniya, Bakulwala, Balagangoda, Balaharuwa, Balakottunna, Balakotuwa, Balangoda, Balatgomuwa, Balavinna, Balawane, Balawatgama, Balawathgama, Balawinna, Balibatgoda, Balibathgoda, Balinduwawa, Ballahela, Ballapana, Ballapanatenna, Bambarabotuwa, Bambarabotuwegkanda, Bambaragala, Bambaragama, Bambaragastenna, Bampane, Bamunagammana, Bamunaulla, Banagoda, Basnagala, Basnagoda, Batadure, Bataendiriya, Batakada, Batambure, Batangala, Batatota, Batawala, Batayaya, Batepola, Batewela, Batgangoda, Batugedara, Batugedera, Batupitiya, Batuwana, Batuwatta, Batuwita, Beddawala, Belgoda, Beligala, Beligammana, Beligoda, Beligodapitiya, Belihul Oya, Belihulwana, Beliketiya, Belimaliyadda, Bellangama, Bellankanda, Beminiwatta, Bendaluwa, Beragala, Berannawa, Berendeniya, Berenduwa, Berranawa, Beruwala, Betmegedara, Bewila, Bewilehena, Bibila, Bibilegama, Binnegama, Bintenigolla, Bisowela, Bodawala, Bodimalgoda, Bodimaluwa, Bogahakumbura, Bogahakumburuwela, Bogala, Bogamuwa, Bogoda-aramba, Bohara, Bohettiya, Bohora, Bokolamulla, Bolagama, Boltumbe, Bopetta, Bopitigoda, Bopitiya, Boralankanda, Boranjamuwa, Boruggamuwa, Bossella, Botiyatenna, Bowalgaha, Bowatta, Boyagama, Boyagoda, Budawatta, Budunwela, Bulatgama, Bulathkohupitiya, Bulatkohupitiya, Bulatwatta, Bulatwelgoda, Bulatwelkanda, Bulugahapitiya, Bulugammana, Buluruppa, Bulutota, Buluwana, Bungeriya, Bungiriya, Burunnawa, Buthkanda, Butkanda

== C ==
Colombage-ara

== D ==
Dadayankanda, Dahenpahuwa, Dalumurawatta, Damahana, Dambawinna, Dambemada, Dambulla, Dambuluwana, Damme, Dampelgoda, Damunupola, Danagama, Dandawa, Dandeniya Pahala, Dangampala, Dankolagune, Dankumbura, Dannoruwa, Daswatta, Davulkaragoda, Dayigala Ihala, Dayigala Pahala, Debagama, Debathgama, Dedigama, Dedugala, Degalaeriya, Deharagoda, Dehenakanda, Deheragoda, Dehigahapitiya, Dehigampala, Dehigastalawa, Dehimaduwa, Dehiowita, Dehipahala, Dehipitiya, Deiyagala, Dela, Delarawa, Deldeniya, Delgahagoda, Delgahatenna, Delgamuwa, Delgoda, Delgomuwa, Deliwala, Dellaboda, Deloluwa, Delpatdeniya, Delpothdeniya, Delwala, Demada, Demalahiriya, Demanagammana, Dembatanpitiya, Demodara, Denagama, Denawaka Patakada, Denawaka Udakada, Denawakawatta, Denihena, Denuwakanda, Depedene, Deraniyagala, Dessepota, Detabodakanda, Detawala, Devanagala, Dewalagama, Dewanagala, Dewaragampola, Digadure, Digalla, Diganakanda, Digogedara, Digowa, Dikelikanda, Dikella, Dikellekanda, Dimbulgamuwa, Dimbulwala, Dimiyawa, Dimiyawegodella, Dippitigala, Dippitiya, Divurumpitiya, Diwala Pallegama, Diwala Udagama, Diwelgama, Diyabibile, Diyagala, Diyagama, Diyahitiyawala, Diyainna, Diyapota, Diyasunnata, Diyawinna, Dodammuluwa, Dodampe, Dodampegoda, Dodampitiya, Dodantale, Dodawatta, Dolekanda, Doloswala, Doloswalkanda, Dombagammana, Dombagaswinna, Dombemada, Dombepola, Dompemulla, Dompitiya, Dooldeniya, Doolgala, Doranuwa, Dorapane, Dorawaka, Dorawela, Duldeniya, Dumbara, Dumbuluwa, Dumbuluwawa, Dumbuluwawaka, Dumbuluwewa, Dummaladeniya, Dunugama, Dunukewala, Dunumale, Dunumandalawa, Duragekanda, Durakanda

== E ==
Ebetota, Ebidigala, Edanduwawa, Edurapola, Edurapota, Egalla, Egallekanda, Eggodakanda, Egodagoda, Egodakanda, Egodawatugoda, Egolla, Ehalagaha-arawa, Ehelekumbura, Eheliyagoda, Ekiriyagala, Ekneligoda, Ela-Ihala, Elagalla, Elamaideniya, Elamalpe, Elangipitiya, Elapata, Elibodakanda, Ella, Ellawala, Ellawala Ihalagama, Ellawala Pahalagama, Ellearawa, Ellegedara, Ellehena, Ellekanda, Ellepola, Ellewatta, Elugala, Elugalla, Eluwana, Eluwana, Embilipitiya, Embilipitiya Pallegama, Embilmiwala, Embuldeniya, Embulmiwala, Emitiyagoda, Endana, Endirikele, Endiriyanwala, Epalapitiya, Epalatotuwa, Epalawa, Epitawala, Eppelapitiya, Erabadda, Erabadupela, Erabedda, Erabudupitiya, Erabuduwala, Eraminigammana, Eratnagoda, Eregama, Erepola, Ereporuwa, Ereporuwa, Erevupola, Eriyawa, Etaheraliyagoda, Etawakwala, Etnawala, Etoya, Evunugalla

== G ==
Gabbala, Gabbela, Gabbelawatta, Gadapola, Galadeniya, Galahitigama, Galahitiya, Galamella, Galapahalagama, Galapaya, Galapitamada, Galapitimada, Galatara, Galaudakanda, Galayatakanatta, Galboda, Galbokaya, Galenda, Galgomuwa, Galkaduwa, Galkanda, Galkandagoda, Galkerekanda, Galketiya, Gallassapola, Gallela, Gallelletota, Gallenakanda, Gallinna, Galpallelanda, Galpata, Galpaya, Galpola, Galukagama, Galwalagoda, Gamagepetta, Gamekkanda, Gamikkanda, Gammanagoda, Gammannagoda, Gammedda, Gampalawalakada, Ganegama, Ganegangoda, Ganegoda, Gangalagomuwa, Gangekumbura, Gangoda, Gangodagama, Gangodakanda, Gangodakumbura, Gangulwitiya, Ganitapura, Ganithapura, Gansabhawa, Gantuna Pallegama, Gantuna Udagama, Gantune-Pallegama, Gantune-Udagama, Garagoda, Gasnawa, Gawaragiriya, Gayirenagama, Gerandiella, Gerapatgama, Getaberikanda, Getahetta, Getamuruta, Getangama, Getiyamulla, Gevilipitiya, Gilimale, Ginihappitiya, Ginitillawala, Giramadola, Glenella, Godagama, Godagampola, Godagandeniya, Godagedara, Godakawela, Godakumbura, Godapola, Godawela, Godayakanda, Godella, Godigamuwa, Golahela, Gomaduwa, Gomiarawa, Gonagala, Gonagaldeniya, Gonagomuwa, Gonakumbura, Gonapitiya, Gonaramba, Gonawala, Gondiwala, Gorokgahamada, Gulanekanda, Guriyamba, Gurubewila, Gurubewilagama, Gurugalla, Gurulawella, Guruluwana

== H ==
Haalmessa, Habalakkawa, Habbeliara, Habbunkaduwa, Hakahinna, Hakamuwa, Hakurugammana, Hakuruliyadda, Halagiriya, Halaturakele

== I ==
Idampitiya, Idangoda, Iddamalgoda, Iddawala, Iduranpitiya, Ihala Dayigala, Ihala Kalugala, Ihala Pohorabawa, Ihalagalagama, Ihalagama, Ihalakanda, Ihalakotte, Ilipangamuwa, Illukpitiya, Illuktenna, Ilubbuluwa, Ilukgoda, Ilukkumbura, Ilukkumburagoda, Ilukkumburugoda, Ilukpitiya, Iluktenna, Ilwana, Imbulamura, Imbulana, Imbulgala, Imbulgoda, Imbulhititenna, Imbulpe, Imbulpitiya, Imekanda, Imewatta, Indikatupana, Indolewatta, Indurana, Induranpitiya, Induruwa, Ingiriyawatta, Iriyamaditta, Iriyaulla, Ittekanda

== J ==
Jatunkanda, Jeewana, Jeewandeniya, Jiwana, Jiwanadeniya

== K ==
Kabagamuwa, Kabulumulla, Kachchigala, Kadadora, Kadadorakanda, Kadawatakanda, Kadawattiya, Kadigamuwa, Kadigomuwa, Kadigomuwa

== L ==
Labugama, Lahupane, Lakmana, Lambutuwa, Landuyaya, Lassegama, Lassekanda, Leeniyagala, Lekamagoda, Lekamgoda, Lekangoda, Lellagoda, Lellopitiya, Lenagala, Lenagala Ihala, Lenagala Pahala, Lendaramulla, Lessagama, Leuke, Lewala, Lewangama Dumbuluwa, Lewangama Pahalagama, Lewangama Talawatta, Lewangama Udagammedda, Liniyagala, Liniyakaduwa, Liyana-arachchigama, Liyanagegama, Liyandawela, Liyangahatota, Liyangastota, Lolgoda

== M ==
Maboda, Mabopitiya, Madagammana, Madakandura, Madalagama, Madalagama, Madampe, Madana, Madare

== N ==
Naberiyawa, Nabuluwa, Nabuluwa, Nadeniya, Nagoda, Nagomuwa, Nahalwatura, Nahitiya, Nakandala, Nakkawita

== O ==
Obokka, Oddape, Oddare, Okanmulla, Olagama, Olitenna, Olugala, Olugantota, Omalpe, Opanake, Opata, Opata, Opata, Opatha, Otnapitiya, Owala, Owala Kudabage, Owala Mahabage, Owatta, Owatta, Owatura, Owitigamuwa, Owitiwara

== P ==
Padalangala, Padawigampola, Padidora, Padugama, Pagalowita, Pagoda, Pahala Dayigala, Pahala Hinguruwaka, Pahala Kalugala, Pahala Pohorabawa

== R ==
Rabbidigala, Radagoda, Raddella, Ragala, Ragalkanda, Rahala, Rajawaka, Rakwana, Rambuka, Rambukanagama

== S ==
Sannasgama, Selawa, Silanarawa, Silogama, Singagoda, Singahagoda, Singappulikanda, Sinhalagoda, Sitagalapanguwa, Sitagangula, Siyambalangamuwa, Siyambalapitiya, Siyambalapitiya, Siyambalapitiya, Siyambalawa, Siyambalawala, Siyambalawala, Sudagala, Suduhakurukanda, Suriyakanda, Rassagala

== T ==
Talagahawatta, Talagahayaya, Talagaskanda, Talangama, Talangama, Talapitiya, Talapitiya, Talawatta, Taldewa, Talduwa

== U ==
Uda Beddewala, Uda Beddewela, Uda Dadayankanda, Uda Galadeniya, Uda Hinguruwaka, Uda Karandupone, Uda Pamunuwa, Uda Yogama, Udabage, Udagama

== V ==
Veddagala

== W ==
Wadakahadeniya, Wadamaldeniya, Waddeniya, Wadiyatenna, Wadukanda, Wadumulla, Wadupola, Waduwadeniya, Waduwawela, Waguregama

== See also ==
- List of cities in Sri Lanka
- List of towns in Sri Lanka
