= List of hospitals in Sri Lanka =

The following is a list of mainstream hospitals in Sri Lanka.

== Central Province ==
=== Kandy District ===
==== Government Hospitals ====
Line Ministry Hospitals

- National Hospital (Teaching), Kandy
- Sirimavo Bandaranayake Specialized Children Hospital (Teaching), Peradeniya
- General Hospital (Teaching), Peradeniya
- District General Hospital Nawalapitiya - Nawalapitiya

Hospitals of The Provincial Department of Health Services

- Base Hospital (Teaching) Gampola
- District General Theldeniya
- DH Akurana
- DH Ankumbura
- PMCU Abagahapelessa
- PMCU Atabage
- DH Babaradeniya
- DH Batumulla
- DH Bokkawala
- PMCU Deltota
- DH Dolosbage
- DH Dunhinna
- DH Galagedara
- DH Galaha
- PMCU Galhinna
- PMCU Gelioya
- DH Galapihlla
- DH Kadugannawa
- DH Katugastota
- DH Kahawatta
- PMCU Kolongoda
- PMCU Kotaligoda
- DH Kuruduwatta
- DH Jambuguhapitiya
- DH Madolkale
- DH Mampitiya
- DH Marassana
- DH Menikhinna
- DH Medamahanuwara
- DH Medawala
- DH Morayaya
- PMCU Morahena
- DH Muruthalawa
- DH Narampanawa
- DH Hatharaliyadda
- DH Hasalaka
- DH Pussellawa
- PMCU Pamunuwa
- PMCU Pallegama
- PMCU Panwilathanna
- PMCU Sangarajapura
- PMCU Handabowa

==== Private Hospitals ====
- Kandy Nursing Home, Kandy
- Lakeside Adventist Hospital, Kandy
- Suwasewana Hospital, Kandy
- Asiri Hospital, Kandy
- MK Hospital, Gampola
- Kandy Private Hospital, Kandy
- Cayo Dental Hospital, Gelioya, Kandy
- Kandy Central Hospital, Gelioya

=== Matale District ===
==== Government Hospitals ====
===== Line Ministry Hospitals =====
- District General Hospital Matale

===== Hospitals under Matale RDHS =====
Divisional Hospitals

- Aluvihara
- Madipola
- Bandarapolawatta
- Maraka
- Devahuwa
- Matale North Dullawa
- Muwandeniya
- Elkaduwa
- Nalanda
- Galewela
- Opalgala
- Gammaduwa
- Ovilikanda
- Gurubebila
- Paldeniya
- Handungamuwa
- Pallepola
- Hattota Amuna
- Rattota
- Illukkumbura
- Sigiriya
- Kalundawa
- Ukuwela
- Koongahawela
- Wahakotte
- Laggala Pallegama
- Wewalawela
- Leliambe
- Yatawatta
- Lenadora

MOH Offices

- Ambanganga
- Pallepola
- Dambulla
- Rattota
- Galewela
- Ukuwela
- Laggala Pallegama
- Wilgamuwa
- Matale
- Yatawatta
- Naula
- Pallepola

Other Health Institutions

- Anti Malaria Campaign
- Regional MSD
- Chest Clinic
- STD Clinic

Private Hospitals

- Kumudu Hospital
- Co-operative Hospital - Matale
- Matale Nursing Home
- Matale Medical Center

== North Central Province ==
=== Anuradhapura District ===
==== Government Hospitals ====
Line Ministry Hospitals

- DGH Anuradhapura(Teaching), මහ රොහල ශික්ෂන

Hospitals of The Provincial Department of Health Services

- BH Kahatagasdigiliya
- BH Padaviya
- BH Kebethigollewa
- DH Thalawa
- BH Thamnutthegama
- DH Kekirawa
- DH Eppawala
- DH Katiyawa
- DH Mihinthale
- DH Horowpothana
- DH Madawachchiya
- DH Thanthirimale
- DH Galenbindunuwewa
- DH Rajanganaya

==== Private hospitals ====
- Royal Hospital, Anuradhapura
- Suwa Shanthi Private Hospital, Anuradhapura
- Walisundara Hospital, Anuradhapura
- Co-Operative Hospital, Anuradhapura
- Suwasewana Hospital, Anuradhapura

Military Hospitals

- Victory Military Hospital, Anuradhapura

=== Polonnaruwa District ===
==== Government Hospitals ====
Line Ministry Hospitals

- DGH Polonnaruwa (General)

Hospitals of The Provincial Department of Health Services

- BH Medirigiriya
- BH Welikanda
- DH Hingurakgoda
- DH Bakamoona
- DH Manampitiya
- DH Aralaganwia
- RH Jayanthipura
- RH Aththanakadawala

Specialized Hospitals

- Sri Lanka-China friendship National Nephrology Hospital

Private Hospitals

- Venus Lanka Hospital & Laboratory Services

== North Western Province ==
=== Kurunegala District ===
==== Government Hospitals ====
Line Ministry Hospitals

- Teaching Hospital Kurunegala
- Kuliyapitiya Hospital (Teaching)

Hospitals of The Provincial Department of Health Services

- Alawwa Hospital, Alawwa (District Hospital)
- Galgamuwa Hospital (District Base Hospital)
- Kuliyapitiya Hospital, Kuliyapitiya (District Base)
- Maho Hospital, Maho (Divisional)
- Narammala Hospital, Narammala (Divisional)
- Nikaweratiya Hospital, Nikaweratiya (District Base)
- Polgahawela Hospital, Polgahawela (Divisional)
- Warialpola Hospital, Wariyapola (Divisional)
- Dambadenniya Hospital,(Giriulla)(base Hospital)

==== Private Hospitals ====
- Central Hospital (Nawinne), Kurnuegala
- Cooperative Hospital, Kurunegala
- Seth Sevana Hospital, Kurunegala
- Miracle Health hospital, Kurunegala
- sakukidentalhospital, Kurunegala
- Nawinna Hospital, Kurunegala

=== Puttalam District ===
==== Government Hospitals ====
Line Ministry Hospitals

- Chilaw general hospital

Provincial council hospitals

- Base Hospital(A), Puttalam
- Base hospital(B), Marawila
- Base Hospital(B), Kalpitiya
- Base Hospital (B), Anamaduwa
- Divisional Hospital(A), Dankotuwa
- Divisional Hospital (B) Mundel
- Divisional Hospital (B) Lunuwila
- Divisional Hospital (B) Udappuwa
- Divisional Hospital (C) Madampe
- Divisional Hospital (C) Galmuruwa
- Divisional Hospital (C) Anawilundawa
- Dvisional Hospital (C) Mahakumbukkadawala
- Divisional Hospital (C) Kottanthivu
- Divisional Hospital (C) Mampuri
- Divisional Hospital (C) Wanathawilluwa
- Dvisional Hospital (C) Thabbowa
- Divisional Hospital (C) Aluthgama
- Divisional Hospital (C) Kottukachchiya
- Divisional Hospital(C) Nawagaththegama

Primary Medical Care Units

- PMCU Karathivu
- PMCU Weppamadu
- PMCU Al Quassimmi
- PMCU Karamba
- PMCU Puludivayal
- PMCU Alankuda
- PMCU Thalawila
- PMCU kandakuda
- PMCU Nagavillu
- PMCU Hidayathnagar
- PMCU Mudalakkuliya
- PMCU Pallama
- PMCU Madawakkulama
- PMCU Wijayakatupotha
- PMCU Wilpotha
- PMCU Kokkawila
- PMCU Thambagalla
- PMCU Maningala
- PMCU Naththandiya
- PMCU Walahapitiya
- PMCU Yatakalana
- PMCU Kirimetiyana
- PMCU Pothuwatawana
- PMCU Koswatta
- PMCU Thoduwawa
- PMCU Wennappuwa
- PMCU Nainamadama
- PMCU Madurankuliya
- PMCU Mellawa

==== Private Hospitals ====
- St. Anne's Nursing Home, Marawila
- Balasooriya Hospital, Puttalam
- Suwana Private Hospital, Chilaw
- Life Care Hospital, Wennappuwa
- Kuwait Hospital, Nedunkulama
- Digasiri Hospital, Puttalam

== Sabaragamuwa Province ==
=== Ratnapura District ===
==== Government Hospitals ====
- Rathnapura Teaching Hospital, Rathnapura (Teaching)
- Base Hospital, Embilipitiya
- Base Hospital, Balangoda (District Base)
- Rambukkana District Hospital

==== Private Hospitals ====
- Singhe Hospitals PLC (Ratnapura)
- Cooperative Hospital, Ratnapura
- Green Medicare Hospital, Embilipitiya
- Navodya Private Hospital, Embilipitiya

=== Government hospitals ===
- Teaching hospital Kegalle Kegalle
- base hospital, mawanella
- base hospital, warakapola
- base hospital, karawanella

==== private Hospitals ====
- Medisevana Hospitals (Pvt) Limited Mawanella
- osro hospital kegalle
- dimantha hospital kegalle
- candella hospital kegalle
- osro hospital mawanella

== Southern Province ==
=== Galle District ===
==== Government Hospitals ====
Line Ministry Hospitals

- Galle National Hospital (Teaching), Karapitiya, Galle
- German-Sri Lanka Friendship New Women’s & Maternity Hospital(UnderNational Hospital of Galle),Karapitiya, Galle
- Mahamodera Maternity Hospital, Galle (Special, Teaching)

Hospitals of The Provincial Department of Health Services

- District Hospital, Baddegama (Grade A)
- District Hospital, Ambalangoda
- District Hospital, Elpitiya
- District Hospital, Udugama
- District Hospital, Unawatuna
- District Hospital, Karandeniya
- Base Hospital, Balapitiya (Grade A)

==== Private Hospitals ====
- Co-operative Hospital, Galle
- Asiri Hospital Galle (Previously named as Hemas Southern Hospital), Galle
- Roseth Hospital, Ambalangoda
- Ruhunu Hospital, Galle
- Suvana Suva Madiya Hospital, Ambalangoda
- Queensbury Hospitals, Karapitiya, Galle
- Baddegama Medical Center, Baddegama

=== Hambantota District ===
==== Government Hospital ====
- Hambantota District General Hospital, Hambantota
- Tissamaharama Base Hospital, Debarawewa
- Tangalle Base Hospital, Tangalle
- Walasmulla Base Hospital, Walasmulla
- Ambalantota Divisional Hospital, Ambalantota
- Angunukolapelessa Divisional Hospital, Angunukolapelessa
- Beliatta Divisional Hospital, Beliatta
- Sooriyawewa Divisional Hospital, Sooriyawewa

==== Private Hospitals ====
- Holton Hospital, Walasmulla
- Southern Lanka Hospital, Tangalle
- Arogya Hospital, Tangalle

=== Matara District ===
==== Government Hospitals ====
Line Ministry Hospitals

- Kamburupitiya Base Hospital, Kamburupitiya
- District General Hospital, Matara
- Gangodagama Hospital (Hakmana)
- Allewela Hospital (Allewela)

Hospitals of The Provincial Department of health Services

==== Private Hospitals ====
- Asiri Hospital, Matara
- Co-operative Hospital, Matara
- Medicare Hospital, Matara
- Mohotti Private Hospital, Matara
- Matara Nursing Home, Matara

== Uva Province ==
=== Badulla District ===
==== Government Hospitals ====
- Badulla Provincial General Hospital, Badulla
- Diyatalawa Base Hospital, Diyatalawa
- Mahiyanganaya Base Hospital, Mahiyangana
- Welimada Base Hospital, Welimada
- Bandarawela District Hospital, Bandarawela
- Haldummulla District Hospital, Haldummulla
- Haputhale District Hospital, Haputhale
- Kandaketiya District Hospital, Kandaketiya
- Koslanda District Hospital, Koslanda
- Lunugala District Hospital, Lunugala
- Matigahathenna District Hospital, Matigahathenna
- Meegahakiula District Hospital, Meegahakiula
- Passara District Hospital, Passara
- Uva Paranagama District Hospital, Uva Paranagama
- Uraniya District Hospital, Uraniya
- Kahataruppa Divisional Hospital, Kahataruppa
- Mirahawatte Divisional Hospital, Mirahawatte
- Ettampitiya Divisional Hospital, Ettampitiya
- Boralanda Divisional Hospital, Boralanda
- Wewegama Divisional Hospital, Wewegama
- Ekiriyankumbura Divisional Hospital, Ekiriyankumbura
- Nedungamuwa Divisional Hospital, Nedungamuwa
- Bogahakumbura Divisional Hospital, Bogahakumbura
- Kendagolla Divisional Hospital, Kendagolla
- Kandegedara Divisional Hospital, Kandegedara
- Sprinwelly Divisional Hospital, Sprinwelly
- Robery Divisional Hospital, Robery
- Hopton Divisional Hospital, Hopton
- Ury Divisional Hospital, Ury
- Glenor Divisional Hospital, Glenor
- Demodara Divisional Hospital, Demodara
- Dambethenna Divisional Hospital, Dambethenna
- Kanaverella Divisional Hospital, Kanaverella
- Uva Highland Divisional Hospital, Uva Highland
- Downside Divisional Hospital, Downside
- Hakgala Divisional Hospital, Hakgala
- Poonagala Divisional Hospital, Poonagala
- Sarniya Divisional Hospital, Sarniya
- Unagolla Divisional Hospital, Unagolla
- Thelbedda Divisional Hospital, Thelbedda
- Mahadowa Divisional Hospital, Mahadowa
- Kurkeels Divisional Hospital, Kurkeels
- Galauda Peripheral Unit, Galauda
- Meedumpitiya Rehabilitation Centre, Meedumpitiya
- Bibilegama Central Dispensry, Bibilegama
- Ballaketuwa Central Dispensry, Ballaketuwa
- Haliela Central Dispensry, Haliela
- Halpe Central Dispensry, Halpe
- Keppetipola Central Dispensry, Keppetipola
- Liyangahawela Central Dispensry, Liyangahawela
- Namunukula Central Dispensry, Namunukula
- Dambana Central Dispensry, Dambana
- Lunuwaththa Central Dispensry, Lunuwaththa
- Bathalayaya Central Dispensry, Bathalayaya
- Nagadeepa Central Dispensry, Nagadeepa
- Hebarawa Central Dispensry, Hebarawa
- Hewanakumbura Central Dispensry, Hewanakumbura
- Rilpola Central Dispensry, Rilpola
- Ella Central Dispensry, Ella
- Thaldena Central Dispensry, Thaldena

==== Private Hospitals ====
- Central Hospital, Badulla

=== Monaragala District ===
==== Government Hospitals ====
- Monaragala District General Hospital, Monaragala
- Wellawaya Base Hospital, Wellawaya
- Bibila Base Hospital, Bibila
- Siyambalanduwa Base Hospital, Siyambalanduwa
- Badalkumbura District Hospital, Badalkumbura
- Buththala District Hospital, Buththala
- Medagama District Hospital, Medagama
- Inginiyagala District Hospital, Inginiyagala
- Katharagama District Hospital, Katharagama
- Thanamalvila District Hospital, Thanamalvila
- Hambegamuva District Hospital, Hambegamuva
- Handapanagala Rural Hospital, Handapanagala
- Sevanagala Rural Hospital, Sevanagala
- Hingurukaduwa Rural Hospital, Hingurukaduwa
- Ethimale Rural Hospital, Ethimale
- Pitakumbura Rural Hospital, Pitakumbura
- Okkampitiya Rural Hospital, Okkampitiya
- Dambagalla Rural Hospital, Dambagalla

==== Private Hospitals ====
- Monaragala Nursing Home, Monaragala
- Uva Private Hospital, Wellawaya
