= List of settlements in Western Province (Sri Lanka) =

Western Province is a province of Sri Lanka, containing the Colombo District, Gampaha District, and Kalutara District. The following is a list of settlements in the province.

== A ==
Aboyne, Adikarigoda, Adikarimulla, Adikkandiya, Adupe, Agalawatta, Agalegedara, Ahugammana, Akaragama, Akarangaha, Akarawita, Akarawita, Akkaragoda, Akureliya, Akurukalawita, Akurumulla, Alakandupitiya, Alavi, Alawala, Alawatupitiya, Alubomulla, Alubowila, Alugolla, Alutepola, Alutgama Bogamuwa, Alutgama Bogomuwa, Alutgama East, Alutgama West, Alutgamwidiya, Alutgangoda, Aluthgama, Aluthgamwidiya, Aluthkade, Alutkade Tunmanhandiya, Alutkadetenmanhandiya, Alwis Town, Amandoluwa, Ambagahawatta, Ambagaspitiya, Ambalammulla, Ambalanduwa, Ambalangoda, Ambalanmulla, Ambalayaya, Ambana, Ambanwita, Ambatale, Ambegoda, Ambepitiya, Ambepussa, Ambepussa Government Farm, Ambulgama, Ampitigala, Amunugoda, Amunukumbura, Andiambalam Walpola, Andiambalama, Andigoda, Andimalla, Andimulla, Andiya, Andupe, Angampitiya, Angangoda, Anganpitiya, Angoda, Angomuwa, Angulana, Anguruwatota, Anuragoda, Arakagoda, Arakawila, Aramangoda, Arambe, Arambegodella, Aramonagolla, Arangala, Arapangama, Arukgoda, Arukpassa, Arukwatta, Arupassa, Asgeriya, Asgiriwalpola, Asgiriya, Assenawatta, Assennawatta, Atale, Atgalgoda, Athagama, Athgalgoda, Athgangoda, Atigala, Attanagalla, Attidiya, Atulugama, Atupatdeniya, Atupotdeniya, Atupothdeniya, Atura, Ature, Athurugiriya, Atweltota, Avariwatta, Avissawella, Awariwatta

== B ==
Badahalagoda, Badalgama, Badalgoda, Badanagoda, Badugama, Badureliya, Baduwatugoda, Bajjangoda, Balabowa, Balagalla, Battaramulla, Beruwala

== C ==
Catharine's, Cinnamon Gardens, Colombo, Colpetty

== D ==
Dadagamuwa, Dagona, Dahenpahuwa, Dalugama, Dalugangoda, Dalupatgedara, Dalupotha, Daluwekotuwa, Dambadurai, Dambadure, Dharga Town, Dehiwala

== E ==
Egaloya, Egoda Uyana, Egodawatta, Egodawatta, Ekala, Ekalakurunduwatta, Ekela, Eladuva, Eladuwa, Eladuwa, Elamalawala, Elamalewala, Elapiliyawa, Elapitawala, Elapitiwela, Elapitiyala, Eliwila, Ellakkala, Ellalamulla, Ellangala, Elluvapitiya, Elston, Eluwapitiya, Embaraluwa, Enderamulla, Epambula, Epamulla, Erabadda, Erabedda, Erepolagodella, Erewwala, Essella, Eswatta, Etgala, Etikehelgalla, Ettukal, Ettukala, Etulkotte, Evariwatta, Ewariwatta

== F ==
Fort (Colombo)

== G ==
Galagedara, Galahitiyawa, Galboda, Galborella, Galedanda, Galewatta, Galgamuwa, Galgomuwa, Galhena, Galhetiya Grand Pass

== H ==
Habarakada, Haddagoda, Hakgalla, Hakkurukumbura, Hakurukumbura, Hakwadunna, Halanduruwa, Halapitiya, Halawegoda, Halgampitiya, Hanwella, Hokandara, Horana, Homagama

== I ==
Iddagoda, Ihala Hewessa, Ihala Imbulgoda, Ihala Karannagoda, Ihala Naragala, Ihala Neboda, Ihala Wadugoda, Ihala Welgama, Ihalapanangala, Ihalayagoda, Ingiriya

== J ==
Ja-Ela, Jaligoda, Jaltara, Jambugaswadiya, Jambureliya, Jawatta, Josnell

== K ==
Kirindiwela, Kadawatha, Kalutara, Kumbuka, Kahatapitiya, Kiribathgoda, Kottawa, Kaduwela, Kaubedda, Kandana Kotahena

== L ==
Labugama, Ladduwa, Langana, Lansiyawatta, Lathpandura, Latpandura, Laulupitiya, Lenagala, Lenewara, Leuwanduwa

== M ==
Mabima, Mabima, Mabodale, Mabogoda, Mabole, Mabula, Mabulgoda, Madabaddara, Madabawita, Madakada, Maggona, Maharagama, Malabe, Mathugama, Mount Lavinia

== N ==
Nittambuwa, Nugegoda

== O ==
Obberiya, Ogodapola, Okanduwa, Olabaduwa, Olaboduwa, Omatta, Opalla, Opata, Opatha, Opathella

== P ==
Panadura, Padukka

== Q ==
None

== R ==
Radamulla, Radawadunna, Radawana, Raddalgoda, Raddegoda, Raddoluwa, Ragama, Rajagiriya, Rambukkana, Ramminike, Ratmalana

== S ==
Samanabedda, Samanabedde, Sambagama, Sangarama, Sapugaskanda, Sapugaskande, Sarikamulla, Sarikkamulla, Sayakkaramulla, Sedawatta

== T ==
Tabuwana, Talagala, Talagama, Talahena, Talahena, Talahera, Talahitiya, Talangama, Talangama North, Talangama South

== U ==
Uda Kanugala, Udagama, Udagama, Udaganella, Udahamulla, Udahamulupattiya, Udakamanpella, Udakamanpelle, Udakananpella, Udamapitigama

== V ==
Vavulagallana, Veyangoda, Vitanamulla

== W ==
Waddegoda, Wadduwa, Wadugama, Wadugoda, Wadumulla, Wadumulla, Wadurawa, Waduruwa, Waga

== X ==
None

== Y ==
Yakkala, Yatiyanthota

== Z ==
None

== See also ==
- List of cities in Sri Lanka
- List of towns in Sri Lanka
