= Polmalagama =

- Village
- Location within Sri Lanka
- Coordinates: 7°08′N 80°33′E
- Country: Sri Lanka
- Province: Central Province
- Elevation: 2,618 ft (798 m)
- Time zone: UTC+5:30 (Sri Lanka Standard Time)

Polmalagama is a village in Central Province, Sri Lanka, situated about 8.3 kilometres (5.2 mi) southwest of the town of Gampola by road. The principal landmark of note is the Polmalagama Bodhiya temple.

== History ==
Polmalagama is listed in the 1898 A Gazetteer of the Central Province of Ceylon by Archibald Campbell Lawrie who states that the village belonged to the Ganga Ihala korale of Udapalata and at the time of the 1871 census, it was grouped together with Telihunna. In 1881, Telihunna had a population of 217 people. Lawrie also mentions a hamlet named Galpaya in the vicinity.

== Geography and climate ==
Polmalagama is situated in southern central Sri Lanka at an altitude of 798 metres (2,618 ft), about 8.3 kilometres (5.2 mi) southwest of the town of Gampola, 2.8 kilometres (1.7 mi) northeast of the village of Mitalawa and 1.6 kilometres (0.99 mi) southwest of the village of Alugolla by road.

A tropical rainforest climate prevails in the region. The average annual temperature in the region is 21 °C (70 °F). The hottest month is March, when the average temperature is 23 °C, and the coldest is July, with 19 °C. Average annual rainfall is 2481 millimeters. The rainiest month is December, with an average of 427 mm of precipitation, and the driest is July, with 98 mm of precipitation.

== Landmarks ==
The principal landmark is the Polmalagama Bodhiya temple. Malangamuwa Bridge lies along the main road between the village and Mitalawa. To the west of the village lies the Thennewaththa Estate plantation.

== See also ==
- List of towns in Central Province, Sri Lanka
