= Kalagolla =

Coordinates: 7°12′N 80°59′E

- Village
- Interactive map of Kalagolla
- Country: Sri Lanka
- Province: Uva Province
- District: Badulla District
- Time zone: UTC+5:30 (Sri Lanka Standard Time)

Kalagolla is a village in Sri Lanka. It is located within Uva Province.

== See also ==
- List of settlements in Uva Province
