= Berawila =

Coordinates: 7°07′N 80°28′E

- Village
- Interactive map of Berawila
- Country: Sri Lanka
- Province: Sabaragamuwa Province
- Time zone: UTC+5:30 (Sri Lanka Standard Time)

Berawila is a village in Sri Lanka. It is located within Sabaragamuwa Province.

== See also ==
- List of settlements in Sabaragamuwa Province
