= Anthony Leopold Raymond Peiris =

Sri Lankan Roman Catholic bishop

- Bishop of Kurunegala
- Church: Catholic Church
- Diocese: Diocese of Kurunegala
- In office: 15 May 1987 – 14 May 2009
- Predecessor: Diocese erected
- Successor: Harold Anthony Perera

Orders
- Ordination: 20 December 1958 by Thomas Cooray
- Consecration: 18 July 1987 by Nicholas Fernando

Personal details
- Born: 9 August 1932 Kalaeliya (east of Bopitiya), Western Province, Island of Ceylon and its Dependencies, British Empire
- Died: 29 September 2017 (aged 85) Kurunegala, North Western Province, Sri Lanka

Anthony Leopold Raymond Peiris (9 August 1932 – 29 September 2017) was a Roman Catholic bishop.

Ordained to the priesthood in 1958, Peiris served as bishop of the Roman Catholic Diocese of Kurunegala, Sri Lanka, from 1987 until 2009.

== See also ==
- Catholic Church in Sri Lanka
