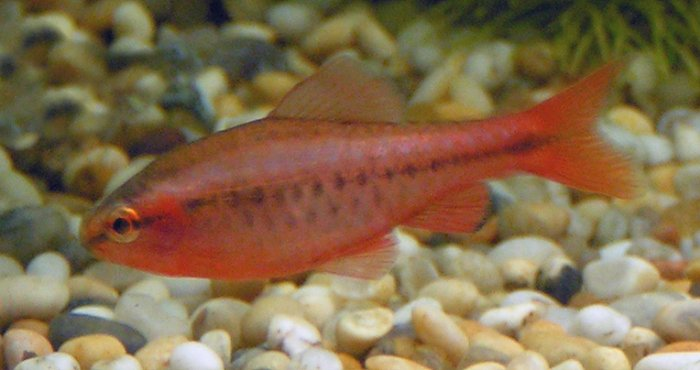

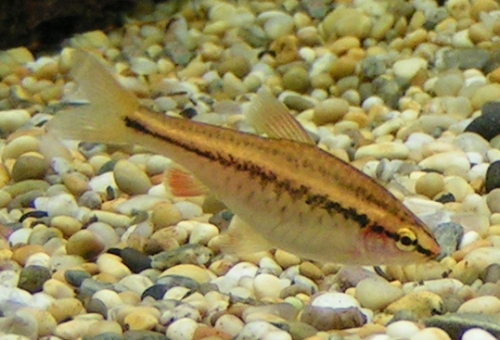
- male above, female below

Conservation status
- Vulnerable (IUCN 3.1)

Scientific classification
- Kingdom: Animalia
- Phylum: Chordata
- Class: Actinopterygii
- Division: Teleostei
- Order: Cypriniformes
- Family: Cyprinidae
- Subfamily: Smiliogastrinae
- Genus: Rohanella; Sudasinghe, Rüber & Meegaskumbura,
- Species: R. titteya

Binomial name
- Rohanella titteya Deraniyagala, 1929

Synonyms
- Puntius titteya Deraniyagala, 1929 Barbus titteya (Deraniyagala, 1929); Capoeta titteya (Deraniyagala, 1929)

= Cherry barb =

Species of fish

The cherry barb (Rohanella titteya) is a tropical freshwater fish belonging to the family Cyprinidae. It is endemic to Sri Lanka, and introduced populations have become established in Mexico and Colombia. The cherry barb was named Puntius titteya by Paules Edward Pieris Deraniyagala in 1929. Synonyms include Barbus titteya and Capoeta titteya. It is the only species in the genus Rohanella.

The species is commercially important in the aquarium trade and farmed in larger numbers, but it remains threatened by overcollection and habitat loss. Cherry barbs are very popular aquarium fish, due to their vibrant red colors.

== Taxonomy ==
The cherry barb was first formally described as Puntius titteya in 1929 by the Sri Lankan naturalist Paul E. P. Deraniyagala with its type locality given as Ambagaspitiya in Sri Lanka. In 2023 Hiranya Sudasinghe, Lukas Rüber and Madhava Meegaskumbura proposed that this species be classified within the new monospecific genus Rohanella. This taxon is classified within the subfamily Smiliogastrinae within the family Cyprinidae.

== Etymology ==
The cherry barb is the only species in the genus Rohanella, this name honours the Sri Lankan biologist Rohan Pethiyagoda, who first recognised that some Sri Lankan barbs formerly classified in the genus Puntius should be reclassified in separate genera. The specific name tittaya is the Sinhala name for this fish.

== Description ==
The cherry barb is a small elongated fish with a relatively compressed body. It reaches 5 cm (2 in) in length. The female is fawn-colored on top with a slight greenish sheen. Its sides and belly have gleaming silver highlights. It may have a rosy tone on its back and upper sides. A horizontal stripe extends from the tip of the snout through the eye to the base of the caudal fin. The male has a reddish color, becoming very deep red when breeding, and a more slender body shape. The females have two pinkish color stripes down their sides, also becoming darker when ready to breed.

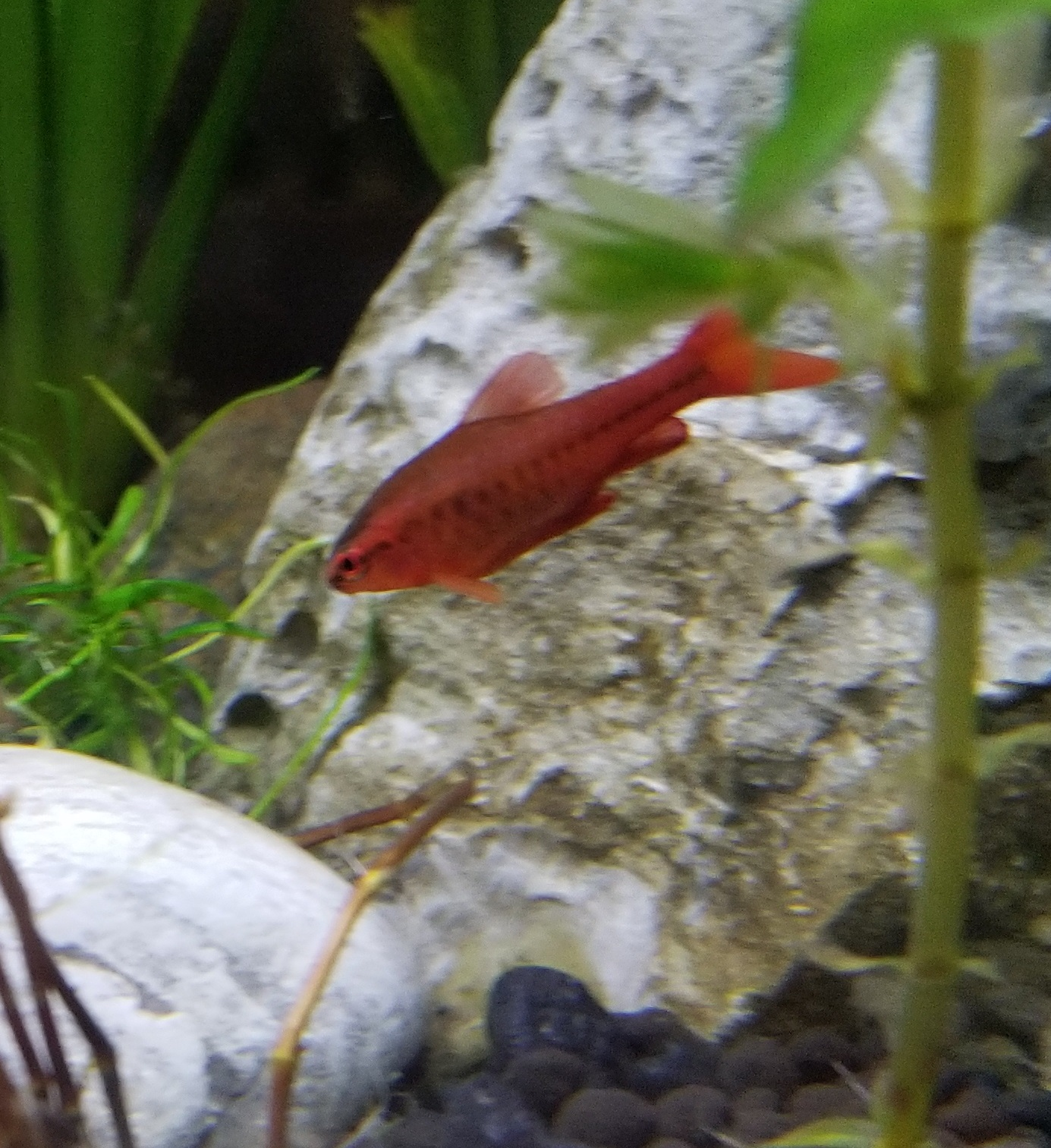
Male Cherry Barb

== Habitat ==
The cherry barb's natural habitat is a heavily shaded, shallow, and calm water body. Its native substrate is silty with leaf cover. It comes from a tropical climate and prefers water with a pH of 6 to 8, a water hardness (dH) of 5 to 19, and a temperature range of 73 to 81 °F (23 to 27 °C).

== In the aquarium ==
The fish is most often kept in community tanks by aquarium hobbyists. The cherry barb is a schooling fish and is best kept in groups of five or more individuals, though the schools are often less discrete than those of other barbs. Within these schools, there will most likely be a hierarchy. There should be a ratio of at least two females to one male. The male will constantly harass the females to breed, and if there are multiple females, each can escape the attention of the male for a time. The average life span is four years, with a maximum of around seven years. The tank should have abundant plant material (about two-thirds to three-quarters of the tank), but the fish also needs open space to swim. It tends to hide and will often withdraw under the cover of plants. The younger male is generally peaceful, but a mature male can be aggressive when breeding. Appropriate tankmates include Rasbora and similar calm fish.

== Breeding ==
When breeding, the male swims just behind the female, chasing away rival males. The female will spawn 200 to 300 eggs and scatter them on plants and the substrate. It may eat its own eggs and small fry. The eggs hatch in one to two days and the fry are free-swimming after two more days. After five weeks, the hatchlings will be about 1 cm. long and easily identifiable as cherry barbs.
