= Kammaltera =

Coordinates: 7°15′N 79°50′E

- Village
- Interactive map of Kammaltera
- Country: Sri Lanka
- Province: Western Province
- Time zone: UTC+5:30 (Sri Lanka Standard Time)

Kammaltera is a village in Sri Lanka. It is located within Western Province.

== See also ==
- List of towns in Western Province, Sri Lanka
