= History of Uva =

History of Uva Province, Sri Lanka

Sri Lanka is divided into nine provinces and Uva Province has a distinct place among them. The natural environment and the history of the province are the main reasons for this.

== Name ==
When the wind blows through the mountains, a "hoo" sound is generated. It is believed from the tales that the word "hoo-wa" is later transformed into "Uva". But how and when it is used is never mentioned.

== Establishment ==
In the 19th century Governor of Ceylon, Lord Arthur Hamilton-Gordon established the Uva province. Before that the divisions Bintenna, Wiyaluwa, Wellassa, Udukinda, Yatikinda belonged to Central Province and Wellawaya and Buttala belonged to the Southern Province.

== Administration divisions ==
The province had been divided into seven provincial financial control divisions

- Udukinda
- Yatikinda
- Buttala
- Wellawaya
- Wellassa
- Wiyaluwa
- Bintenna

=== Udukinda and Yatikinda ===
The word "Kinda" denotes the land. An area with a higher elevation is called "Udukinda" and an area with a lower elevation is called "Yatikinda"

The areas with a higher elevation, such as Pattipola, Ohiya, Haputale, Welimada, Gurutalawa, Ambewela and Ettampitiya were placed in "Udukinda". Areas with lower elevation such as Badulla, Passara, Lunugala, Demodara, Ella, Hali-Ela, Narangala and Spring-Vally were placed in "Yatikinda".

=== Buttala ===
During the era of King Dutugemunu the path way from Northern province to the southern province passed through Buttala. A free meal was given to people who travelled from the north to the south. The place where the free meal was given called "Bath Hala", and name "Bath Hala" was later transformed into "Buttala".

=== Wellawaya ===
When compared to the other divisions of the Uva province, Wellawaya area is very much closer to the sea. The area has a lower elevation and fewer mountains. Therefore, this area is touched with the wind from the sea, which was called "Welle Wayuwa". It is believed the name "Welle Wayuwa" later became "Wellawaya".

=== Bintenna ===
The large area around Mahiyangana was called "Bintenna".

=== Wiyaluwa ===
Bamboo trees were called as "Wiyalu". The area with a large number of bamboo trees, was named as "Wiyaluwa".

== Village Councils before 1950 ==
During and after the British Ceylon period, the Uva Province was administered as several Village Councils and Town Councils. Later these administration units were transformed into Municipal Councils, Urban Councils and Provincial Councils.

- Bintenna
- Palwatta Arulupitiya
- Oya Palatha
- Soranathota
- Wiyaluwa
- Dehivini Palata
- Dambavini Palatha
- Gampaha
- Meda Palatha
- Yati Palatha
- Uda Palatha
- Rilpola
- Kumbalwela
- Bogoda
- Passara
- Pattipola
- Wegam pattu Nilagala
- Medagam Pattu
- Dambagalla
- Buttala
- Wellawaya
- Kanda Pallena No 01
- Kandapallena No 02
- Kandukara
- Buttala Wedirata

== See also ==
- Uva Rebellion
- Keppetipola Disawe
- Battle of Randeniwela
