= Rathkarawwa =

Village in Badulla District, Sri Lanka

Coordinates: 6°48′17″N 80°54′24″E

Rathkarawwa (Sinhala: රත්කරව්ව) is a village in Welimada Divisional Secretariat in Badulla District, Sri Lanka with a population of about 1000. The nearest city to Rathkarawwa is Haputale, which is about 10 km in distance. Rathkarawwa is surrounded by Welimada, Haputale and Diyatalawa towns. Paddy and vegetable cultivation had been the main source of income for many families for decades.

== Population ==
The majority of the population are Sinhala Buddhist.

Total	Male	Female
921	477	444

(Source Welimada Divisional Secretariat 2008-statistics)

== Climate ==
Rathkarawwa belongs to the dry zone of Sri Lanka where less amount of rain is received throughout the year. The average temperature is 24 degrees Celsius during day time.

== Transport ==
134 is the main bus root number between Haputale and Welimada. 228 is the bus route between Boralanda and Bandarawela.

The nearest Railway station is at Haputale on the branch railway to Badulla.

== Postal Service ==
- Rathkarawwa Sub Post Office (Postal Code 90164)

== Schools ==
- B/Rathkarawwa Maha Vidyalaya
- B/Maligatenna Vidyalaya
- B/Gambedda Vidyalaya

== Places of worship ==
- Ratnayake Mudalindaramaya Temple Rathkarawwa
- Sri Dhammarakkitharamaya

== Notable people ==
- Rathkarawwe Medhananda Thero

== See also ==
- Towns in Uva
