= Yatapana =

Coordinates: 7°08′N 80°18′E

- Village
- Interactive map of Yatapana
- Country: Sri Lanka
- Province: Sabaragamuwa Province
- Time zone: UTC+5:30 (Sri Lanka Standard Time)

Yatapana is a village in Sabaragamuwa Province, Sri Lanka.

== See also ==
- List of settlements in Sabaragamuwa Province
