= Pananwala =

Coordinates: 6°59′N 80°02′E

- Village
- Interactive map of Pananwala
- Country: Sri Lanka
- Province: Western Province
- Time zone: UTC+5:30 (Sri Lanka Standard Time)

Pananwala is a village in Sri Lanka. It is located within the Western Province.

== See also ==
- List of towns in Western Province, Sri Lanka
