= Kalalpitiya =

- Village
- Interactive map of Kalalpitiya
- Coordinates: 7°25′28″N 80°37′02″E
- Country: Sri Lanka
- Province: Western Province
- Time zone: UTC+5:30 (Sri Lanka Standard Time)

Kalalpitiya is a village in Sri Lanka. It is located within Central Province.

== See also ==
- List of towns in Western Province, Sri Lanka
