= Waduwadeniya =

- Interactive map of Waduwadeniya
- Country: Sri Lanka
- Province: Sabaragamuva Province
- Time zone: UTC+5:30 (Sri Lanka Standard Time)

Waduwadeniya is a Grama Niladhari District in Sri Lanka, census code 11G. It is located within Sabaragamuva Province.

== See also ==
- List of towns in Sabaragamuwa
