= Weragama =

- Village
- Interactive map of Weragama
- Country: Sri Lanka
- Province: Sabaragamuwa Province
- Time zone: UTC+5:30 (Sri Lanka Standard Time)

Weragama is a village in Sri Lanka, located within Sabaragamuwa Province.

Weragama Walauwa belongs to the descendants of William Harold Weragama and Amitha Katugaha in Ratnapura Sri Lanka. The village was a gift from the king for the services by the family. The mansion still stands in the village.

== See also ==
- List of settlements in Sabaragamuwa Province
