= Mabula =

Mabula is a surname. Notable people with the surname include:

- Angeline Mabula (born 1962), Tanzanian politician
- Joseph Mabula, Zambian bishop
- Tukiya Kankasa-Mabula, Zambian lawyer
- Jean-Pierre Mabula Hakiri (born 1987), Rwandan footballer
