= Muppane =

Muppane මුප්පනේ
- Town
- Location in Sri Lanka
- Coordinates: 6°52′59″N 81°22′0″E
- Country: Sri Lanka
- Province: Uva Province
- District: Monaragala District
- Established: 1920
- Elevation: 392 m (1,286 ft)
- Time zone: UTC+5:30 (Sri Lanka Standard Time)

Muppane (Sinhala: මුප්පනේ) is a town located in Monaragala District, Uva Province of Sri Lanka. It is located 168 km (104 mi) east of Colombo and 57.5 km (35.7 mi) east of Badulla (the capital city of Uva Province).

The area was developed for rubber cultivation in the early 1900s and the town expanded considerably after the bridging and improvement of the road from Wellawaya.

== Heritage and cultural attractions ==
Muppane Rajamaha Vihara, also known as Viharamulla Vihara, is a Buddhist temple is located in Muppane. It is gazetted as an Archaeological Protected Site by the government in June 2008. The two-storey temple is 10 m (33 ft) long and 6.1 m (20 ft) wide, with an inner chamber, 4.6 m (15 ft) by 2.73 m (9.0 ft). It was built in the early Kandy period, based on the paintings and the sculptures of the same period found adorning the temple building.

== See also ==
- List of towns in Uva
