= Teaching Hospital Kurunegala =

Teaching Hospital Kurunegala ශික්ෂණ රෝහල - කුරුණෑගල
- Ministry of Health, Sri Lanka
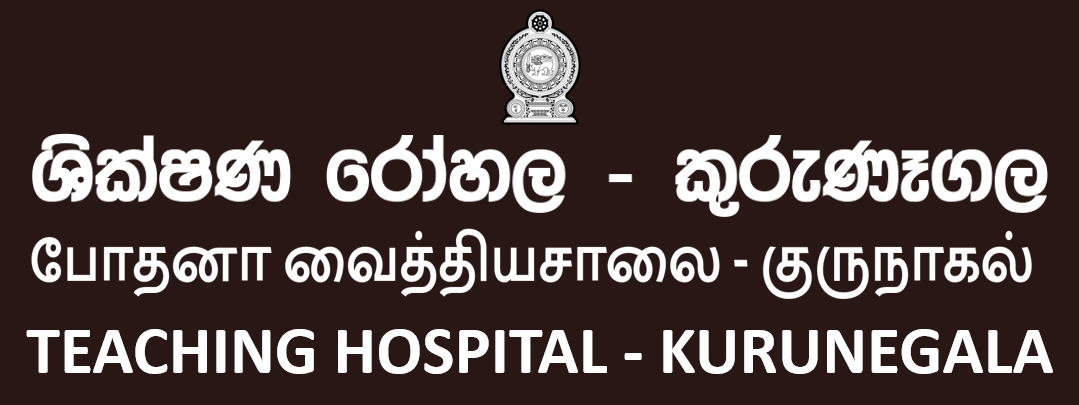

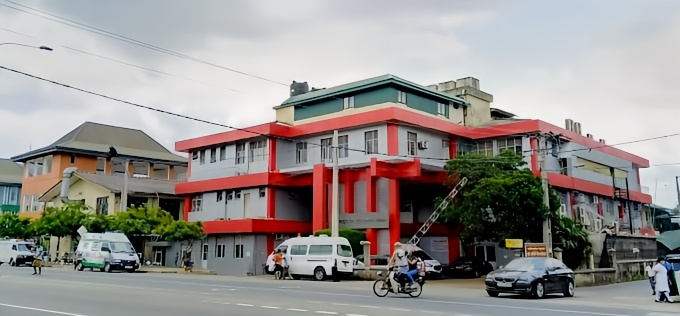

Geography
- Location: Kurunegala, North Western Province, Sri Lanka
- Coordinates: 7°28′44.7456″N 80°21′32.904″E

Organisation
- Care system: Public
- Type: Teaching
- Affiliated university: Wayamba University of Sri Lanka

Services
- Emergency department: Yes

Links
- Lists: Hospitals in Sri Lanka

The Teaching Hospital Kurunegala (THK) , previously known as Kurunegala Provincial General Hospital, is a teaching hospital in Kurunegala, North Western Province, Sri Lanka. As of 2021, it was the third largest hospital in the country, with more than 2300 beds and more than 3500 staff. The hospital is set on 35 acres of land and contains more than 100 units. The hospital serves more than 1.2 million patients annually, including patients from others district, such as Anuradhapura District, Polonnaruwa District, Trincomalee District, and Mathale District.

== History and location ==
Teaching Hospital Kurunegala was established in the late 1890s. It is located approximately 0.75 km from the Kurunegala city center, along the Colombo–Kurunegala road.

== Status ==
In 2021, the hospital was officially reclassified as a Teaching Hospital through a gazette notification issued by the Ministry of Health. This status allows it to provide clinical training for undergraduate medical students, particularly those from the Faculty of Medicine, Wayamba University of Sri Lanka.
