= Kotiyagala =

Village in Monaragala District, Sri Lanka

- Village
- Interactive map of Kotiyagala
- Coordinates: 6°46′21″N 81°31′47″E
- Country: Sri Lanka
- Province: Uva
- District: Monaragala
- DS Division: Siyambalanduwa
- GN Division: Kotiyagala
- Time zone: UTC+05:30 (SLST)
- Postal code: 91024
- Area code: 055

Kotiyagala is a village in Sri Lanka, located in Monaragala District, Uva Province.

== Solar power project ==
On 8 February 2024, a power purchase agreement (PPA) was signed between Rividhanavi Ltd. and the Ceylon Electricity Board (CEB) for a 100 MW ground-mounted solar power project in Siyambalanduwa.

On 6 September 2025, the Sri Lankan government began construction of the US$140 million Rividanavi Solar Power Park in Kotiyagala, covering a land area of 500 acres (200 ha). It marks the country's largest renewable energy project to date. The project is scheduled to be completed in 2027 and will contribute 100 MW of capacity to the national electricity grid.

== See also ==
- List of settlements in Uva Province
