= Bogahakumbura =

Bogahakumbura බෝගහකුඹුර
- Location within Sri Lanka
- Coordinates: 6°51′43″N 80°52′35″E
- Province: Uva Province
- District: Badulla
- Divisional Secretariat: Welimada

Area
  - Land: 9 km^{2} (3.5 sq mi)
  - Water: .5 km^{2} (0.19 sq mi)

Population
  - Total: 1,500
- Time zone: UTC+5:30 (Sri Lanka Standard Time Zone)
- Postal Code: 90354

Bogahakumbura (බෝගහකුඹුර in Sinhala language) is a rural town in Sri Lanka. It is located in Badulla District of Uva Province, Sri Lanka. Majority of people in the area are involved with vegetable cultivation.

This town is located between Haputale - Keppetipola main road. Haputale (17 km), Welimada (12 km), Bandarawela (18 km), Nuwaraeliya (26 km) and Diyatalawa(12 km) are closest major towns from Bogahakumbura. Boralanda (6 km), Keppetipola (6 km/7 km) are the closest minor towns for bogahakumbura. The Grama Niladhari Division of the Bogahakumbura is 51.

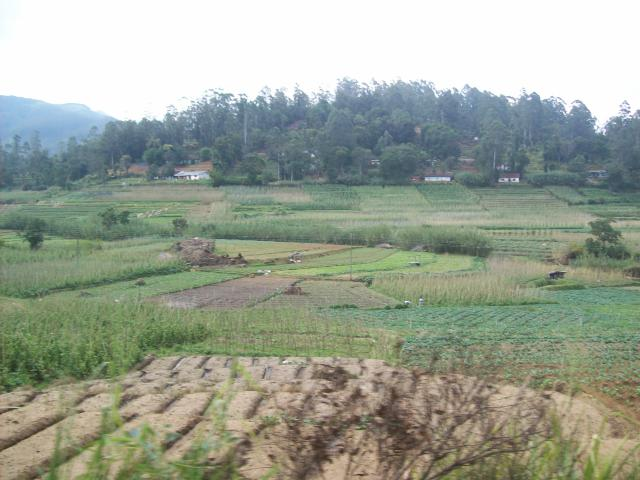
Vegetable cultivation around the Bogahakumbura area

Bogahakumbura town is rapidly growing town in Welimada Area. Most closer reason for that is large number of vegetable amount cultivated daily and bidding in the town. About 50 lorries are come from Dambulla, Keppetipola, Bandarawela, Marata, Hambantota, Wellawaya, Ampara and some other places to buy vegetables. About 25 vegetable bidding centers are available in the town. Alawathugoda, Wangiyakumbura, Kandepuhulpola, Pahala Ambewela, Gatalagamuwa, Kirindi Ela, Hewanakumbura, Kalabululanda and Alugolla people visit this town daily. Government schools, police station, base hospital, temples, all kinds of shops, banks and post office are available.

== Government institutions ==
There are several government institutes are available in Bogahakumbura city.

- Bogahakumbura - Base Hospital
  - Telephone (0094) 057 2280 361
- Bogahakumbura Police Station
  - Address - Alawathugoda Rd, Alawathugoda, Bogahakumbura
  - Telephone (0094)(057) 2281 221
- Sub Post Office (90354)
- Bank of Ceylon with ATM
- Peoples' Bank
- Samuddhi Development Bank
- Regional Development Bank
- Govijana Seva Center
- Bogahakumbura Maha Vidyalaya
- Bogahakumbura Muslim Vidyalaya

== Grama Niladhari Divisions ==
Below Grama Niladhari divisions are bounded with Bogahakumbura town

- Bibiligamuwa (50J)
- Bogahakubura (51)
- Kalubululanda (51A)
- Kandepuhulpola (51C)
- Alawathugoda (51D)
- Alugolla (61B)

== Places ==
- Udakirinda Vipassana Bhawana Center is a meditation center closed to Bogahakumbura town. There are about 4 kilometers from the town.
- Udamala Mountain is a peak between Bogahakumbura and Pattipola village. There are about 8 kilometers from the town.
- Diyawatanalla Waterfall is a waterfall closed to Bogahakumbura town. About 2 km to the waterfall from Bogahakumbura. This waterfall is at Alawathugoda village.

== Tourist attractions ==
There are several tourist attractions closed to Bogahakumbura town.

- Adisham Bungalow - Haputale (15 km)
- Ohiya (17 km)
- Horton Plains (25 km)
- Nuwaraeliya (26 km)
- Hakgala Botanical Garden (22 km)
- Bomburu Ella Waterfalls (28 km)
- Fox Hill Track - Diyathalawa (18 km)
- Boralanda Farm (6 km)
- Ambewela (24 km)
- 18th Railway Tunnel (5 km)
- Railway Summit Level (6 km)
- Diyawatanalla Waterfall (2 km)

== Postal services ==
- Bogahakumbura Sub Post Office
  - Postal code 90354
  - Telephone (0094)(057) 228 0350

== See also ==
- Towns in Uva
