= Pallewela =

Pallewela පල්ලේවෙල பலலேவெலை
- Town
- Location in Sri Lanka
- Coordinates: 7.1967°N 80.0940°E
- Country: Sri Lanka
- Province: Western Province
- District: Gampaha District
- Time zone: UTC+5:30 (Sri Lanka Standard Time)
- Postal code: 11150

Pallewela (Sinhala: පල්ලේවෙල, Tamil: பலலேவெலை) is a town in Sri Lanka. It is located within Gampaha District, Western Province. Pallewela is popular for Ayurveda doctors. It is located 51 km from a Colombo and 32 km from Negombo. Pallewela has produced so many remarkable people to the world.

== See also ==
- List of towns in Western Province, Sri Lanka
- Mirigama
