= Bibile =

Coordinates: 7.16°N 81.22°E

Bibile බිබිලේ (Bibila)
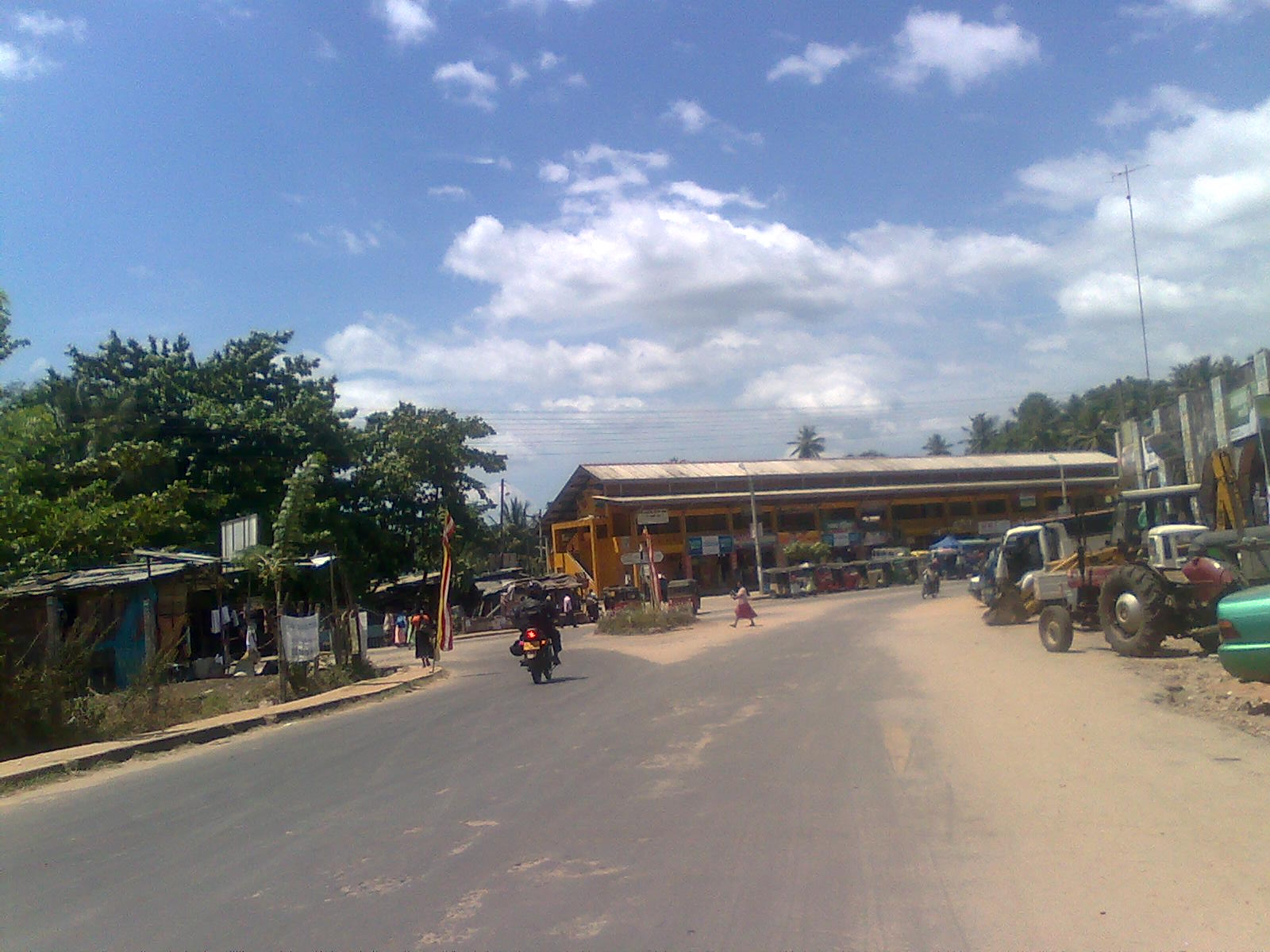
- Bibile Town
- Interactive map of Bibile
- Country: Sri Lanka
- Province: Uva Province
- District: Monaragala District
- Time zone: UTC+05:30 (Sri Lanka Time)
- Postal code: 91500

Bibile (also Bibila) is a tourist destination located in Monaragala District, Uva Province of Sri Lanka. It was called Wellassa during the Kandy kingdom, which related to 100,000 paddy fields. The agricultural region was historically known for cultivating rice and a variety of orange (citrus sinensis) called Bibile Sweet.

== Population ==
As of 2012, the total population of Bibile was 40,329. Sinhalese people-95.1%

== Economy ==
In the 1990s, gem shops were opening on the main high street in Bibile. Mining near Bibile has extracted geuda and yellow sapphire.

In recent years, local corn farmers have opposed attempts by foreign multinationals to acquire agricultural lands to build a sugar factory.

The Dorapoda mountain ranges, the Kotasara Piyangala Raja Maha Viharaya temple, and Mallipotha lake are local to the area. Little Worlds End looks over Kotagama village through Dorapoda mountain ranges.

== Education ==
Bibile Madya Maha Vidayalaya (known as Wellassa National College) is one of the main schools in bibile.

In 2024, the DP Foundation opened what it billed as the "Sri Lanka's first digital pre-school" in Bibile, as well as an IT campus at Bibile Wagama Sri Saddaramalankara Pirivena.

== In popular culture ==
Bibile was known as 'Sinhale' in Martin Wickremesinghe's novel "Gamperaliya".

== Notable people ==
- Professor Senaka Bibile, whose father was from Bibile
- Sarath Kotagama

== See also ==
- List of towns in Uva
