= Deldeniya =

Deldeniya Sinhala: දෙල්දෙණිය
- Village
- Country: Sri Lanka
- Province: Central Province
- Time zone: UTC+5:30 (Sri Lanka Standard Time)

Deldeniya (Sinhala: දෙල්දෙණිය) is a village in Sri Lanka. It is located within Central Province.

== See also ==
- List of towns in Central Province, Sri Lanka
