= Kadigamuwa =

- Interactive map of Kadigamuwa
- Country: Sri Lanka
- Province: Sabaragamuwa Province
- Time zone: UTC+5:30 (Sri Lanka Standard Time)

Kadigamuwa is a small town in Sri Lanka. It is located within Sabaragamuwa Province.

== See also ==
- List of towns in Central Province, Sri Lanka
