= Geuda =

Gemstone

Geuda (ගෙවුඩ, pronounced gay-yoo-dah) is a form of the mineral corundum, or sapphire, found primarily in Sri Lanka. Around 70%-80% of gems mined in Sri Lanka belong to geuda varieties. Because of its semitransparent and milky appearance due to rutile inclusions, these stones have little value as gemstones in their natural state.

Geuda was frequently stored in large drums or used to gravel home gardens prior to the 1970s discovery that heat treatment can drastically alter the stone's color.

Some geuda varieties turn to a blue color after heat treatments. Others turn to red after oxidizing. Kowangu pushparaga turns to yellow sapphire after oxidizing. After heating geuda to roughly 1800 °C, the aluminium oxide lattice-work of the gem is disrupted and cooling greatly improves both color and clarity. Though many stones are destroyed by the heating and cooling process, those that survive are significantly altered and rival naturally blue sapphires in both appearance and price.
