= Palagolla =

Coordinates: 6°56′N 81°08′E

- Village
- Interactive map of Palagolla
- Country: Sri Lanka
- Province: Uva Province
- Time zone: UTC+5:30 (Sri Lanka Standard Time)

Palagolla is a village in Sri Lanka. It is located within Uva Province.
