= Ellakkala, Sri Lanka =

Coordinates: 7°09′N 80°07′E

Ellakkala එල්ලක්කල நோக்கமாகக்
- suburb
- Interactive map of Ellakkala
- Country: Sri Lanka
- Province: Western Province
- Time zone: UTC+5:30 (Sri Lanka Standard Time)

Ellakkala (Sinhala: එල්ලක්කල, Tamil: நோக்கமாகக்) is a suburb close to Nittambuwa in Gampaha Administrative District. It is located about 6.9 km (4 mi) northeast of Nittambuwa.

It is located on the Colombo Kandy A1 highway approximately 3 km (2 mi) from the Pasyala Junction. Most Ellakkala lands are within Attanagalle Pradeshiya Sabha while some parts within Mirigama Pradeshiya Sabha. Specially lands are between Ellakkala and Meevitiya.

Adjoining suburbs are Haggalla, Walaliyedda, Godagama, Meevitiya, Katakaalapitiya, Allalamulla and Ma-Imbula.

== Attractions ==
Traditional Pattini Dewol is a famous site in December. There are many parades. Patthini Devalaya, Ma-imbula, paddy terraces, Ellakkala Buddhist nuns monastery, Buddhist monastery at Weralugaslanda, Buddhist Vihara at Meevitiya.

== Education ==
Ellakkala Maha Vidyalaya is the only Government-funded school in the area which accommodates students from Grade 1 to Grade 13.

== Administrative divisions ==
GN Division	Name of the G.N.	Office
355 Ellakkala	K.A. Gunawardana	Ellakkala G.N. Office
355A Ellakkala	K.A. Gunawardana	Godagama G.N. Office

Ellakkala Post Code
11116

== Climate ==
Ellakkala features a tropical rainforest climate. Has no true dry season, though it is noticeably drier in the months of January and February. When it compares with many areas with this type of climate, temperatures show little variation throughout the year. Average temperatures hovers at around 26 °C throughout the year.

Month	January	February	March	April	May	June	July	August	September	October	November	December
Ave Temperature °C	25	26	27	27	27	27	26	26	26	26	25	24
Precipitation centimeters	10.3	8.1	8.5	21.5	20.2	11.02	7.03	5.2	21.01	22.6	7.1	5.1
