= Jean-Pierre Mabula Hakiri =

Rwandan footballer

Personal information
- Date of birth: 15 July 1987 (age 39)
- Position: Defender

Senior career*
Years	Team	Apps	(Gls)
–2010	Rayon Sports F.C.		
2010–2012	Mukura Victory Sports F.C.		
2012–2014	Kiyovu Sport Kigali		
2014–2016	AS Kigali		
2016	Sydney Olympic FC	3	(0)

International career
2009	Rwanda	3	(1)
- * Club domestic league appearances and goals

Jean-Pierre Mabula Hakiri (born 15 July 1987) is a Rwandan footballer who is last known to have played for Sydney Olympic in Australia in 2016.

== Australia ==
Participating in three test matches with Sydney Olympic in Australia in summer 2016, Hariri was bean training with them by the 3rd of July and was supposed to a seal a 2-year deal, debuting when Olympic conceded 0-2 to Rockdale City Suns, showing industrious efforts despite picking up a red card on the 75th minute.

== Personal life ==
The Rwandan is a Christian and married in 2015.
