= Bulugahapitiya =

- Village
- Interactive map of Bulugahapitiya
- Country: Sri Lanka
- Province: Sabaragamuwa Province
- Time zone: UTC+5:30 (Sri Lanka Standard Time)

Bulugahapitiya is a village in Sri Lanka. It is located within Central Province. it sits roughly 15 miles 25 Kilometers from the provincial capital of Kandy the B364 Highway passes through the center of the town

== See also ==
- List of towns in Central Province, Sri Lanka
