= Kandegama =

- Village
- Interactive map of Kandegama
- Coordinates: 7°10′52″N 81°5′59″E
- Country: Sri Lanka
- Province: Uva Province
- Time zone: UTC+5:30 (Sri Lanka Standard Time)

Kandegama is a village in Sri Lanka. It is located within Uva Province.
