= Mideniya =

Middeniya
- Village
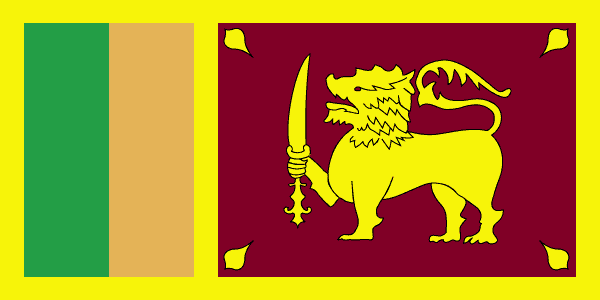
- Flag

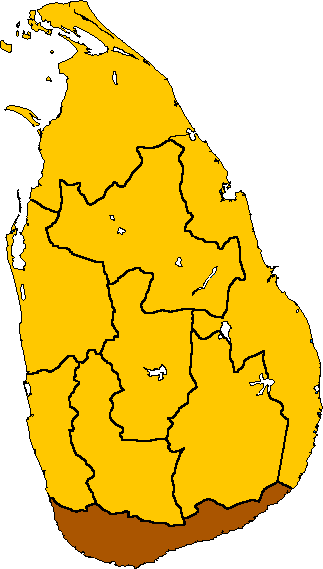
- Southern Province of Sri Lanka
- Country: Sri Lanka
- Province: Southern Province, Sri Lanka

Government
  - Governor of the Southern Province: Prof. William Wijesinghe Gamage
- Time zone: UTC+5:30 (Sri Lanka Standard Time)
- Postal code: 82270

Mideniya is a village in Sri Lanka. It is located in the Hambantota District in the Southern Province, Sri Lanka

It is falls under the purview o the governor of the Southern Province

== See also ==
- List of towns in Central Province, Sri Lanka
