= Iddamalgoda =

Iddamalgoda is a surname. Notable people with the surname include:

- Semini Iddamalgoda (born 1973), Sri Lankan actress
- Tharushan Iddamalgoda (born 1996), Sri Lankan cricketer
