= Boralanda =

- Town
- Location within Sri Lanka
- Coordinates: 6°49′44″N 80°53′39″E
- Country: Sri Lanka
- Province: Uva
- District: Badulla
- Time zone: UTC+5:30 (Sri Lanka Standard Time Zone)

Boralanda (බොරලන්ද in Sinhala language) is a rural town in Sri Lanka. It is located in Badulla District of Uva Province, Sri Lanka.

The easiest access path to the Horton Plains National Park is fallen through Boralanda via Ohiya.

== Transport ==
Following bus routes are fallen through Boralanda

- Haputale - Welimada (134)
- Boralanda-Bandarawela (228 Via Diyatalawa)
- Welimada - Ohiya- Hortan Plains (B508)
- Boralanda - Welimada (311 via Bogahakumbura and Keppetipola)
- Haputale - Nuwaraeliya (via Bogahakumbura and Keppetipola)

== Government Institutions ==
- Agriculture Research Institute
- Post Office
- State Timber Corporation
- Government Medical Centre
- Police Training School

== Some important places around Boralanda ==
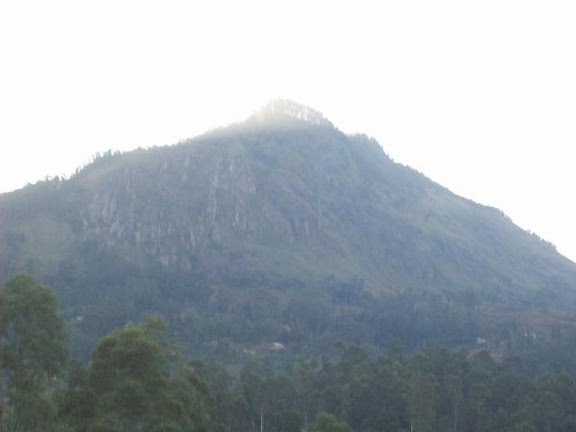
View of the Rahangala mountain

- Horton Plains National Park
- St. Thomas' College, Guruthalawa
- Ohiya
- Rahangala Peak
- Hinnarangolla Temple
- Boralanda Farm
- Welimada
- Haputale
- Diyatalawa
- Wangiyakumbura Temple

== See also ==
- Towns in Uva
