= Asgiriwalpola =

Asgiriwalpola අස්ගිරිවල්පොල அஸ்கிரிவால்போலா
- Village
- Location in Sri Lanka
- Coordinates: 7°7′0″N 79°59′0″E
- Country: Sri Lanka
- Province: Western Province
- District: Gampaha District
- Divisional Secretariat: Minuwangoda Divisional Secretariat
- Time zone: UTC+5.30 (SLST)
- Postal code: 11030
- Area code: 033

Asgiriwalpola (Sinhala: අස්ගිරිවල්පොල, Tamil: அஸ்கிரிவால்போலா) is a small village in Minuwangoda Divisional Secretariat of Gampaha District, Western Province, Sri Lanka.

== See also ==
- Udugampola
