= Ohiya =

- Village
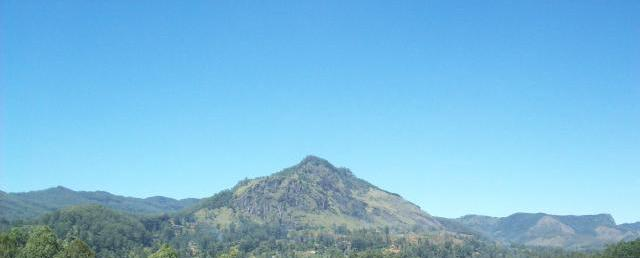
- Ohiya, Rahangala Mountain, Pattipola and Horton Plains area (view from Boralanda)

- Location within Sri Lanka
- Coordinates: 6°49′11″N 80°50′21″E
- Country: Sri Lanka
- Province: Uva Province
- Elevation: 1,774 m (5,820 ft)
- Time zone: UTC+5:30 (Sri Lanka Standard Time Zone)
- Postcode: 90168

Ohiya (Sinhala: ඔහිය) is a rural village located in Badulla District of Uva Province, Sri Lanka. It is located approximately 224 km (139 mi) southeast of Colombo. Ohiya is in the Welimada Divisional Secretariat Division and the Grama Niladhari Division number is 62A.

It is the nearest major settlement to the Horton Plains National Park and serves as a gateway to the National Park and several other nature reserves.

== Population ==
Total	Male	Female
697	332	365

(Source Welimada Divisional Secretariat 2008-statistics)

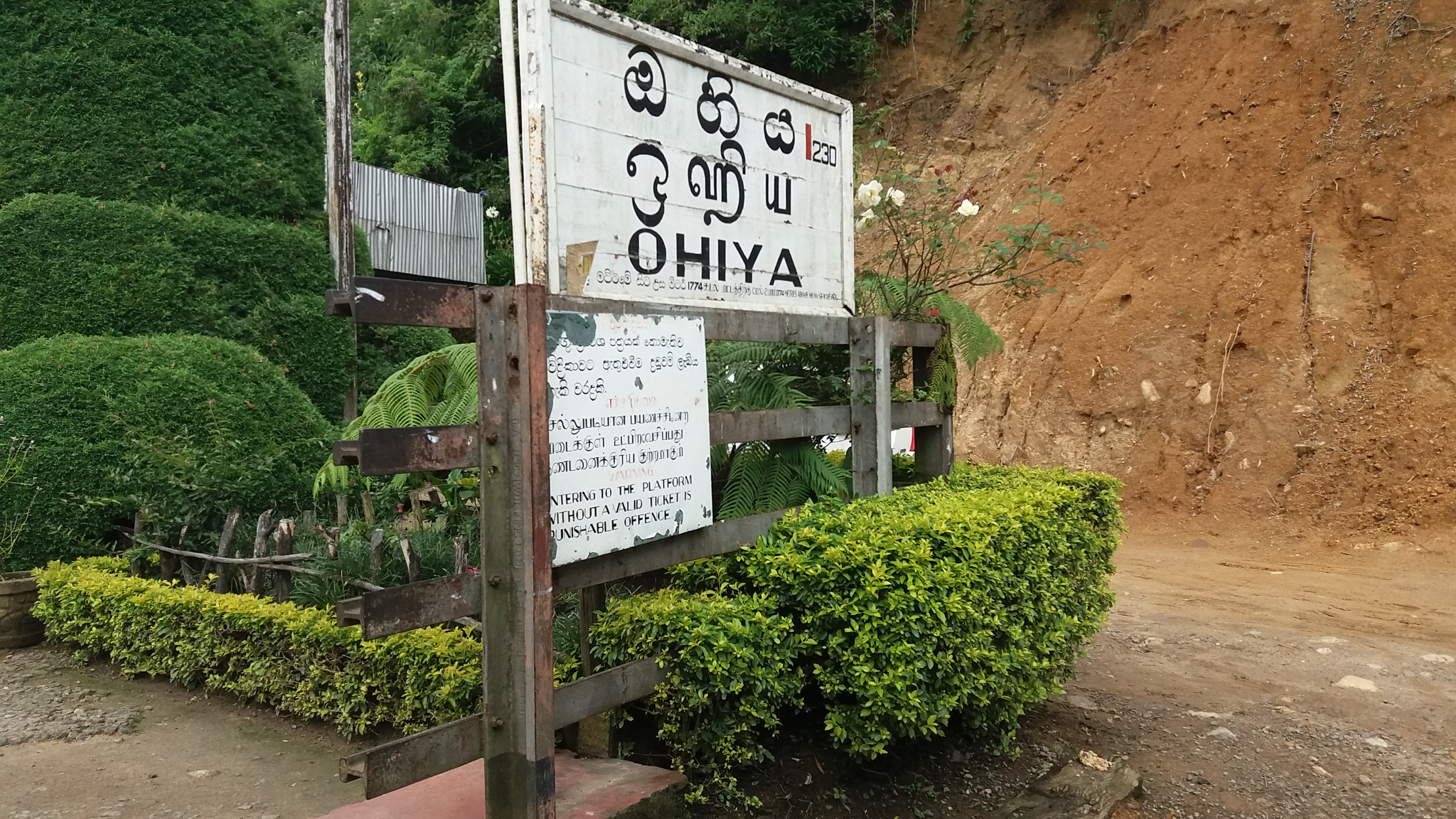
Ohiya Railway Station

== Transport ==
- Ohiya Railway Station is the 67th station on the Main line (which runs between Colombo and Badulla) It is the third highest railway station of Sri Lanka, situated 1,774 m (5,820 ft) above sea level and opened in 1893.
- B508 – Welimada – Ohiya (Bus route via Boralanda)

== Attractions ==
- Horton Plains National Park – located eight kilometres (five miles) from Ohiya
- Ohiya Gap/Dondra Watch, from this vantage point, which looks out over the Haputale valley, the Dondra Head Lighthouse (101 km or 63 mi) is occasionally visible.
- Ohiya Forest
- The Devil's Staircase, a road which drops down 1,100 m (3,600 ft) in less than 12 kilometres (7 mi) is located beyond Udaweria Estate about 8 km from the station
- Bamabarakanda Falls, the highest waterfall (263 m or 863 ft) in the country, is located 22 km (14 mi) from Ohiya
- Rahangala Mountain – located 8 km (5 mi) from Ohiya
- Kirigalpoththa – the second-highest summit in Sri Lanka

== Schools ==
- B/Ohiya Siddharatha Vidyalaya

== See also ==
- Towns in Uva
- History of Uva Province

== Railway Line Continuity ==
Preceding station	Sri Lanka Railways	Following station
Idalgashinna	Main Line	Pattipola
