= Walakumbura =

- Village
- Interactive map of Walakumbura
- Coordinates: 7.318°N 80.270°E
- Country: Sri Lanka
- Province: Central Province
- Time zone: UTC+5:30 (Sri Lanka Standard Time)

Walakumbura is a village in Sri Lanka. It is located within Central Province.

== See also ==
- List of towns in Central Province, Sri Lanka
