= Labugama =

Labugama ලබුගම லாபுகம
- Village
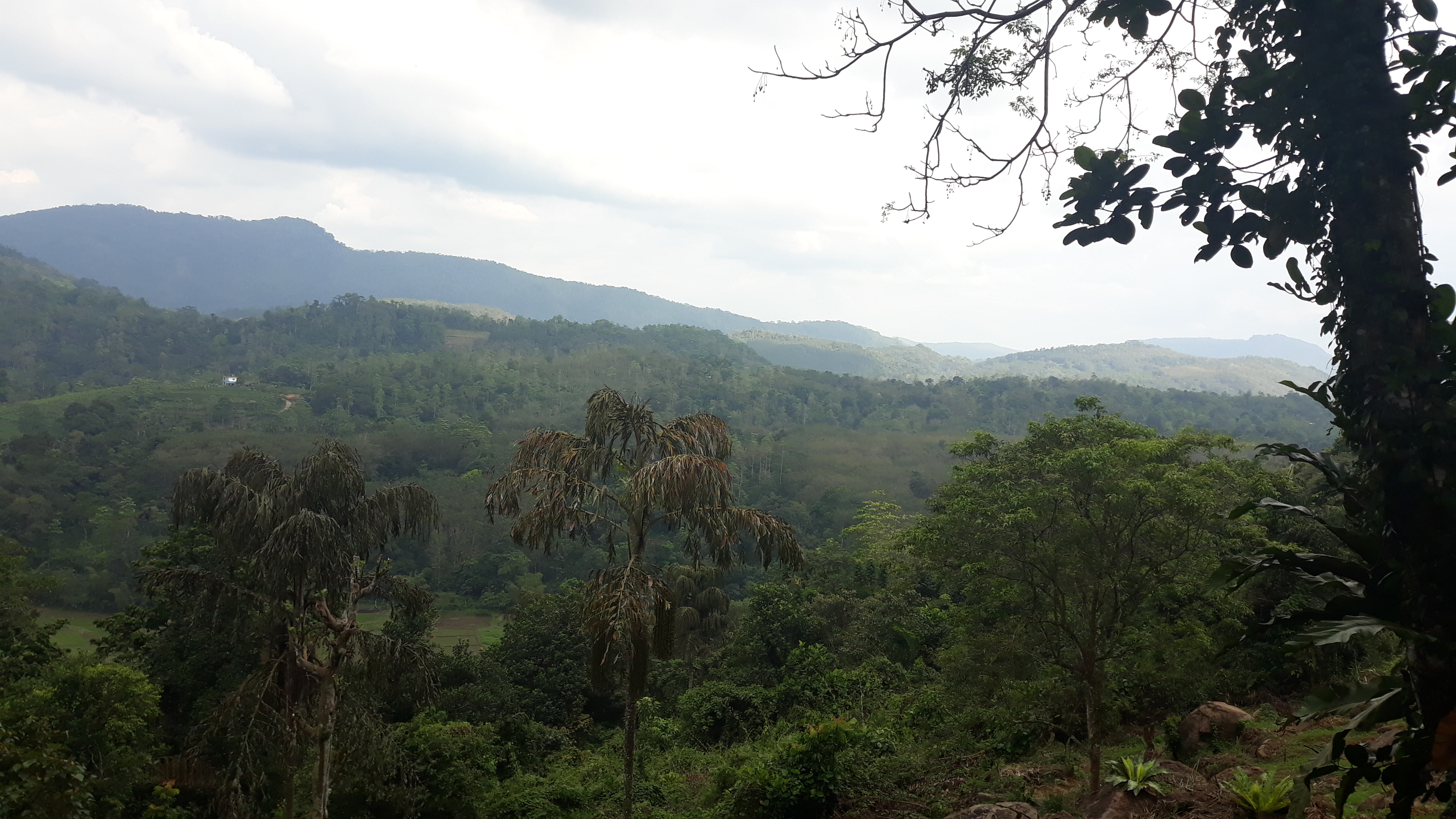
- Labugama
- Country: Sri Lanka
- Province: Western Province
- Time zone: UTC+5:30 (Sri Lanka Standard Time)

Labugama (Sinhala: ලබුගම, Tamil: லாபுகம) is a village in Sri Lanka. It is located within Western Province.

== See also ==
- List of towns in Western Province, Sri Lanka
