= Keppetipola =

- Location within Sri Lanka
- Coordinates: 6°52′51″N 80°52′44″E
- Province: Uva Province
- Time zone: UTC+5:30 (Sri Lanka Standard Time Zone)
  - Summer (DST): UTC+6 (Summer time)

Keppetipola (කැප්පෙටිපොල) is a town in Sri Lanka. It is located in Badulla District of Uva Province, Sri Lanka. During the British period this village had been called as Wilson-Tenna. In 1818 the British General named Wilson destroyed and abandoned this arid. Then this was called Palugama. And later somewhere in 1968 this had been named as Keppetipola. This had been done in honour and to commemorate the action of Monarawila keppetipola's ( then Disawa of Uva under the British ) return of the British troops and Armour and joining and taking the leadership of the 1818 rebellion against the British.

== Places of interest ==
- Ancient Dagoba at Sri Somananda Pirivena.
- Ancient fortress.

== See also ==
- Towns in Uva
- History of Uva Province
- Monarawila Keppetipola Disawe
