= Beddegama =

Coordinates: 6.1688°N 80.1794°E

- Village
- Interactive map of Beddegama
- Country: Sri Lanka
- Province: Southern Province
- Time zone: UTC+5:30 (Sri Lanka Standard Time)

Beddegama is a village in Sri Lanka. It is located within Southern Province.

== See also ==
- List of towns in Southern Province, Sri Lanka
