= Ambepitiya =

Ambepitiya is a surname. Notable people with the surname include:

- Sarath Ambepitiya (1946–2004), Sri Lankan judge
- Shehan Ambepitiya (born 1990), Sri Lankan sprinter
