= Ekiriya =

- Village
- Interactive map of Ekiriya
- Country: Sri Lanka
- Province: Central Province
- Time zone: UTC+5:30 (Sri Lanka Standard Time)
- Postal code: 20732

Ekiriya is a village in Sri Lanka. It is located within Central Province. All the people living in Ekiriya are buddhist.

Postal Code : 20732

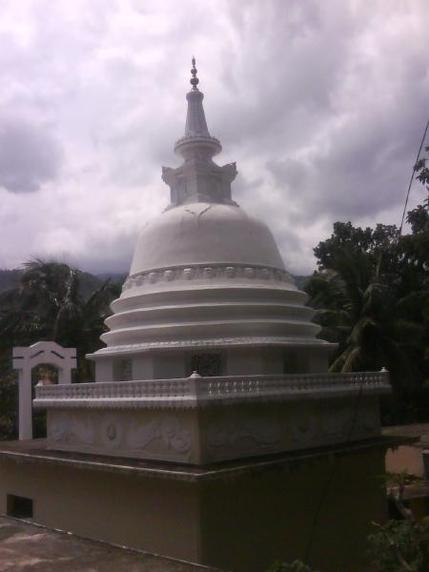
Sri Nigrodarama Viharaya, Pahalagama, Ekiriya.

== See also ==
- List of towns in Central Province, Sri Lanka
