= Embuldeniya =

Embuldeniya is a surname. Notable people with the surname include:

- Chandra Embuldeniya, Sri Lankan academic
- Lasith Embuldeniya (born 1996), Sri Lankan cricketer
