= Wewatenna =

- Village
- Interactive map of Wewatenna
- Coordinates: 7.1021°N 81.0544°E
- Country: Sri Lanka
- Province: Central Province
- Time zone: UTC+5:30 (Sri Lanka Standard Time)

Wewatenna is a village in Sri Lanka. It is located within Central Province.

== See also ==
- List of settlements in Central Province (Sri Lanka)
