= Boyagoda =

Boyagoda is a surname. Notable people with the surname include:

- Hasitha Boyagoda (born 1998), Sri Lankan cricketer
- Randy Boyagoda (born 1976), Canadian writer
