= Bopitiya =

- Village
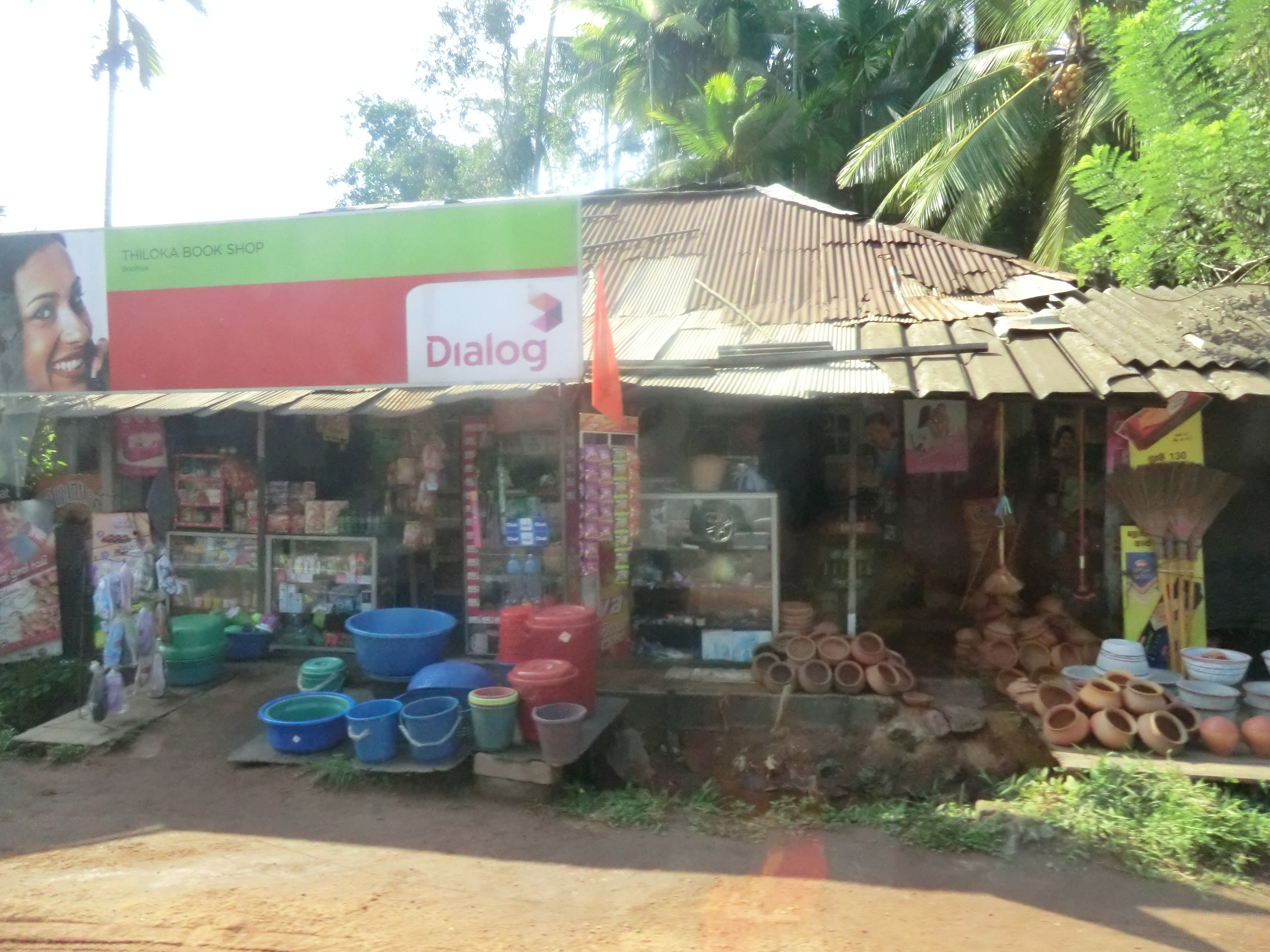

- Location within Sri Lanka
- Coordinates: 7.0767°N 79.8585°E
- Country: Sri Lanka
- Province: Western Province
- Time zone: UTC+5:30 (Sri Lanka Standard Time)

Bopitiya is a village in Western Province, Sri Lanka. It lies on the western coast of Sri Lanka. It contains St Nicholas Church and St Jude's Church, Loyola College and a beach. Loyola College started initially in St Nicholas Church in 2003.

== See also ==
- List of towns in Western Province, Sri Lanka
