= Ettampitiya =

Place in Uva Province, Sri Lanka

Ettampitiya ඇටම්පිටිය Atampitiya
- Location within Sri Lanka
- Coordinates: 6°56′19.32″N 80°59′18.13″E
- Country: Sri Lanka
- Province: Uva Province
- District: Badulla
- Elevation: 1,141 m (3,743 ft)
- Time zone: UTC+5:30 (Sri Lanka Standard Time Zone)
- Postal code: 90140

Ettampitiya (Sinhala: ඇටම්පිටිය) is a small town in Sri Lanka. It is located in the Badulla District, Uva Province. It is located 16 km (10 mi) south-west of Badulla, at the junction of the A5 highway (Peradeniya-Badulla-Chenkalady highway) and B43 road.

== Religion ==
- Ettampitiya Sri Neegrodarama Temple

== Education ==
- Ettampitiya Central College
- Ettampitiya Hindu College
- Ettampitiya National School

== Attractions ==
- Gerandi Ella Falls
- Kotugodella fort (ruins)

== See also ==
- Towns in Uva
