= Opatha =

Opatha is a surname. Notable people with the surname include:

- Rashmika Opatha (born 1997), Sri Lankan cricketer
- Tony Opatha (1947–2020), Sri Lankan cricketer
