= Hingurukaduwa =

Coordinates: 6°49′N 81°09′E

- Village
- Interactive map of Hingurukaduwa
- Country: Sri Lanka
- Province: Uva Province
- Time zone: UTC+5:30 (Sri Lanka Standard Time)
- Postal code: 90508

Hingurukaduwa is a village in Sri Lanka. It is located within Uva Province.
