= Bambaragama =

- Village
- Interactive map of Bambaragama
- Coordinates: 7.1389°N 80.7372°E
- Country: Sri Lanka
- Province: Central Province
- Time zone: UTC+5:30 (Sri Lanka Standard Time)

Bambaragama is a village in Sri Lanka. It is located within Central Province.

== See also ==
- List of towns in Central Province, Sri Lanka
