= Wadumulla =

- Country: Sri Lanka
- Province: Western Province
- Time zone: UTC+5:30 (Sri Lanka Standard Time)

Wadumulla is a small town in Sri Lanka. It is located within Western Province.

== See also ==
- Dewalapola
- List of towns in Southern Province, Sri Lanka
