= Galahitiyawa =

Galahitiyawa ගලහිටියාව கலஹித்தியாவா
- Village
- Location within Sri Lanka
- Country: Sri Lanka
- Province: North Western Province
- Time zone: UTC+5:30 (Sri Lanka Standard Time)

Galahitiyawa (Sinhala: ගලහිටියාව, Tamil: கலஹித்தியாவா) is a village in Sri Lanka. It is located within North Western Province.

== See also ==
- List of towns in North Western Province, Sri Lanka
