= Kandegedara =

- Village
- Country: Sri Lanka
- Province: Uva Province
- Time zone: UTC+5:30 (Sri Lanka Standard Time)

Kandegedara is a village in Sri Lanka. It is located within Central Province.
