= Ambagaspitiya =

Coordinates: 7°05′N 80°04′E

- Village
- Interactive map of Ambagaspitiya
- Country: Sri Lanka
- Province: Central Province
- Time zone: UTC+5:30 (Sri Lanka Standard Time)

Ambagaspitiya is a village in Sri Lanka. It is located within Western Province, Sri Lanka.

== See also ==
- List of towns in Central Province, Sri Lanka
