= Udagama =

Udagama උඩගම உதகம
- Village
- Map of Sri Lanka showing the location of Udagama.
- Coordinates: 6.468603°N 80.016932°E
- Country: Sri Lanka
- Province: Western Province
- District: Colombo District
- Time zone: UTC+5:30 (Sri Lanka Standard Time Zone)

Udagama (Sinhala: උඩගම, Tamil: உதகம) is a village in the Divisional Secretary's Division of Padukka, Western Province, Sri Lanka. The village is so named because it is the highest point in the Colombo District, reaching heights of 493 metres (1,617 ft) at Udagama Kanda point.
