= Dambagalla =

- Village
- Location within Sri Lanka
- Coordinates: 6°57′01″N 81°22′05″E
- Country: Sri Lanka
- Province: Uva
- District: Monaragala
- Elevation: 318 m (1,043 ft)
- Time zone: UTC+5:30 (Sri Lanka Standard Time Zone)
  - Summer (DST): UTC+6 (Summer time)
- Postal code: 91050

Dambagalla is a village and former Union Council in Monaragala District, Uva Province, southeastern-central Sri Lanka. It lies 8.2 kilometres (5.1 mi) by road to the north of Monaragala, off the Colombo-Batticaloa highway (A4).

== History ==
A tea plantation was established at Dambagalla in 1912. It was operated by English and Scottish Co-operative Wholesales Societies from 1912 to 1917. In September 2014 the residence of Janatha Vimukthi Peramuna (JVP) candidate for Uva, Anura Kumara Wickremesing, was attacked by an unidentified group in the Obbeygoda area of Dambagalla. In April 2020, a 25-year-old wildlife officer was fatally shot by poachers in Gal Oya National Park in Dambagalla.

== Landmarks ==
There is a branch of the Bank of Ceylon in Makulla Town, Dambagalla. The Sri Wijayawardhanaaramaya, Bingoda Purana Viharaya and Sri Vivekarmaya Buddhist temples are in the vicinity as well as Madulla Public Library. Dambagalla tank stores water for irrigation in the area.
