= Alugolla =

Village in Sri Lanka

- Village
- Location within Sri Lanka
- Coordinates: 7°08′57″N 80°32′04″E
- Country: Sri Lanka
- Province: Central Province
- District: Kandy District
- Divisional secretariat: Ganga Ihala Korale Divisional Secretariat
- Time zone: UTC+5:30 (Sri Lanka Standard Time)

Alugolla is a village in Sri Lanka. It is located northwest of Menikdiwela, within Kandy District, Central Province.

== Demographics ==
Historical population
Year	Pop.	±%
1881	54	—
1891	40	−25.9%

== See also ==
- List of towns in Central Province, Sri Lanka
