= List of Archaeological Protected Monuments in Monaragala District =

This is a list of Archaeological Protected Monuments in Monaragala District, Sri Lanka.

Monument	Image	Location	Grama Niladhari Division	Divisional Secretary's Division	Registered	Description	Refs
Ahungoda Purana Vihara		Nannapurawa		Medagama	22 November 2002	Three drip ledged caves	
Aluthapola fort		Aluthapola		Badalkumbura	8 July 2005		
Aluthwela Vihara		Konketiya		Buttala	22 November 2002	Stupa	
Ambagolla Thislen Vihara		Kahambana	No. 125-Kahambana	Monaragala	6 June 2008	The drip ledged cave complex with inscriptions	
Ampitigoda Purana Vihara		Hingurukaduwa		Badalkumbura	22 November 2002	Stupa and Bodhighara	
Andanpahuwa Aranya Senasana			Dickyaya	Buttala	6 June 2008	Drip-ledged caves	
Andawelayaya ruins			Andawelayaya	Wellawaya	17 May 2013	Building ruins	
Anjalee Vihara			No. 151-D, Anjaligama	Wellawaya	6 June 2008	Dagoba, building ruins with stone remains and pathway wall	
Bambaragala, Nikiniyagoda caves			No. 28E, Indhigas Ella	Siyambalanduwa	22 July 2011	Drip-ledged rock caves	
Bibilemulla Raja Maha Vihara			Bibilemulla	Medagama	23 January 2009	Discourse Room and Buddha Bhikkus Disciplinary Hall	
Bibile Walawwa		Walawwatta	Bibile	Bibile	23 January 2009		
Bidunkada Ruins				Buttala		The ruins of a 30 foot high Dagoba and the remains of a building with rock pillars	
Bingoda Purana Vihara			No. 117-Dambagalla	Madulla	6 June 2008	The two drip ledged rock caves and a rock inscription	
Bingoda Purana Vihara			Kehellanda	Madulla	17 May 2013	The two drip-ledge rock caves with stone inscriptions located in the territory	
Bokagonna Purana Devalaya		Bokagonna		Bibile	22 November 2002		
Buddama Purana Vihara		Buddama		Siyambalanduwa	22 November 2002	Drip-ledged caves	
Budugalge Purana Vihara		Horombuwa	No. 131	Monaragala	6 June 2008	Drip-ledged caves with inscriptions, Buddhist shrine, flight of steps, site of ruins with stone pillars	
Budugallena Aranya Senasana			Konkatiya	Buttala	6 June 2008	The drip ledged rock caves, flight of steps	
Buduruvagala				Wellawaya		Seven statues sculptured on relief of the rock during the 9th -10th c A.D.	
Bullena Aranya Senasana		Ambadandaragama		Buttala	23 January 2009	The two drip ledged rock caves	
Dambegoda Bodhisatva Statue		Okkampitiya		Buttala		The Avalokiteshvara Bodhisatva Image	
Dambeara Wewa ruins		Diggalayaya	No. 150-1, Siripuragama	Wellawaya	25 March 2016	Buddha's statue (half built) and places of ruins of buildings with stone pillars at the foot of Dambeara Lake	
Deliwa Tapovanarama Vihara		Deliwa		Madulla	22 November 2002	Drip ledged caves	
Deliwa Thera Puththabhaya Arama		Deliwa	Namal Oya Colony	Madulla	23 January 2009	The two drip ledged rock caves, rock inscriptions and pond	
Dematamal Viharaya		Okkampitiya		Buttala	27 December 1974	The Stupa, Stone pillars and other building ruins	
Devagiri Aranya Senasana		Mahagodayaya		Buttala	22 November 2002	Stupa and five drip-ledged caves	
Devagiri Aranya Senasana		Helagama	Mahagodayaya	Buttala	25 March 2016	Other archaeological evidences including cave complex, ruins of buildings and Chaitya within the premises	
Devagiri Vihara		Thabana		Medagama	22 November 2002	Buddhist shrine	
Diggalayaya Wewa ruins		Diggalayaya	No. 150-1, Siripuragama	Wellawaya	25 March 2016	Place of ruins with the hillock of Chaitya in the land adjoining Diggalayaya lake	
Ethiliwewa Wewa			Ethiliwewa	Wellawaya	25 March 2016	Sluice	
Galabedda Sri Pana Vihara		Kimbulawala		Siyambalanduwa	22 November 2002	Cave temple	
Gal Oya Amuna		Badulla Gammana		Bibile	22 November 2002		
Gammana Purana Vihara		Badulla Gammana		Bibile	22 November 2002		
Gangathilaka Vihara		Kurudana	Uvakuda Oya	Wellawaya	23 January 2009	The Kurudana Gangathilaka Vihara, dagoba and antiques situated close to Kirindi Oya	
Ganulpotha Purana Vihara			No. 127-Kolonwinna	Monaragala	6 June 2008	The cave vihare, drip-ledged caves, cave with Brahmi lettering, dagoba, row of steps, watapatha flower plant, stone slabs with royal figure and lamp holes	
Gonsarudawa archaeological reserve			No. 228-A, Dombagahawela	Siyambalanduwa	6 June 2008	Drip-ledged caves with inscriptions, building ruins with stone pillars and ponds	
Gothameegama ruins			Gothameegama	Katharagama	25 March 2016	Drip Ledged cave	
Hamanawa Purana vihara		Bulupitiya	Bulupitiya	Bibile	23 January 2009	Vihara ruins and dagoba	
Hathporuwa Vihara		Medagama		Buttala	22 November 2002	Tempita Vihara	
Hebessa ruins		Hebessa		Buttala		Image house with a 32-foot Buddha image. This vihara is believed to be the Naka Maha Vihara mentioned in the great chronicle Mahavamsa	
Hebessa ruins		Hebessa	Dambeyaya	Buttala	25 March 2016	Drip-ledged caves, flight of steps and marks of quarries nearby rock plane at Hebessa North	
Kadala Veherawatte ruins		Ritigahawatta		Madulla	22 November 2002	Stupa and image house	
Kamhathadhmulla Purana Vihara			Bendhiyawa	Bibile	23 January 2009	Dagoba and ruins of buildings	
Kanabisopokuna Raja Maha Vihara		Handapanagala		Wellawaya	22 November 2002	Stupa and drip-ledged cave	
Kanavegalla Stone Inscription		Kanavegalla		Bibile	22 November 2002	Inscription at Maligatenna	
Kandasurindugama cave temple		Kandasurindugama	Katharagama	Katharagama	12 June 2015	Drip-ledged cave and two natural caves at the premises	
Karandugala ruins			No. 103/B, Karandugala	Bibile	23 January 2009	Ruins containing evidence of antiques situated at Karandugala or Yahampahana	
Kataragama temple		Kataragama	Kataragama	Katharagama	8 April 2009	The Kataragama Ruhuna maha Kataragam Devale Premises and its buildings and other Archaeological remains situated in the limits	
Katugahagalge Purana Len Vihara		Muthukeliyawa		Buttala	22 November 2002	Cave temple with inscription at the premises	
Kawudawa Purana Vihara			Kawudawa	Monaragala	6 June 2008	Buddhist shrine	
Keheliya Raja Maha Vihara		Veherayaya		Wellawaya	22 November 2002	Stupa	
Kithulkotte Henyaya archaeological reserve			No. 150-D	Wellawaya	6 June 2008	The ruined dagoba and buildings	
Kokunnewa Vihara		Kokunnewa		Bibile	23 January 2009	The Tempita Vihara	
Konketiya Purana Vihara		Konketiya		Buttala	22 November 2002	Stupa	
Kosmandiya Aranya Senasana		Medagama		Buttala	22 November 2002	Four drip ledged caves	
Kotabowa Kuda Kataragama Devala			No. 101-B-Mellagama	Medagama	8 April 2009	Devale Premises and its buildings and other archaeological remains situated in the limits	
Kotasara Piyangala Raja Maha Vihara		Mallahewa	No. 102-B-Mallahewa	Bibile	6 June 2008	Tampita vihare and Bhikku dwelling	
Kotasara Piyangala Raja Maha Vihara		Mallahewa	No. 102-B-Mallahewa	Bibile	23 January 2009	Residence of the Buddha Bhikkus, well, Tempita vihare, dagoba and building ruins	
Kotawehera Ruins		Alutwewa		Wellawaya		A small Dagoba and around it the remains of a retaining wall	
Kotiyagala Len Vihara		Mayilla		Wellawaya		Cave temple with a reclining Buddha image and paintings	
Kotiyagoda Purana Vihara		Kotiyagoda		Siyambalanduwa	23 January 2009	The drip ledged rock caves	
Lollehela Mount ruins		Lollehela		Siyambalanduwa	23 January 2009	The drip ledged rock caves situated at the base of Lollehela Mount	
Mahatissa Len Senasuna		Newolkele		Wellawaya	22 November 2002	Four drip ladged caves	
Maligawila				Buttala		Ruins of an Image House and a Monastic Complex	
Manabharana Raja Maha Vihara			Manabharana	Siyambalanduwa	6 June 2008	The land with ruined dagoba and other ruins	
Mandagala Vihara			Kivulayaya	Siyambalanduwa	6 June 2008	The drip ledged cave	
Mayuragiri Purana Vihara			No. 130-B, Weliyaya	Monaragala	6 June 2008	All the drip ledged rock caves with inscriptions, ruined buildings with stone pillars and foundation	
Meeyagala Purana Vihara			No. 120-A, Meeyagala	Siyambalanduwa	6 June 2008	Mound	
Mulagiri Aranya Senasana		Habarugala		Sevanagala	6 February 2009	Ruins of mounds of dagoba, belonging to Mulagiri Aranya Senasana premises portion of the boundary walls rock engravings, and steps engraved on stone in the village	
Mulgiri Purana Vihara		Mullegama	No. 104 - Mullegama	Madulla	23 January 2009	The ruins of the dagoba and other antiques	
Muppane Raja Maha Vihara ( (Viharmulla Temple)			No. 129-F-Vihara Mulla	Monaragala	6 June 2008	The Buddha shrine with paintings, sculpture and carvings of the Kandyan period, ruins site with buildings with stone pillar	
Nagala Raja Maha Vihara			No. 101-B-Nagala	Bibile	6 June 2008	Tam inscriptions, inscriptions, stone pillars, rock with Korawakgal and chatragal, Bhikku dwelling with the compound in the centre	
Nagala Raja Maha Vihara			No. 101/E - Morattamulla	Bibile	23 January 2009	Two rock inscriptions and residence of Bhikkus	
Namaluwa archaeological site		Namaluwa	Mahakalugolla	Siyambalanduwa	12 June 2015	All caves with drip-ledges and stone inscriptions, rock inscriptions, Stupa and ruins of buildings	
Nayagala Aranya Senasana		Karavilakanatte	Medagama	Buttala	6 June 2008	The four drip ledged caves, ponds, stone water spout and Stupa mound	
Neelagiri Purana Vihara		Medapitiya		Bibile	22 November 2002	Drip ledged cave	
Neluwagala Kanda Purana Vihara		Pubudu wewa		Wellawaya	22 November 2002	Stupa	
Neluwagala Kanda Vihara		Gonaganara		Buttala	22 November 2002	Stupa	
Nikevehera Vihara		Hambegamuwa		Thanamalvila	22 November 2002	Stupa	
Nilgala Bulupitiya hela ruins		Bulupitiya	Bulupitiya	Bibile	6 February 2009	Dagoba situated at the place called and known as Bulupitiya hela in the Nilgala Protected land	
Nilgala Bulupitiya ruins		Bulupitiya	Bulupitiya	Bibile	6 February 2009	Stupa, the building known as the Buddhist image house, and other ruined buildings, two drip-ledged rock caves with inscriptions, rock inscriptions near Hatpottawewa, boundary wall, stupa and ruined buildings, bearing archaeological evidence with the rock cave in the place called Mahawela, drip ledges rock cave in the place called Yakuheve hela, a complex of drip-ledged caves with inscriptions in the place called Galkotte, ruined buildings in the place called Weheragoda watta surrounded by parapet wall in the Andagala Maligathenna, ruined buildings in the place called Andagala in place where there are ruined buildings, rock plain bearing archaeological evidence	
Oorusitawewa ruins		Mahagama		Sevanagala	6 February 2009	Ruins (biso Kotuwa) of the Oorusitawewa	
Pansalwaththa-Usgala ruins			Dambeyaya	Buttala	12 June 2015	Drip ledged cave at the place	
Pashchimarama Vihara		Hambegamuwa		Thanamalvila	22 November 2002		
Pilimahela ruins				Thanamalvila	22 November 2002	Stupa and image house	
Poyamalu Vihara		Medagama		Buttala	22 November 2002	Stupa	
Pudamayaya ruins		Pudamayaya	Gaminipura	Buttala	25 March 2016	Place with remains of stone tools belonging to pre-historic era; Quarries	
Pulinathalarama Vihara		Kotavehera		Thanamalvila	22 November 2002	Stupa and Tempita Vihara	
Rahathan Kanda Aranya Senasana		Buttala		Buttala	22 November 2002	Stupa and drip-ledged caves	
Rahathankanda Aranya Senasana			Wellassagama	Buttala	25 March 2016	All caves with drip ledges and stone inscriptions and Chaitya within the premises	
Rahatunkanda Buddharakkhitha Aranya Senasana		Mahagodayaya	Mahagodayaya	Buttala	25 March 2016	Drip ledged caves within the premises	
Rakhithakanda Purana Vihara		Kurugama		Wellawaya	22 November 2002	Drip-ledged cave temple with stupa	
Rathmalvehera Purana Vihara		Kottakambok		Wellawaya	22 November 2002	Stupa	
Selamali chaithya		Kotaveheragala		Wellawaya		The ruins of a 30 foot high Dagoba and the remains of a building with rock pillars	
Sellaba Purana Raja Maha Vihara		Veherayayagama		Wellawaya	22 November 2002	Image house and the Bodhighara	
Sella Kataragama Purana Gallen Vihara			No. 146-A-Sella Kataragama	Katharagama	6 June 2008	The drip ledged rock cave and chaitiya mound	
Sitakanda Aranya Senasana		Kumarawatta		Monaragala	23 January 2009	The rock inscriptions, and drip ledged rock caves and ruins of buildings	
Sri Vehera Pudama Vihara		Yakkhadurawa		Siyambalanduwa	22 November 2002	Drip ledged caves	
Telulla Ruins				Wellawaya		The remains of Dagoba and the ruins of a building with some pillars	
Thimbiriya Raja Maha Vihara			No. 101-B-Mellagama	Medagama	6 June 2008	Buddhist shrine with paintings and sculptures, Dhamma discourse hall, building ruins with stone pillars	
Thimbiriya Raja Maha Vihara		Thimbiriyagama	Mellagama	Medagama	23 January 2009	Buddhist shrine, Discourse Room and ruined buildings	
Thunkemgala Raja Maha Vihara		Thunkemgala		Sevanagala	12 June 2015	Hillocks of ruins, ponds and places with chisel holing on the rock at the premises	
Thunkemhela ruins		Anapallegama	No. 151-D	Wellawaya	6 June 2008	The archaeological reserve spread with ruin mounds, natural spouts, chisel marks, stone pillar base, lake with bund	
Unawatuna Raja Maha Vihara		Unawatuna		Buttala	12 June 2015	Dagoba, places with ruins of buildings and wall at the premises	
Vehera godella ruins			No. 151/G, Neluwagala	Wellawaya	8 July 2005	Building ruins	
Veherayaya ruins		Udaarawa		Buttala	22 November 2002	Stupa ruins	
Vettambugala ruins		Vettambugala	Kiuleyaya	Siyambalanduwa	30 December 2011	All caves with drip-ledges, cave inscriptions, paintings and plight of steps and rock inscriptions found at the place	
Vidimaga Purana Vihara			Siripuragama	Wellawaya	23 February 2007	Dagoba and image house	
Viharamulla Galketiya (Suddigewaththa) ruins			Waththegama	Siyambalanduwa	12 June 2015	Rock plane with marks of drains and symbols in the area	
Walagamba Raja Maha Vihara		Baguruwela		Buttala	22 November 2002	Stupa	
Walagamba Raja Maha Vihara		Gonaganara	Gonaganara	Buttala	12 June 2015	Stupa and the place of ruins of buildings at the premises	
Warunagama ruins		Warunagama-Weerasekaragama		Wellawaya	8 July 2005	Ruins at Weerasekaragama	
Wattarama Forest Hermitage		Wattarama		Siyambalanduwa	22 November 2002	Stupa, image house, caves with inscriptions and Bodhighara	
Wattegama Miyangodapitiya ruins			Waththegama Viharamulla	Siyambalanduwa	12 June 2015	Place with the ruins of Buddhist Arama, including ruins of buildings, parts of wall and ponds in the area	
Wattegama Purana Vihara		Kotiyagala		Siyambalanduwa		Ruins of a dilapidated Dagoba, stone pillars and a stone flight of steps	
Weheradivulana archaeological site				Monaragala	25 March 2016	Stupas, ruins of buildings, drip ledged caves and places with remains of stone tools in Pre-historic era situated within the Yala National Park	
Weheragala Purana Vihara			No. 127-Weheragala	Monaragala	6 June 2008	Dagoba, seat for flower trough, and flight of steps all on rock	
Weheragoda Purana Vihara			No. 139-Athala	Badalkumbura	6 June 2008	Buddhist shrine with frescoes	
Weligam Vehara Purana Vihara		Sudupanawela		Wellawaya	22 November 2002	Stupa	
Weligam Vehera Purana Vihara		Weliara	Kotikambokka	Wellawaya	12 June 2015	Places with Chaitya and ruins of buildings at the premises	
Wilehigoda Raja Maha Vihara		Pitakumburagama	No. 101/A - Pitakumbura	Bibile	23 January 2009	The sacred area containing Buddhist shrine, and residence of the Bhikkus	
Yatiyallathota Arachaeological reserve			No. 142-Yatiyallathota	Buttala	6 June 2008	The Padanagaraya, Tampitta building, monastery building, the round pathway on rock stone and building ruins	
Yudaganawa Vihara		Yudaganawa		Buttala	18 November 1957	The Stupa	
