= Therela Grama Niladhari Division =

Therela
- Grama Niladhari Division
- Interactive map of Therela
- Coordinates: 6.945429°N 81.344984°E
- Country: Sri Lanka
- Province: Uva Province
- District: Moneragala District
- Divisional Secretariat: Madulla Divisional Secretariat
- Electoral District: Moneragala Electoral District
- Polling Division: Bibile Polling Division

Area
  - Total: 4.92 km^{2} (1.90 sq mi)
- Elevation: 27 m (89 ft)

Population (2012)
  - Total: 804
  - Density: 163/km^{2} (420/sq mi)
- ISO 3166 code: LK-8206180

Therela

Therela Grama Niladhari Division is a Grama Niladhari Division of the Madulla Divisional Secretariat of Moneragala District of Uva Province, Sri Lanka. It has Grama Niladhari Division Code 113D.

Therela is a surrounded by the Dambagalla, Ellekona, Obbegoda, Iluklanda, Pagura and Galbokka Grama Niladhari Divisions.

== Demographics ==
=== Ethnicity ===
The Therela Grama Niladhari Division has a Sinhalese majority (99.4%). In comparison, the Madulla Divisional Secretariat (which contains the Therela Grama Niladhari Division) has a Sinhalese majority (99.9%)

Ethnicity in Therela
1. Sinhalese (99.4%)
2. Other (0.60%)

=== Religion ===
The Therela Grama Niladhari Division has a Buddhist majority (99.5%). In comparison, the Madulla Divisional Secretariat (which contains the Therela Grama Niladhari Division) has a Buddhist majority (99.4%)

Religion in Therela
1. Buddhist (99.5%)
2. Other (0.50%)
