= Meegahayaya Grama Niladhari Division =

Meegahayaya
- Grama Niladhari Division
- Interactive map of Meegahayaya
- Coordinates: 6.840997°N 81.233068°E
- Country: Sri Lanka
- Province: Uva Province
- District: Moneragala District
- Divisional Secretariat: Badalkumbura Divisional Secretariat
- Electoral District: Moneragala Electoral District
- Polling Division: Monaragala Polling Division

Area
  - Total: 8.78 km^{2} (3.39 sq mi)
- Elevation: 213 m (699 ft)

Population (2012)
  - Total: 486
  - Density: 55/km^{2} (140/sq mi)
- ISO 3166 code: LK-8218170

Meegahayaya

Meegahayaya Grama Niladhari Division is a Grama Niladhari Division of the Badalkumbura Divisional Secretariat of Moneragala District of Uva Province, Sri Lanka. It has Grama Niladhari Division Code 139D.

Meegahayaya is a surrounded by the Madugasmulla, Bogahapelessa, Athala, Kalagahakivula, Katugahagalge, Muthukeliyawa, Lunugala Colony and Naranwatta Grama Niladhari Divisions.

== Demographics ==
=== Ethnicity ===
The Meegahayaya Grama Niladhari Division has a Sinhalese majority (98.8%). In comparison, the Badalkumbura Divisional Secretariat (which contains the Meegahayaya Grama Niladhari Division) has a Sinhalese majority (85.7%)

Ethnicity in Meegahayaya
1. Sinhalese (98.8%)
2. Sri Lankan Tamil (1.20%)
3. Other (0.00%)

=== Religion ===
The Meegahayaya Grama Niladhari Division has a Buddhist majority (98.6%). In comparison, the Badalkumbura Divisional Secretariat (which contains the Meegahayaya Grama Niladhari Division) has a Buddhist majority (85.6%)

Religion in Meegahayaya
1. Buddhist (98.6%)
2. Hindu (1.20%)
3. Other (0.20%)
