= Maragala mountain range =

Mountain range in Sri Lanka

Maragala Mountain Range
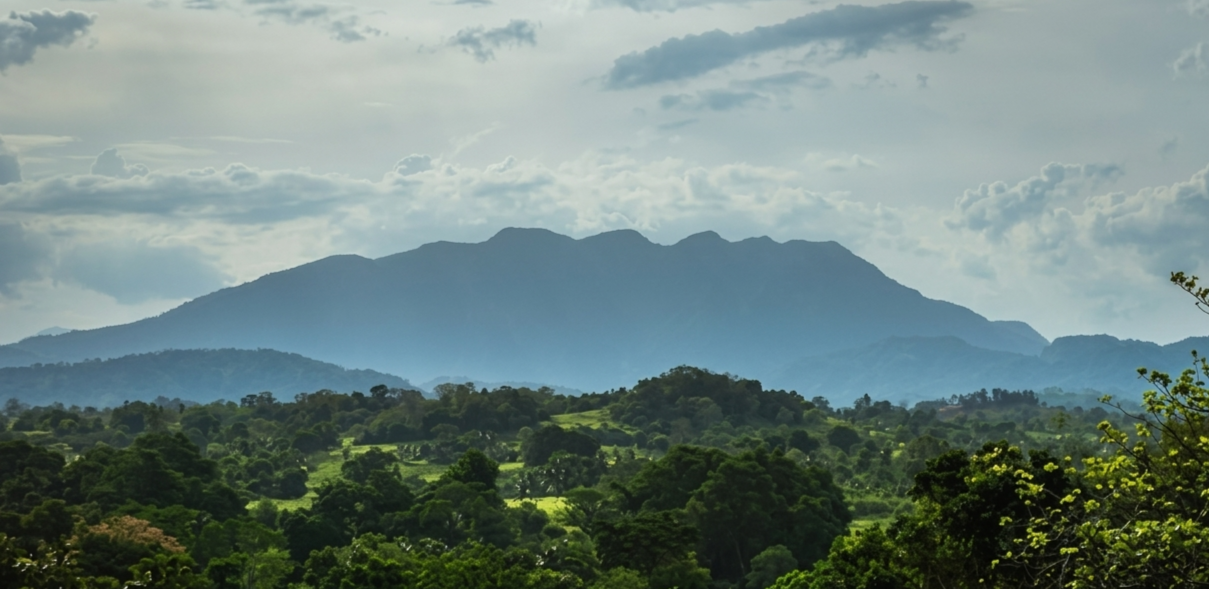

Highest point
- Elevation: 1,111 m (3,645 ft)
- Coordinates: 6.879803°N 81.382521°E

Dimensions
- Length: 10 km (6.2 mi)
- Area: 25 km^{2} (9.7 mi^{2})

Geography
- Location within Sri Lanka
- Location: Monaragala District, Uva Province, Sri Lanka

Geology
- Rock age: Precambrian (Over 500 million years)
- Mountain type: Erosional Residual Mountain

The Maragala Mountain Range, rising to an elevation of approximately 1,111 meters, is the highest mountain range in the Monaragala District, Sri Lanka. It also stands as the highest mountain range in southeastern and eastern Sri Lanka. The range is bordered by the Siyambalanduwa, Monaragala, and Madulla Divisional Secretariat divisions. Although the surrounding Monaragala District primarily exhibits intermediate dry zone characteristics, this mountain range features a wet, cool, and temperate climate, earning it the nickname 'The Little Nuwara Eliya of Monaragala'.
