= Army War College =

Army War College may refer to:

- United States Army War College, in Carlisle, Pennsylvania
- Army War College, Mhow, an institution of the Indian Army in Mhow, Madhya Pradesh
- Army War College (Sri Lanka), an institution of the Sri Lanka Army in Buttala, Uva Province
- Army War College (Japan), a former college for officers of the Imperial Japanese Army
- Army War College (Turkey)

== See also ==
- École de guerre - Terre, France
- War college
