= Medagama =

Medagama මැදගම Medagama Ath wasuma
- Village
- Location within Sri Lanka
- Coordinates: 7°2′7.972″N 81°16′32.341″E
- Country: Sri Lanka
- Province: Uva
- District: Monaragala

Government
  - Type: Pradeshiya Saba
  - Pradeshiya Sabapathi: Ranjith Piyadigama
- Time zone: UTC+5:30 (Sri Lanka Standard Time)
- Postal Code: 91550

Medagama (Sinhala: මැදගම) is a village, located within the Uva Province, Sri Lanka. It is situated in the middle of a mountain range, hence the origin of its name: 'Meda' means middle and 'Gama' is village.

== Geography ==
Medagama lies in the southeastern part of the island, approximately 20 kilometers northwest of Monaragala town. The area is characterized by rolling hills, paddy fields, and dry-zone forest, contributing to its largely agrarian lifestyle.

== Economy ==
The economy of Medagama is predominantly based on agriculture, with paddy cultivation, chena farming, and home gardening being the main sources of income for residents. Some residents are also employed in public services, small businesses, or engage in cottage industries.

== Demographics ==
The population of Medagama consists mainly of Sinhalese Buddhists, with a strong presence of traditional village culture. Community life often revolves around local temples and cultural events.

== Education ==
Medagama is home to several government schools that serve the educational needs of local children, including Medagama National School and a number of primary and secondary schools in surrounding villages.

== Religion and Culture ==
The town is predominantly Buddhist, with several Buddhist temples (viharayas) serving as religious and cultural centers. Annual religious festivals such as Vesak, Poson, and Esala Perahera are celebrated with community participation.

== Transport ==
Medagama is connected by local road networks and can be accessed by regional bus services. The nearest major town with administrative services and broader transportation links is Monaragala.

== Nature and Wildlife ==
Due to its proximity to forested areas, wildlife such as elephants, monkeys, and various bird species can occasionally be spotted near the village. Environmental conservation and human-wildlife conflict management are ongoing concerns in the region.
