= Buddama Raja Maha Vihara =

Cave temple in Monaragala, Sri Lanka

- බුද්දම රජ මහා විහාරය

Religion
- Affiliation: Buddhism
- District: Monaragala
- Province: Uva Province

Location
- Location: Buddama, Sri Lanka
- Interactive map of Buddama Raja Maha Vihara
- Coordinates: 07°02′28.4″N 81°29′20.4″E

Architecture
- Type: Buddhist Temple
- Style: Cave temple
- Completed: 3rd century BC

Buddama Raja Maha Vihara (Sinhalaː බුද්දම රජ මහා විහාරය) is a historic Cave temple in Buddama village, Monaragala district, Sri Lanka. Buddama is a rural village lying off Siyambalanduwa town and is known as one of the earliest settlements in the country. Currently the temple has been formally recognised by the Government as an archaeological site in Sri Lanka.

== History ==
According to the facts from great chronicle Mahawamsa and the inscriptions found in the Vihara premises, Buddama temple was built in the third century BC. It has also been recorded in Uva Viharawamsa, a chronicle about important Buddhist centers in the Uva province, which states that Buddama was worshipped by early Buddhists. Before the advent of Buddhism to the country during the Anuradhapura period, the temple is said to have been a vocational training center for local craft men before it became a Buddhist monastery.

The temple has received royal patronage by kings from time to time, as mentioned in the inscriptions found in Vihara premises and other outside references. According to the Vihara inscriptions, southern regional king Udaya I (883 – 896) donated villages to the temple during his reign and King Parakramabahu I (1153–1186) created administrative divisions centering the Buddama Temple. Renovations to the temple were carried out by Sri Wickrama Rajasingha (1747 – 1781) in Kandyan period.

== Murals ==
The temple is composed of more than 20 caves. The main rock cave of the temple is drip ledged and not very high. It houses many mural paintings and sculptures belonging to Kandyan style. The entrance is decorated with a Makara Thorana (Dragon's Arch) built of clay. Inside the main chamber, a reclining Buddha statue with several seated Buddha statues are visible. The main Buddha Statue is believed to have been constructed by King Rajadhi Rajasingha. The canopy of the cave is decorated with various floral designs with the walls depicting Buddhist Jathaka stories.

== Vihara inscriptions ==
=== Buddama cave inscription ===
Period: 3rd BC-1st centuries AD, Script: Early Brahmi, Language: Old Sinhala
Content: "This inscription records donation of a cave to Buddhist Sangha by a teacher named Gupta, the grandson of the village councilor Vasabha and the son of Sumana"
