= Moneragala Divisional Secretariat =

- Divisional Secretariat
- Interactive map of Moneragala Divisional Secretariat
- Country: Sri Lanka
- Province: Uva Province
- District: Moneragala District
- Time zone: UTC+5:30 (Sri Lanka Standard Time)

Moneragala Divisional Secretariat is a Divisional Secretariat of Moneragala District, of Uva Province, Sri Lanka.

== Demography ==
Religion in Moneragala DS Division (2012)
1. Buddhist (86.0%)
2. Hindu (12.0%)
3. Muslim (0.80%)
4. Roman Catholic (1.00%)
5. Other Christian (0.30%)
6. Other (0.00%)
