= Medagama Divisional Secretariat =

- Divisional Secretariat
- Interactive map of Medagama Divisional Secretariat
- Country: Sri Lanka
- Province: Uva Province
- District: Moneragala District
- Time zone: UTC+5:30 (Sri Lanka Standard Time)

Medagama Divisional Secretariat is a Divisional Secretariat of Moneragala District, of Uva Province, Sri Lanka.

== Demography ==
Religion in Medagama DS Division (2012)
1. Buddhist (85.9%)
2. Hindu (0.10%)
3. Muslim (13.8%)
4. Roman Catholic (0.10%)
5. Other Christian (0.10%)
6. Other (0.00%)
