= Chandima =

Chandima is both a given name and a surname. Notable people with the name include:

- Chandima Vijaya Bandara (born 1995), Sri Lankan cricketer
- Chandima Gamage, Sri Lankan politician
- Chandima Gomes, Sri Lankan engineer
- Chandima Gunaratne (born 1982), Sri Lankan cricketer
- Chandima Weerakkody (born 1968), Sri Lankan politician
- Bodagama Chandima (born 1957), Sri Lankan Buddhist monk
- Dilan Chandima (born 1990), Sri Lankan cricketer
- Sumeth Chandima (born 1989), Sri Lankan cricketer
