= Katharagama Divisional Secretariat =

- Divisional Secretariat
- Country: Sri Lanka
- Province: Uva Province
- District: Moneragala District
- Time zone: UTC+5:30 (Sri Lanka Standard Time)

Katharagama Divisional Secretariat is a Divisional Secretariat of Moneragala District, of Uva Province, Sri Lanka.

== Demography ==
Religion in Katharagama DS Division (2012)
1. Buddhist (95.2%)
2. Hindu (3.70%)
3. Muslim (0.30%)
4. Roman Catholic (0.40%)
5. Other Christian (0.50%)
6. Other (0.00%)
