= Wellawaya Divisional Secretariat =

- Divisional Secretariat
- Interactive map of Wellawaya Divisional Secretariat
- Country: Sri Lanka
- Province: Uva Province
- District: Moneragala District
- Time zone: UTC+5:30 (Sri Lanka Standard Time)

Wellawaya Divisional Secretariat is a Divisional Secretariat of Moneragala District, of Uva Province, Sri Lanka. The Division joined the Global Age Friendly Cities Network in December 2012.

== Demography ==
Religion in Wellawaya DS Division (2012)
1. Buddhist (96.9%)
2. Hindu (0.70%)
3. Muslim (1.80%)
4. Roman Catholic (0.30%)
5. Other Christian (0.30%)
6. Other (0.00%)
