= Monaragala Royal College =

- ඌව රාජකීය විද්‍යාලය
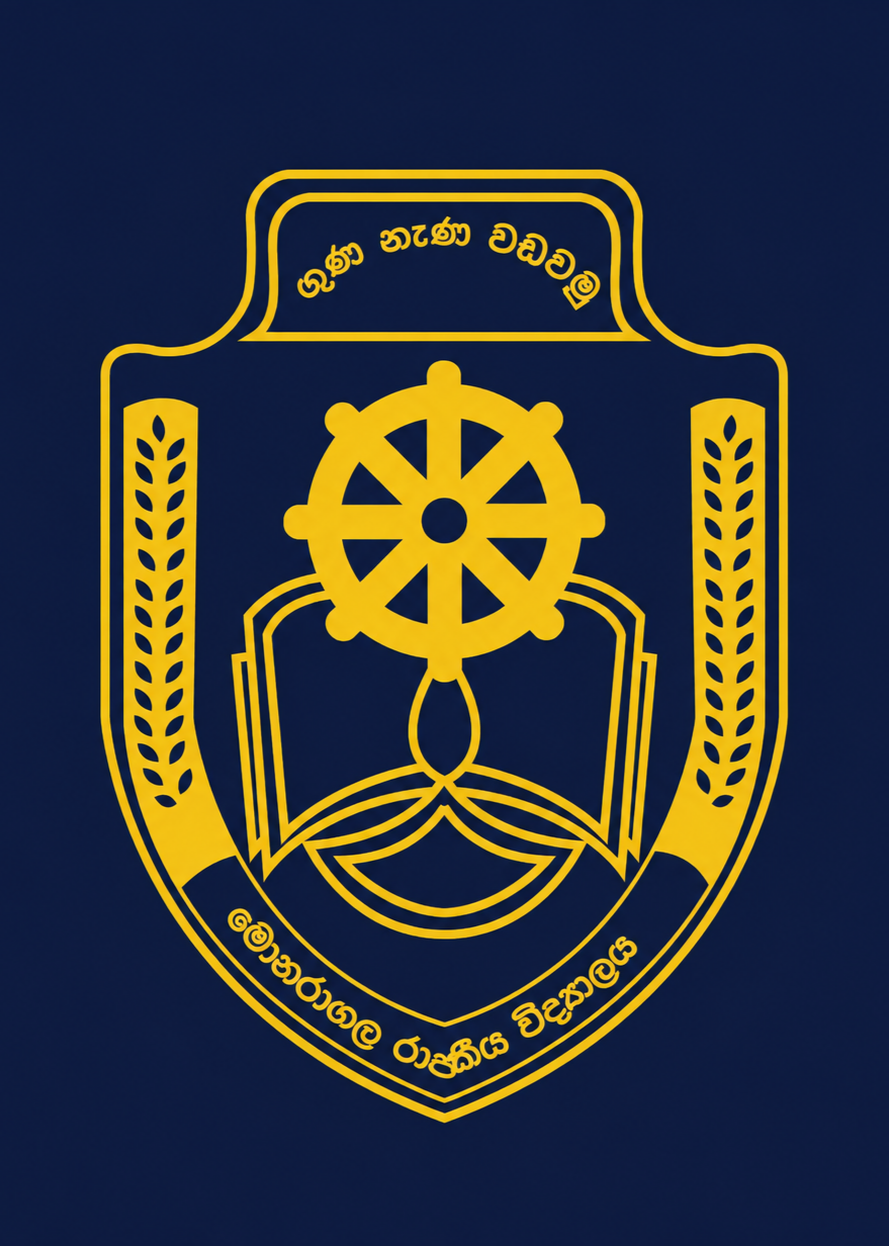

Location
- Monaragala, Monaragala District, Uva Province; Sri Lanka; 6°51′37″N 81°20′26″E

Information
- Type: Public national
- Motto: Let virtue and knowledge grow
- Religious affiliation: Buddhism
- Established: 15 March 1969; 57 years ago
- School district: Monaragala Education Zone
- Authority: Ministry of Education
- Principal: Chaminda Aththanayaka
- Teaching staff: 150+
- Grades: 1 to 13
- Gender: Boys and girls
- Age range: 6 to 19
- Enrollment: 3100+
- Language: English; Sinhala
- Colors: Navy Blue and Gold
- Song: ළහිරු වෙමින් පිබිදෙන අරැණේ...
- Alumni: Uva Royalists

Monaragala Royal College (Sinhala: රාජකීය විද්‍යාලය මොණරාගල; also known as Monaragala Rajakeeya Vidyalaya or Uva Royal college (Sinhala: ඌව රාජකීය විද්‍යාලය) is a national school in Monaragala, Sri Lanka. It was founded in 1969. As a national school controlled by the central government (as opposed to the Provincial Council), it provides primary and secondary education.

== History and culture ==
The school was established on 15 March 1969 under the name Hulandawa Nawa Kanitu Viduhala, beginning with a single building, three teachers, and a small group of students. The first principal was T. S. Ranathunga. Over the years, the school expanded in infrastructure and student population and was later renamed Monaragala Rajakeeya Vidyalaya. Following its continued development, the Ministry of Education upgraded it to a national school in 1990 (under the second phase of establishing national schools), officially recognizing it as Royal College Monaragala. Today, it is one of the leading schools in the Monaragala District in terms of student enrolment.

A distinctive cultural feature of the school is that it is the only school in Sri Lanka where female teachers wear white sarees as their standard attire. Following this tradition since its inception in 1969, it reflects the school's unique identity and has been upheld for decades.

The school anthem, "The Sun is Rising and the Dawn is Breaking" (Sinhala: "හිරු වෙමින් පිබිදෙන අරුණේ"), was written by Sri Lankan lyricist Rathna Sri Wijesinghe, with the melody composed by Lalitha Alahakoon. He composed this during his time as a teacher at Royal College (then known as Hulandawa Nawa Kanitu Viduhala). Wijesinghe also wrote the poem sequence "Wassanaya" during the same period, based on the Hulanda Oya that flows near the school.

== Houses ==
Students at the school are divided into four houses, named by four renowned Sri Lankan kings in the country's history. These houses are led by house captains. The houses compete to win the inter-house championship, and 'house colours' are awarded to the winners. The inter-house event is held once every four years. The four houses are:

- Thissa
- Gamunu
- Vijaya
- Parakum

== Sports ==
=== Cricket ===
The Battle of the Mayurens or Battle of the Wellassa brotherhood, an annual cricket encounter between Royal College and Mahanama College, Monaragala, has been played since 2008 .

== See also ==
- List of schools in Uva Province
