= Bibile Divisional Secretariat =

- Divisional Secretariat
- Interactive map of Bibile Divisional Secretariat
- Country: Sri Lanka
- Province: Uva Province
- District: Moneragala District
- Time zone: UTC+5:30 (Sri Lanka Standard Time)

Bibile Divisional Secretariat is a Divisional Secretariat of Moneragala District, of Uva Province, Sri Lanka.

== Demography ==
Religion in Bibile DS Division (2012)
1. Buddhist (94.8%)
2. Hindu (2.20%)
3. Muslim (2.50%)
4. Roman Catholic (0.30%)
5. Other Christian (0.20%)
6. Other (0.00%)
