= Sri Lanka Air Force Junior Command & Staff College =

SLAF Junior Command & Staff College
- Established: 1999
- Affiliations: KDU
- Commanding Officer: Gp Capt VRS Vidanapathirana
- Location: Trincomalee, Sri Lanka
- Website: http://www.kdu.ac.lk http://www.airforce.lk/jc&sc/index.php

Sri Lanka Air Force Junior Command & Staff College is the Sri Lanka Air Force academic establishment providing training and education primarily to the mid-career officers of SLAF as well as to limited number of officers from Sri Lanka Navy, Sri Lanka Army and officers of various Allied forces. It is located at SLAF China Bay in Trincomalee and administrated by the Sri Lanka Air Force Academy.

== Courses ==
- Junior Command and Staff Course (JC&SC) - Accredited to the General Sir John Kotelawala Defence University for the Post Graduate Diploma in Defence Management.
- Administrative and Performance Development Module for Base Commanders and Commanding Officers
- Orientation Programme for Officer selected for the Defence Services Command and Staff Course

== See also ==
- Naval and Maritime Academy
- Officer Career Development Centre
