= Madulla Divisional Secretariat =

- Divisional Secretariat
- Interactive map of Madulla Divisional Secretariat
- Country: Sri Lanka
- Province: Uva
- District: Moeragala

Area
  - Total: 708 km^{2} (273 sq mi)

Population (20 March 2012)
  - Total: 31,238
  - Density: 44.12/km^{2} (114.3/sq mi)
- Time zone: UTC+5:30 (Sri Lanka Standard Time)

Madulla Divisional Secretariat is a Divisional Secretariat in the Moneragala District, of Uva Province, Sri Lanka.

== Demography ==
Religion in Madulla DS Division (2012)
1. Buddhist (99.4%)
2. Hindu (0.10%)
3. Muslim (0.00%)
4. Roman Catholic (0.30%)
5. Other Christian (0.20%)
6. Other (0.00%)
