= Thanamalvila Divisional Secretariat =

- Divisional Secretariat
- Interactive map of Thanamalvila Divisional Secretariat
- Country: Sri Lanka
- Province: Uva Province
- District: Moneragala District
- Time zone: UTC+5:30 (Sri Lanka Standard Time)

Thanamalvila Divisional Secretariat (also spelled Thanamalwila) is a Divisional Secretariat of Moneragala District, of Uva Province, Sri Lanka.

== Demography ==
Religion in Thanamalvila DS Division (2012)
1. Buddhist (99.5%)
2. Hindu (0.10%)
3. Muslim (0.00%)
4. Roman Catholic (0.20%)
5. Other Christian (0.20%)
6. Other (0.00%)

== Notable people ==
- Bodagama Chandima (born 1957), Buddhist monk
