= Bodagama Chandima =

Sri Lankan Buddhist monk

Bodagama Chandima බෝදාගම චන්දිම 強帝瑪法師
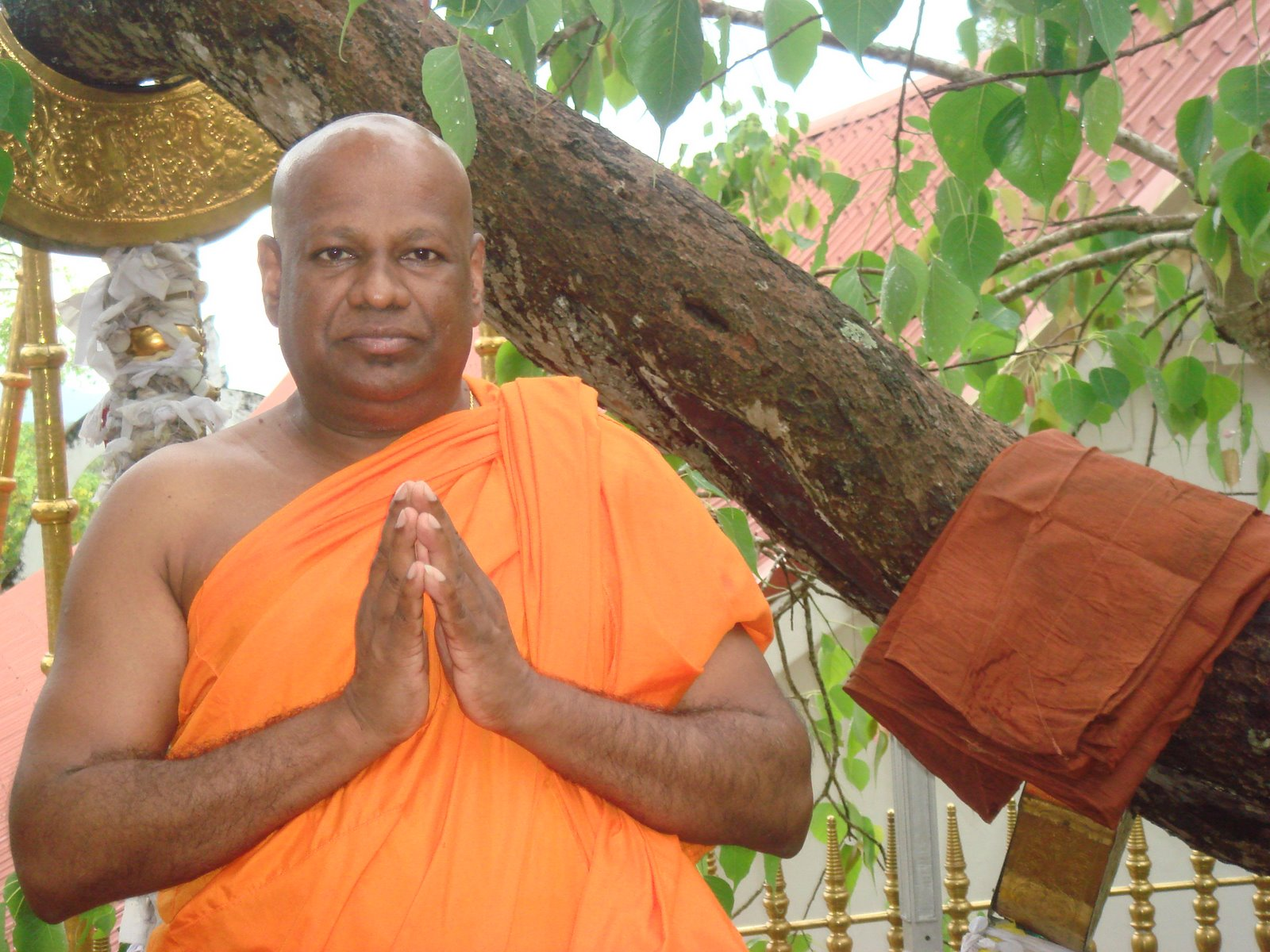
- Bodagama Chandima Bhikkhu
- Born: February 3, 1957 (age 69); Thanamalwila
- Occupations: Nāgānanda International Institute for Buddhist Studies, Vice-Chancellor Bhikkhu, teacher
- Website: bodagamachandima.lk// niibs.lk

Bodagama Chandima Thero (born 3 February 1957 in Thanamalwila, Sri Lanka) is a Buddhist monk. As of 2015 he taught Theravada Buddhism in Taiwan. With a group of Taiwanese Buddhists, he founded the Theravada Samadhi Education Association in Taipei.

As of 2014, he was the Chief Sangha Nayaka in Taiwan for Sri Lanka and also the Advisor of International Religious and Cultural Affairs to the President of Sri Lanka.

== Early life and education ==
Chandima was born in 1957 in Thanamalwila, a remote village of southern Sri Lanka. In 1970, at the age of thirteen, he was ordained as a novice monk (Pali "saamanera") by Dodampahala Sri Rathanajoti, the chief sangha nayaka of southern Sri Lanka and Atthudawe Gnanananda, the abbot of the Ratmalana Sri Vijayarama temple. In 1980, Chandima received higher ordination (Pali: bhikkhu upasampada) from the committee of Malwattha Sangha Community.

He attended the Mantinda Pirivena monastery in Matara to receive primary education and then moved to Subhararama Pirivena in Nugegoda for secondary education. In 1982, he began studying at the Buddhasravaka Bhiksu University in Anuradhapura. Here he obtained the Thripitakavedi Degree after completing the five-year programme that encompassed learning Pali, Sanskrit, English, Sinhala, Hindi, Buddhist Philosophy and Culture, Abhidharma, and Logic.

In 2003 Chandima was awarded an honorary Doctor of Philosophy degree by the University of Ruhuna, Sri Lanka for his work in propagating Theravada Buddhism internationally and spreading understanding of Buddhist philosophy. He is fluent in Pali, Sanskrit, Sinhala, English and Chinese.

== Mission ==
Starting as a novice monk¸ Chandima has studied, taught, practiced, and spread Buddhism.

He ordained more than one hundred Sri Lankan, Nepalese and Myanmar male and female novices, directed to different monasteries in Sri Lanka to train in Buddhist doctrines and discipline. From 2001 training programmes in meditation and monastery discipline have been held for young monks studying in higher education, including universities and teacher training institutes. From 1999 to 2001, Dhamma School textbooks to the value of sixteen million Sri Lankan Rupees were published and distributed for Sunday Dhamma Schools with the help of the Corporate Body of the Buddha Education Foundation in Taiwan. Chandima supports a number of international Buddhist organizations. In 2010 he attended the World Buddhist Council in Hong Kong, and became a director of the organization.

In 1999, he offered scholarships for medical students, school children and young monks in Sri Lanka. Scholarships were awarded to the monks coming from India, Nepal, and Bangladesh to study in Sri Lanka.

From 1999 medical groups from Taiwan and Malaysia went to Sri Lanka, especially to remote areas and to those torn by the civil war. Hundreds of millions of Sri Lankan Rupees were donated to sixty flood-devastated Buddhist temples in Galle, Matara, Hambantota and Badulla districts in 2003. Buddhist monks living in rural areas are offered financial and other requisites.

== Influences ==
In 1986, Ven Chandima visited the monastery of K. Sri Dhammananda, a propagandist of Theravada Buddhism. Dhammananda was carrying out work to spread the teachings of early Buddhism based on Malaysia.

== Service in Taiwan ==
In 1990, after working in Malaysia, Chandima received an invitation from the Taiwanese Chinese Buddhists to teach Theravada Buddhism in Taiwan. Whilst there, he entered the Fo-Guang San Buddhist Institute to study Chinese and Mahayana Buddhism, and later entered the National Taiwan Normal University in Taipei where he continued further study of Chinese.

After the completion of language studies in Taiwan, Chandima was invited to conduct meditation classes at the Corporate Body of Buddha Education Foundation. In addition to holding sermons and meditation classes, he began to translate Pali tripitaka texts into Chinese. He holds regular Dharma sermons and meditation classes. During the early years of career, meditation classes, Pali language classes, and Dhamma discussions were conducted on a daily basis. He also conducted English classes for children.

Initially, the Corporate Body of the Buddha Education Foundation focused on publishing Chinese Buddhist books. Later, with the help of Chandima, the Foundation extended its service to publish texts belong to Theravada tradition. The Buddhist texts which are used by Sri Lankan Buddhists as manuals were reprinted and distributed free over the whole country, including the Visuddhimagga (The Path of Purity) in Pali and Sinhala translation, Basic Buddhism Course, A Path to True Happiness, The Love of Life, Mind: Seal of the Buddhas, The Buddhist Liturgy, and The Buddha and His Teachings of Venerable Narada Mahathera, a Buddhist scholar and propagator of Theravada Buddhism. He also republished the works of Venerable Yakkaduwe Pragnarama Mahathera, a critical writer and the Ex-Head of the Vidyalankara Buddhist Institute.

In addition to the texts used in Sri Lanka, he republished a number of Buddhist texts of other Theravada Buddhist countries such as Thailand, Myanmar, Cambodia and Laos. In 2010, the Pali Dhammapada translated into Hindi by Hritikesh Sharan with many other Buddhist writings in six Indian languages were republished and distributed free in India.

== Republication of Tipitaka ==
In 2007, with the support of the Buddha Education Foundation in Taiwan, he could reprint the Therevada Pali Canon (tipitaka) with the Sinhalese translation, which was first published in 1956 in celebration of the 2,500 years of the Buddha's birthday (Sinhala: Buddha Jayanthi Samaruma). One set of the canon consists of 57 separate texts belong to sutta, vinaya and abhidhamma. After the reprint, the texts were distributed over thousand Buddhist education centers and higher education institutes in Sri Lanka and over hundred Buddhist temples in overseas. This task contributed to promote the faith in the Buddha's teaching and encourage reading and studying the original teachings of the Buddha among Sinhala Buddhists.

== Theravada Samadhi Education Association ==
Theravada Samadhi Education Association (Chinese:原始佛法三摩地學會) was established fundamentally with the purpose of promoting Theravada Buddhism. Functioning as a religious education centre, on a daily basis, meditation classes, dhamma discussions based on the Pali discourses, religious and other activities are conducted at the association's premises in Shipai, Taipei.

The Association invites Buddhist masters and foreign scholars to give dhamma talks. Lectures were given by Kirinde Dhammananda Maha thera, Professor Bellanwila Wimalarathana, the Chancellor of Sri Jayawardhenepura University in Sri Lanka, and Dr. Dodamgoda Rewatha, a popular Buddhist author and head of the Maha Bodhi Society in Kolkata, India.

Lay Buddhist scholar, Professor Sumanapala Galmangoda, the former Director of the Post Graduate Institute of Pali and Buddhist Studies, Colombo, Sri Lanka visited the venue and conducted a lecture on 2 April 2013. The London Pali Text Society Text Editor, former Head of the Department of Pali and Buddhist Studies of University of Peradeniya, Sri Lanka and the co-director of Dhammacayi Tipitaka Project in Thailand, Professor G.A. Somaratne visited the venue and conducted a public talk on 25 September 2013.

== Nāgānanda International Institute for Buddhist Studies ==
He was engaged in constructing the Nagananda International Buddhist University in Kelaniya, for study and research on Buddhism by Sri Lankan and international students. Though the education here will mainly focus on Theravada Buddhism, the necessary facilities to study Mahayana Buddhism, Vajrayana Buddhism and Chinese Buddhism will be provided.

One of the lecture halls was opened ceremonially by the President of Sri Lanka, Mahinda Rajapakse, in parallel to the celebration of the 2600 years of the Buddha Jayanthi.

== Children's charity ==
One of major services is the initiation of the Dharma Chakra Child Foundation situated in suburb of Colombo, Bandaragama. In 1993, the construction work was started and registered as a government recognized social organization in Sri Lanka. On 29 November 1998, President Chandrika Bandaranaike Kumaratunga attended the opening ceremony of the Foundation in Bandaragama. The Dharma Chakra Foundation functions as the central office of the foundation and its premise covers more than fourteen acres. At present, the foundation takes cares of two hundred male and female orphans whose majority comes from civil war affected North and East Sri Lanka. In addition to the services for children, a variety of educational, religious and social activities are conducted at the foundation.

To develop the pre-school education in rural areas in Sri Lanka, he has founded more than thirteen kindergartens throughout the country. Some of them are:

- Lianxin Ambalanthota Kindergarten, Ambalanthota
- Lianxin Bodagama Kindergarten, Bodagama
- Lianxin Lahiru Kindergarten, Suriara, Thanamalwila
- Lianxin Vijita Kindergarten, Thanamalwila
- Lianxin Bandaragama Kindergarten, Bandaragama
- Lianxin Pubudu Kindergarten, Suriara
- Lianxin Singiti Kusum Kindergarten, Suriara
- Lianxin Arabekema Kindergarten, Hambegamuwa
- Lianxin Angunakolapelassa Kindergarten, Angunakolapelassa
- Lianxin Mamawewa Kindergarten, Mamawewa
- Lianxin Samagi Kindergarten, Mamawewa

== Natural disaster relief efforts ==
After the 2004 Indian Ocean tsunami, Chandima aided in relief efforts. With the corporation of Taiwan Charity Organizations, medical camps, distribution of dry food and other necessary needs were conducted. Under his guidance, more than six hundred houses were built in tsunami hit areas such as Ambalantota, Bataatha, and Panama. The village in Ambalantota Uhapitigoda, Samadhigama (Chinese:台灣村), was constructed with a hospital complex, playground, computer centre, conference hall and helping centre. Up to date, the residents of the village are cared and provided with both material and spiritual facilities. In addition, he has constructed houses for the victims of civil war in Anuradhapura District.

With the catastrophic destruction brought to Myanmar by Cyclone Nargis on 2 May 2008, Chandima turned his attention to helping displaced people in Myanmar. First, he led several aid groups to meet the urgent needs of the victim of hurricane such as medical services, dry food, clothes, school equipments and other daily necessities. Certain monasteries torn down were financially supported to reconstruct and were given housebuilding materials. Then, he decided to build a village for those who lost their houses. The construction of the houses was initiated in 2008 and completed in 2009. The village has 1001 houses and a school for Children. It was named "Metta Village". The Sri Lankan president Mahinda Rajapaksa and the first lady Shiranti Rajapaksha with other Sri Lankan delegates participated in the ceremony held to hand over the houses for the residents.

== Official positions ==
The position of the Chief Sangha Nayaka in Taiwan was bestowed on Ven Chandima by the Supreme Sangha Council of the Malawatta Chapter. He is the Director of the Theravada Samadhi Education Association in Taiwan. Since 1999, works as an instructor to the Corporate Body of the Buddha Educational Foundation in Taiwan. And also he is the abbot of several renowned temples including the Manelwatta Temple in Kelaniya. Appointed adviser to the President of Sri Lanka on International Religious and Cultural Affairs in 2007.

== Honorary titles ==
- 2001 – The honorary title of Pariyatti Vibhushana was awarded by the Kotte Sangha Council of the Siyam Sector in Sri Lanka.
- 2003 – The Doctor of Philosophy Honorary Degree was conferred by the University of Ruhuna, Sri Lanka.

== International conferences ==
Delegate from the Theravada Education Association of Taiwan to the United Nations Vesak Day Conference Held in Bangkok, Thailand. Here, he made a presentation on the topic "Compassion Leads the Way" from 11 to 15 May 2011.

In collaboration with the Pure Land Learning College in Australia, Ven Chandima organized the "Interculture and Interfaith for Peace Dialogue" international conference in Sri Lanka on 2 November 2012. Among the delegates who featured in this international conference were Master Chin Kung, Katalin Bogyay, the President of the 36th General Conference of UNESCO, UNESCO ambassadors, and religious leaders in Sri Lanka.

In 2014 he organised the Vesak Celebration at the UNESCO Headquarters in Paris. The celebration took place on 21–22 May 2014. First Lady of Sri Lanka Shiranthi Rajapakhsa, Cardinal Malcolm Ranjith and many other delegates attended the ceremony.

== Editorial work ==
The Book of Protection (Piruwana Pothwahanse, පිරැවාණා පොත්වහන්සේ in Sinhalese characters) was edited and distributed free among the Sri Lankan temples. The book has become popular for the use in the whole night chanting, a traditional Buddhist ritual in Sri Lanka.
