= Sevanagala =

Sevanagala සෙවණගල
- Location within Sri Lanka
- Coordinates: 6°23′12″N 80°54′33″E
- Country: Sri Lanka
- District: Monaragala District, Sri Lanka

Area
  - Land: 123.98 km^{2} (47.87 sq mi)

Population
  - Total: 42,894
  - Density: 333/km^{2} (860/sq mi)
- Time zone: UTC+5:30 (Sri Lanka Standard Time Zone)
  - Summer (DST): UTC+6

Sevanagala is a rural area which is situated in western circumscription of Monaragala district. Sevanagala is a divisional secretariat and it consists of 14 Grama Niladhari Divisions (GND), which are further divided into 77 villages. Majority of Monaragala district population is represented from this region and the single majority of the ethnic group is Sinhalese while majority are Buddhists in religion. Embilipitiya is the closest city and it is situated 12 km away from here. The climatic condition of this area shows characteristics of a dry zone throughout the year though, November to December it has much cooler environment due to North East monsoon rains.

== Economy ==
Main income generation source of the people living in Sevanagala area is agricultural farming (more than 80%) while others are depend on animal husbandry (cattle and buffalo rearing), small scale trades and household income generation sources. Sevanagala Sugar Factory also plays a major role in the economy of the area.

Majority of the farmers in Sevanagala solely depend on sugar cane cultivation around two decades whereas the trend is now being declined with low profitability. Paddy, banana, papaw and vegetables are more popular among the younger generation as major crops due to higher income level. Many farmers now move away from Sugarcane to other crops as the profit they can obtain from sugarcane is comparatively low. As a result, it directly effects to country's sugar production and a large amount of foreign exchange has to be spent over the imports.

=== Sugar cane cultivation ===
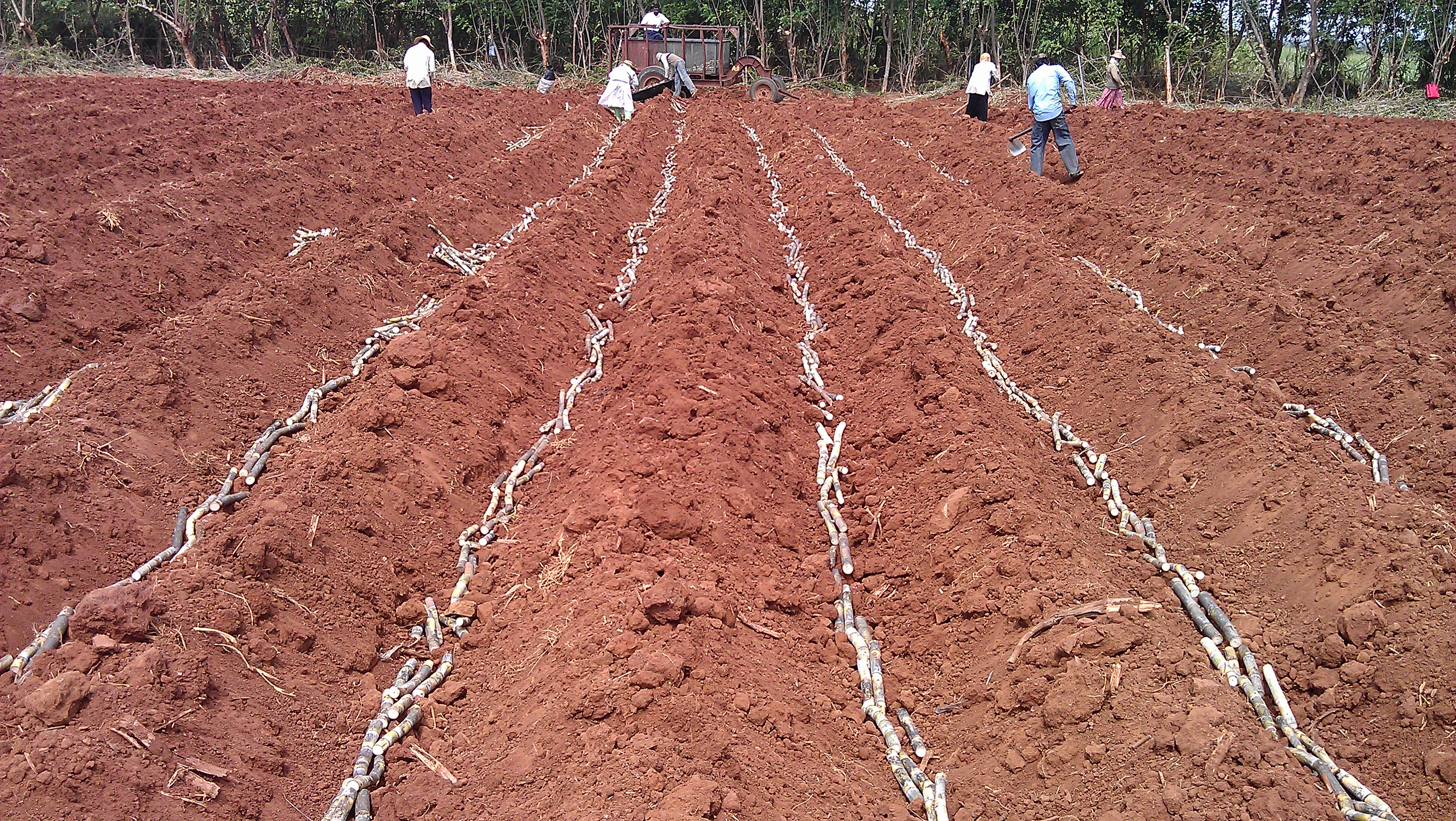
using ridge and furrow method for planting sugar cane setts in Sevanagala sugar factory plantation

Sevanagala area is much popular among the nation for the sugar cane cultivation since 1986. Arable lands which are used for sugarcane cultivation in Sevanagala area is around 3860 ha. Sugarcane cultivation are carried on under irrigated and rain fed conditions mostly with conventional agronomic practices. Sevanagala sugarcane plantation-factory-distillery complex which was established in 1986 with a production capacity of 1430 TCD of sugar and 60 tonnes of molasses per day is continuing operations at 1250 TCD of sugar 60 tonnes of molasses per day.
