= Army War College (Sri Lanka) =

Sri Lanka Army training institution

- Motto: Service through wisdom
- Type: staff college
- Established: 23 January 2012
- Affiliations: Sabaragamuwa University of Sri Lanka
- Postgraduates: 300
- Location: Buttala, Sri Lanka

The Army War College (AWC) is a defence service training institution of the Sri Lanka Army located in Buttala, Monaragala District, Uva Province. The AWC provides command and staff courses for mid career officers of Sri Lanka Army as well as to a limited number of officers from Sri Lanka Navy, Sri Lanka Air Force and officers of various allied forces.

It was opened on 23 January 2012 as the Officer Career Development Centre (OCDC) and was renamed the Army War College in 2021. It is affiliated to the Sabaragamuwa University of Sri Lanka. The Naval and Maritime Academy and the Sri Lanka Air Force Junior Command & Staff College conducts similar courses for mid-career officers of the Sri Lanka Navy and the Sri Lanka Air Force.

== History ==
With the rapid expansion of the Sri Lankan Army with the escalation of the Sri Lankan civil war, the army saw the need to enhance command and staff training for its senior subalterns and junior field officers since it depended on friendly nations for staff college training which amounted to only a few slots per year. With the re-designation of the former Army Training Centre as the Sri Lanka Military Academy (SLMA) in 1981, the Officers Study Centre (OSC) was established in the SLMA to conduct the Junior Staff Course, the Senior Tactics Course and the Senior Administration Course. Aimed at mid-career officers to develop basic command and staff techniques in the British tradition, for staff officer grade III/II appointments (officers in the ranks of Lieutenant / Captain / Major). With the end of the civil war, the Army established the Officer Career Development Centre in 2012 as a junior staff college with the Junior Command Course (JCC) and the Junior Staff Course (JSC) transferred to it from the OSC. OCDC initiated the Unit Command Course in 2018 and replaced it with the Senior Command Course for prospective battalion commanders in 2021. In December 2021, the OCDC was renamed as the Army War College.

== Courses ==
- Senior Command Course (SCC) - 13 week course aimed at Lieutenant Colonels and Majors to become successful battalion commanders.
- Junior Command Course (JCC) - 13 week course aimed at Majors and Captains to become successful grade II level command, staff, and instructional appointments.
- Junior Staff Course (JSC) - 13 week course aimed at Captains and Lieutenants to become successful grade III level staff appointments.

== See also ==
- Higher Command and Staff Course
- Defence Services Command and Staff College
- Army School of Logistics
- Naval and Maritime Academy
- Sri Lanka Air Force Junior Command & Staff College
- Army War College, Mhow
