= Kanabiso Pokuna Raja Maha Vihara =

Buddhist temple in Monaragala District, Sri Lanka

- කණබිසෝ පොකුණ රජ මහා විහාරය
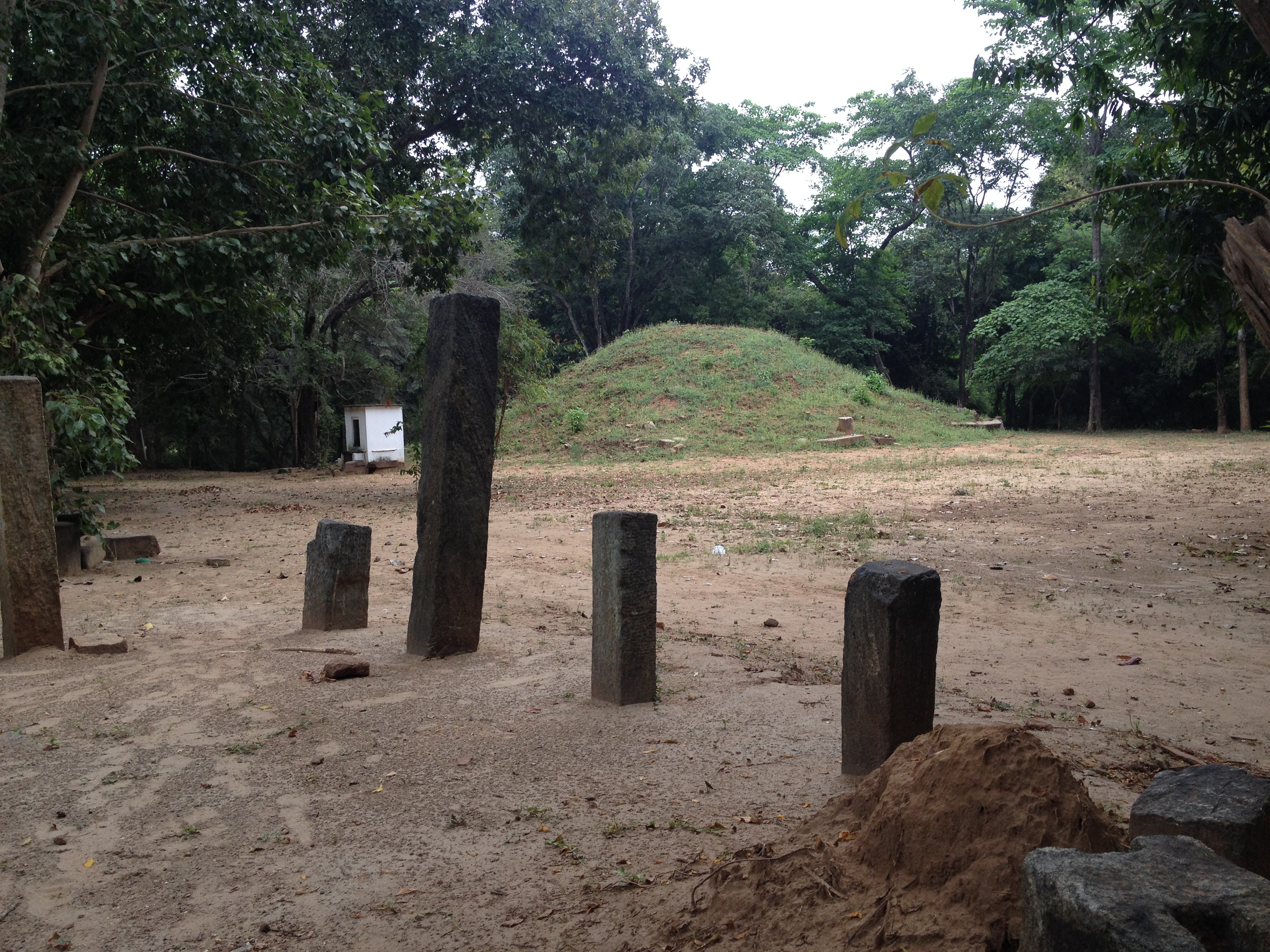
- The Stupa with scattered stone columns

Religion
- Affiliation: Buddhism
- District: Monaragala
- Province: Uva Province

Location
- Location: Handapanagala, Wellawaya
- Country: Sri Lanka
- Interactive map of Kanabiso Pokuna Raja Maha Vihara
- Coordinates: 06°39′17.8″N 81°08′54.1″E

Architecture
- Type: Buddhist Temple

Kanabiso Pokuna Raja Maha Vihara (Sinhala: කණබිසෝ පොකුණ රජ මහා විහාරය) is an ancient Buddhist temple in Monaragala District, Sri Lanka. The temple is located in Handapanagala village approximately 12 km (7.5 mi) distance from Wellawaya town. The temple has been formally recognised by the Government as an archaeological site in Sri Lanka. The designation was declared on 22 November 2002 under the government Gazette number 1264.

== The temple ==
The temple is situated on Handapanagala-Ulkanda road about 4 km (2.5 mi) off from the Wellawaya-Tissamaharama (A2) highway. It is believed that this temple was constructed by King Dutugamunu (161 BC – 137 BC). Among the archaeological remains a ruined Stupa, scattered stone columns, and two dripledged caves are identified. The Stupa is almost in the dilapidated state, resembling a large mound of earth.
