= Madulla =

- Village
- Location within Sri Lanka
- Coordinates: 7.3108°N 81.3929°E
- Country: Sri Lanka
- Province: Uva
- District: Moneragala
- Time zone: UTC+5:30 (Sri Lanka Standard Time)
- Postal code: 22256

Madulla is a village located in the Moneragala District of Uva Province, Sri Lanka.

The village is situated on the Inginiyagala Road (B527), adjacent to the Gal Oya National Park.

== See also ==
- List of towns in Uva
