= Buttala Divisional Secretariat =

- Divisional Secretariat
- Interactive map of Buttala Divisional Secretariat
- Country: Sri Lanka
- Province: Uva Province
- District: Moneragala District
- Time zone: UTC+5:30 (Sri Lanka Standard Time)

Buttala Divisional Secretariat is a Divisional Secretariat of Moneragala District, of Uva Province, Sri Lanka.

== Demography ==
Religion in Buttala DS Division (2012)
1. Buddhist (98.0%)
2. Hindu (0.60%)
3. Muslim (0.90%)
4. Roman Catholic (0.30%)
5. Other Christian (0.10%)
6. Other (0.00%)

== History ==
Buttala has been introduced as a special land area which belonged to the Ruhana Kingdom. It was an important destination of the route of the King Dutugemunu, who marched towards the northern region after organizing the army for the battle with King Elara.

== Landmarks ==
The Mligavia region is a historically important region located in the Buttala Divisional Secretaiate. The region contains a re-erection of the 34-foot Buddha statue, which was built by King Aggabodi, a famous ruler of Ruhana. It has been subjected to the high respects of thousands of Buddhists and Sri Lankans alike. This statue is built out of rocks and doesn't require any support to stand.
