= Dematamal Viharaya =

Dematamal Vihara
- දෙමටමල් විහාරය
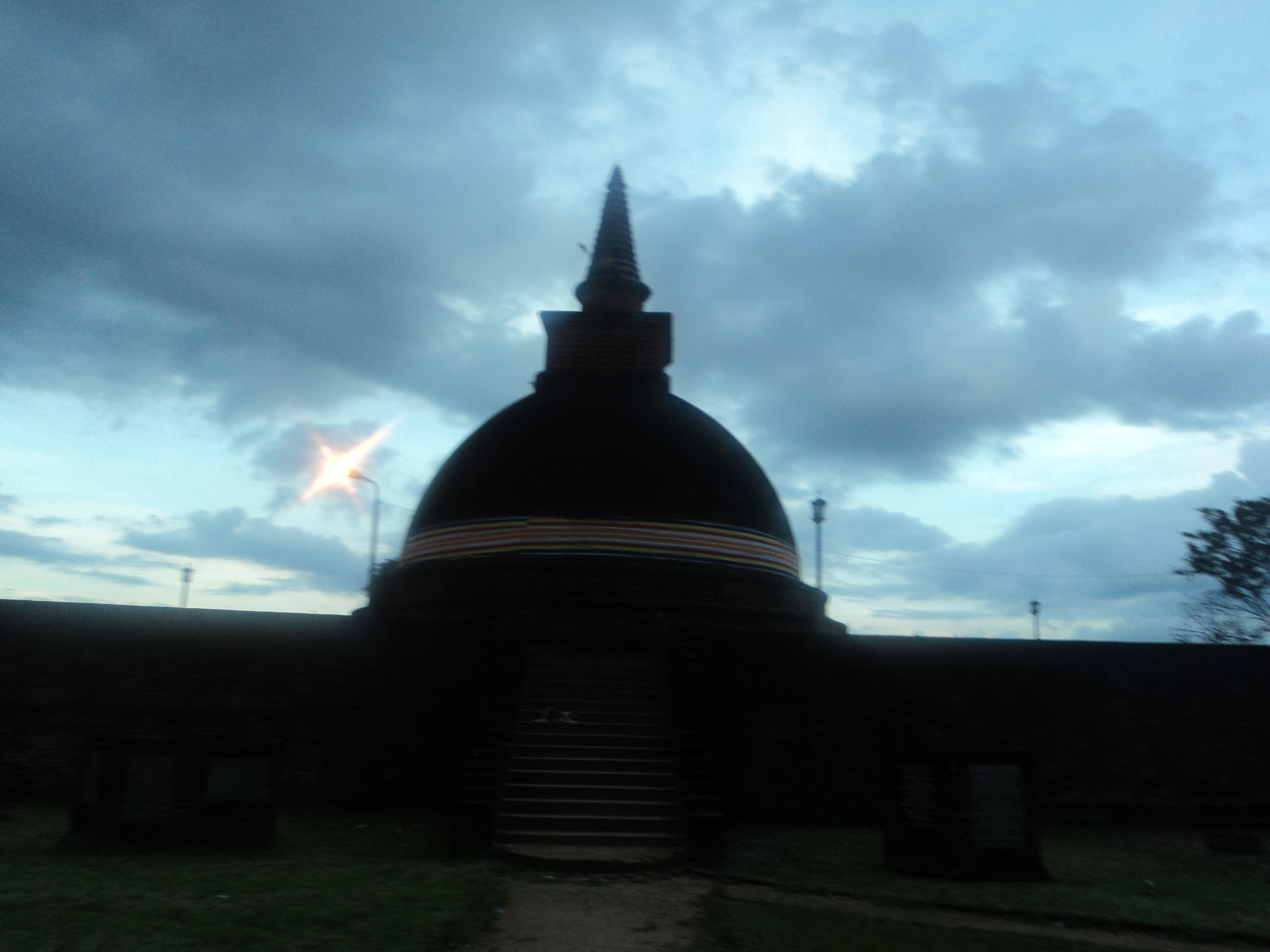

Religion
- Affiliation: Buddhism
- District: Monaragala
- Province: Uva Province

Location
- Location: Okkampitiya, Sri Lanka
- Interactive map of Dematamal Vihara
- Coordinates: 06°45′23″N 81°17′16.5″E

Architecture
- Type: Buddhist Temple

Dematamal Viharaya is a Buddhist temple in Okkampitiya village, Monaragala district, Sri Lanka. The Stupa of Dematamal Viharaya is considered as one of the oldest Stupas in Sri Lanka built in the 2nd Century BC.

According to folklore, it is the place which provided safety to Prince Saddhatissa, who was attempting to flee after losing the fight with his elder brother, Prince Dutugamunu.

== See also ==
- Maligawila Buddha statue
- Yudaganawa
