= Badalkumbura Divisional Secretariat =

- Divisional Secretariat
- Interactive map of Badalkumbura Divisional Secretariat
- Coordinates: 6.8725°N 81.2175°E
- Country: Sri Lanka
- Province: Uva Province
- District: Moneragala District
- Time zone: UTC+5:30 (Sri Lanka Standard Time)

Badalkumbura Divisional Secretariat is a Divisional Secretariat of Moneragala District, of Uva Province, Sri Lanka.

Religion in Badalkumbura DS Division
1. Buddhist (85.6%)
2. Hindu (9.04%)
3. Muslim (4.52%)
4. Roman Catholic (0.73%)
5. Other Christian (0.12%)
6. Other (0.00%)
