= Buttala =

- Buttala (බුත්තල) is a town in Sri Lanka. It is located in Monaragala District of Uva Province, Sri Lanka.

== History ==
The history of Buttala goes back to the time of King Dutugamunu in the 2nd century BC, when it was known as Guthala. The Mahavamsa chronicle of ancient Sri Lanka states that when Dutugamunu's army passed through Buttala en route to Rajarata in the north to wage war on Elara. The names of many places are derived from ancient times, often from the names of the generals of armies, as in the case of Buttala. Buttala faced minor earthquakes in February 2023. The famous yudaganawa stupa located in just two kilometers away from town.

== Industries ==
Buttala is the home of the largest sugar mill in Sri Lanka, Pelwatte Sugar Industries PLC, which was established in 1981. The company employs approximately 4,200 employees and over 300,000 sugarcane farmers.

== Population ==
Name	status	2012-03-20
Buttala	Divisional Secretariat	53084

- population Density 74.66/km^{2} .
- Area 711 km^{2}

Age Groups (c 2012)
0–14 years	13600
15–64 years	36782
65+ years	2702

== Education ==
Dutugemunu national college is the leading school with in city limits.

school	Type	students
Dutugemunu national school, Buttala	1AB	2401
Vijayabhahu maha vidyala, Okkampitiya	1AB	889
Pellawatte navodya maha vidyala, Uva pellawatte	1AB	1251
Siddhartha maha vidyalaya, Horabokka	1C	468
Waguruwela maha vidyalaya, Rajamawatha	1C	654
Ranjan wijerathna maha vidyalaya	1C	767

== Demographics ==
Ethnicity		
Sinhalese	52,211	98.36%
sri lanka moor	423	0.80%
Sri lanka tamil	408	0.77%
indian tamil	12	0.02%
Burger	8	0.02%
Sri lanka chetty	8	0.02%
Malay	2	0.00%
others	12	0.02%

Religion		
Buddhists	52,042	98.04%
Islam	468	0.88%
Hindus	340	0.64%
Roman Catholic	163	0.31%
Other Christian	71	0.13%
Other	0	0.00%

== Defence ==
Army war college training institution of the Sri Lanka Army located in Buttala.
