= Sambuddhatva jayanthi =

Buddhist festival

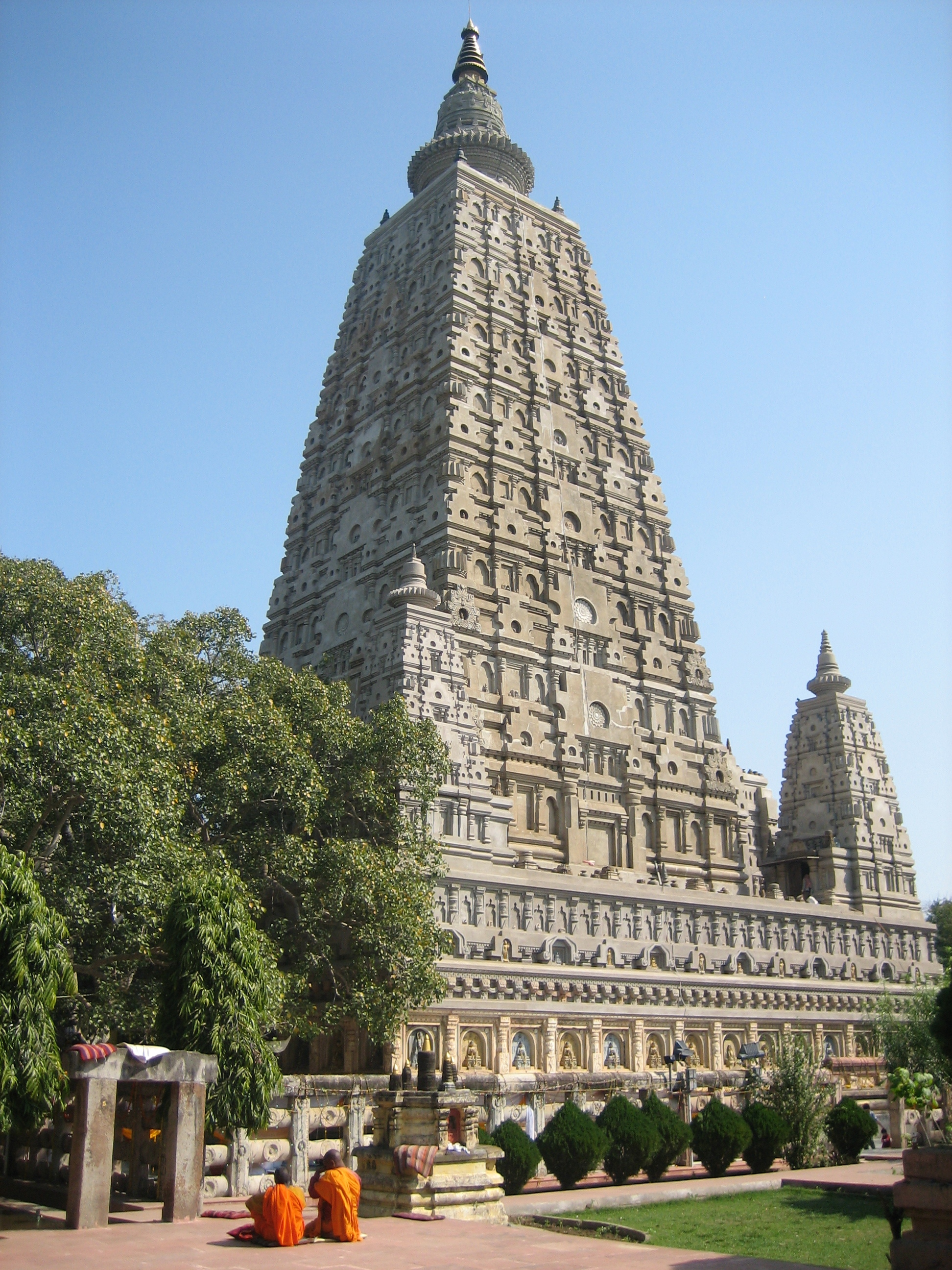
Bodhgaya, The place where Buddha attained Enlightenment

Sambuddhatva jayanthi, also known as Sambuddha jayanthi, is a religious festival in relation with the Vesak. In the Buddhist world it is celebrated in several Theravada countries including Sri Lanka, India and in Buddhist communities of other countries. Buddha's Enlightenment is highlighted and teachings of Buddha preserved in Pāli Canon become more popular in this period among Buddhists who follow the Theravada.
