= Yudaganawa =

- Town
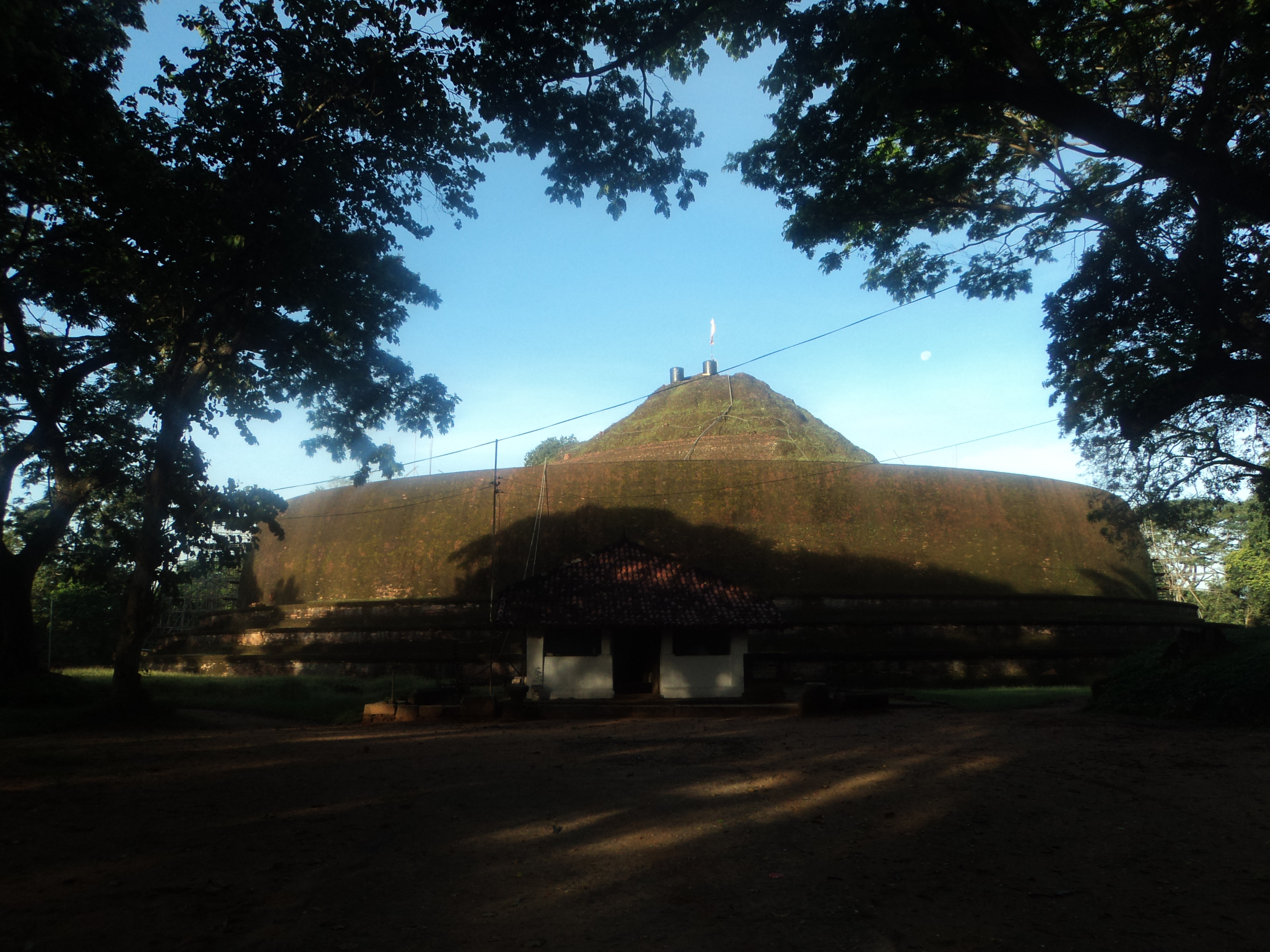
- Yudaganawa Stupa

- Location in Sri Lanka
- Coordinates: 6°46′N 81°14′E
- Country: Sri Lanka
- Province: Uva Province
- Time zone: UTC+5:30 (Sri Lanka Standard Time Zone)

Yudaganawa, is a town situated in Buttala Divisional Secretariat, Uva province, Sri Lanka.

== Yudaganawa Chaitya ==
The Chaitya at Yudaganawa has a circumference of 317 m (1,040 ft) and was initially thought to be a Kota Vehera - a large stupa built half way with a smaller stupa built on top of that. Recent archaeological excavations however have proved that this was not a Kota Vehera but at one time was a complete stupa.

According to the historic chronicle, Rajaveliya, this is the location where two brothers, Prince Dutugemunu and Prince Saddatissa had a battle over the throne of the kingdom. Prince Saddatissa lost the battle and fled to take refuge in Dematamal viharaya at Okkampitiya. The Queen Mother, Viharamahadevi, was saddened by the animosity between her two sons, pleaded with them to make amends. As a result, the two brothers made peace with each other and to mark this a colossal stupa was erected on the battlefield where they had fought. Some historians believe that it was the site of an already existing chaitya, which was then reconstructed and named Yudagana Chaitya.

== Yudaganawa Wewa ==
Nearby to Yudagana Chaitya is the Yudaganawa Wewa. It is believed that the clay needed to make bricks for the chaitya was dug from here. According to the chronicles, the wewa had been built by King Mahanaga in 300 BC. In 1950 it was renovated by the Irrigation Department. It covers an area of 61 ha (150 acres) and provides irrigation to 102 ha (250 acres) of paddy field cultivation.

== See also ==
- Maligawila Buddha statue
- Dematamal viharaya
