= Monaragala =

Monaragala මොණරාගල திருமயில்கல்மலை
- Town
- Location within Sri Lanka
- Coordinates: 6.872575°N 81.33728°E
- Country: Sri Lanka
- Province: Uva Province
- District: Monaragala
- Elevation: 151 m (495 ft)

Population (2012)
  - Total: 10,123
- Time zone: UTC+05:30 (SLT)

Monaragala (Sinhala: මොනරාගල, romanized: Monarāgala; Tamil: மொணராகலை, romanized: Moṇarākalai) is a town located in Monaragala District, Uva Province, Sri Lanka. It is the largest town and the capital of Monaragala District and is located 57.3 km (35.6 mi) southeast of Badulla, the capital city of Uva Province. Monaragala is situated about 151 m (495 ft) above sea level on the Colombo-Batticaloa main road.

Close to Moneragala, the rock temple Moneragala Rajamaha Viharaya, also named Mayuragiri Len Viharaya, consists of various caves with wall paintings and statues. In Maligavila one of the tallest Buddha statues of Sri Lanka can be located. Monaragala is a Sinhalese stronghold on the island.Ethnic composition in Monaragala DS Division according to the 2012 census is as follows Sihalese-42,779-86.39%, Tamils-6,323-12.77%, Muslims-341-0.69%, Others-77-0.16%.

== See also ==
- List of towns in Sri Lanka
- Monaragala District
- Uva Province
