= Districts of Sri Lanka =

Second-level administrative divisions of Sri Lanka

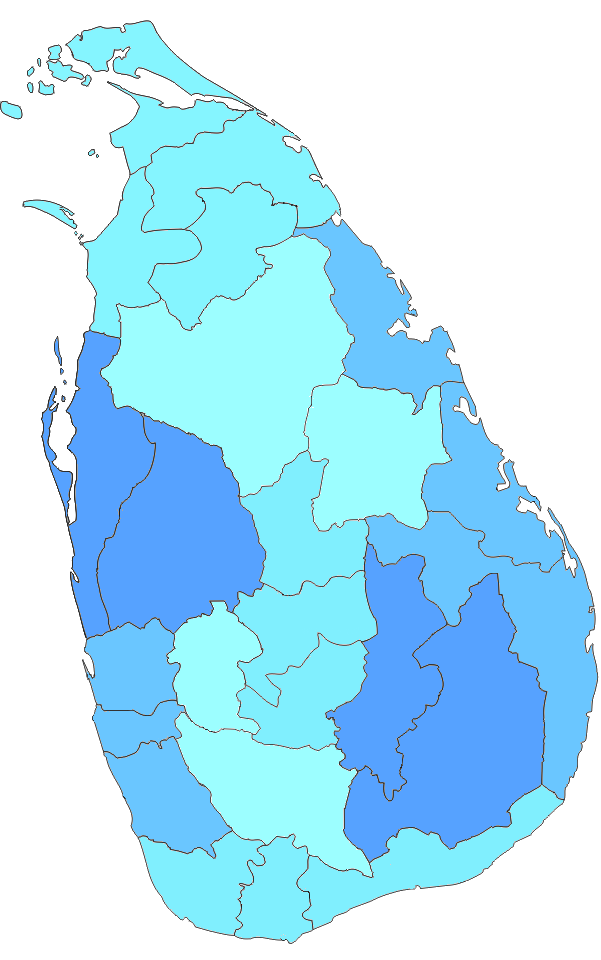
- Category: Second level administrative division
- Location: Sri Lanka
- Number: 25
- Populations: 92,238–2,324,349
- Areas: 699–7,179 km^{2}
- Government: District secretariat
- Subdivisions: D.S. divisions

Districts (Sinhala: දිස්ත්‍රි‌ක්‌ක, romanized: Distrikka, Tamil: மாவட்டம், romanized: Māvaṭṭam) are the second level administrative divisions of Sri Lanka, preceded by provinces. Sri Lanka has 25 districts organized into 9 provinces. Districts are further divided into a number of divisional secretariats (commonly known as D.S. divisions), which are in turn subdivided into 14,022 grama niladhari divisions. There are 331 DS divisions in Sri Lanka.

Each district is administered by a district secretary, who is appointed by the central government. The main tasks of the district secretariat involve coordinating communications and activities of the central government and divisional secretariats. The district secretariat is also responsible for implementing and monitoring development projects at the district level and assisting lower-level subdivisions in their activities, as well as revenue collection and coordination of elections in the district.

== History ==
The country was first divided into several administrative units during the Anuradhapura Kingdom. The kingdom was divided into three provinces; Rajarata, Ruhuna and Malaya Rata. These were further subdivided into smaller units called rata. Over time, the number of provinces increased, but the second-level administrative division continued to be the rata. However, with the country eventually being divided into more than one kingdom and with foreign colonial missions landing and taking parts of the country under their control, this structure began to change. The territory of the Kotte Kingdom was organized into four disavas, which were further subdivided into forty korales. The korales had their own civil and military officials with a small militia. The Jaffna kingdom appears to have had a similar administrative structure to this with four provinces.

When the Portuguese took over parts of the country after their arrival in 1505, they maintained more or less the same administrative structure followed by Sri Lankan rulers. During the Dutch rule in the country, the terrain under their control was divided into three administrative divisions. These were subdivided into disavas as in earlier systems. The British initially continued this system, but following reforms in 1796 to 1802, the country was divided according to ethnic composition. This was abolished by the Colebrook–Cameron reforms in 1833 and a legislative council was created, making the island a politically and administratively single unit. Five provinces were created, later expanded into nine, and these were subdivided into twenty-one districts. These districts were administered by officials known as Government Agents or Assistant Government Agents.

In 1955, the district replaced the province as the country's main administrative unit. The Ampara District was created in April 1961, followed by the creation of the Mullaitivu and Gampaha districts in September 1978 through a new constitution, which also reintroduced the provinces as the main administrative units. The newest district to be created was the Kilinochchi district in February 1984, and the current constitution states that the territory of Sri Lanka consists of 25 administrative districts. These districts may be subdivided or amalgamated by a resolution of the Parliament of Sri Lanka.

== Districts ==
All population data is from the most recent census of Sri Lanka, in 2012.

| District | Area map | Province | District capital | Land area in km^{2} (mi^{2}) | Inland water area in km^{2} (mi^{2}) | Total area in km ^{2} (mi^{2}) | Population (2012) | Population density per km^{2} (per mi^{2}) (Note: Population density has been calculated using the land area rather than the total area.) |
|---|---|---|---|---|---|---|---|---|
| Ampara | Area map of Ampara District, located along the east by south and south east coast and projecting into the interior of the country at the northern border, in the Eastern Province of Sri Lanka | (Eastern Province, Sri Lanka) Eastern | Ampara | 4,222 (1,630) | 193 (75) | 4,415 (1,705) | 649,402 | 154 (400) |
| Anuradhapura | Area map of Anuradhapura District, located somewhat to the north of the centre of the country, in the North Central Province of Sri Lanka | (North Central Province, Sri Lanka) North Central | Anuradhapura | 6,664 (2,573) | 515 (199) | 7,179 (2,772) | 860,575 | 129 (330) |
| Badulla | Area map of Badulla District which has its northern border near the centre of the country and extends to the south, located in the Uva Province of Sri Lanka | (Uva Province) Uva | Badulla | 2,827 (1,092) | 34 (13) | 2,861 (1,105) | 815,405 | 288 (750) |
| Batticaloa | Area map of Batticaloa District, located along the east by north coast, in the Eastern Province of Sri Lanka | (Eastern Province, Sri Lanka) Eastern | Batticaloa | 2,610 (1,010) | 244 (94) | 2,854 (1,102) | 526,567 | 202 (520) |
| Colombo | Area map of Colombo District, roughly rectangular in shape and extending inwards from the west south west coast in the Western Province of Sri Lanka | (Western Province, Sri Lanka) Western | Colombo | 676 (261) | 23 (8.9) | 699 (270) | 2,324,349 | 3,438 (8,900) |
| Galle | Area map of Galle District, converging inwards from the south west coast, in the Southern Province of Sri Lanka | (Southern Province, Sri Lanka) Southern | Galle | 1,617 (624) | 35 (14) | 1,652 (638) | 1,063,334 | 658 (1,700) |
| Gampaha | Area map of Gampaha District, extending inwards from the west by south west coast in a rough square shape, in the Western Province of Sri Lanka | (Western Province, Sri Lanka) Western | Gampaha | 1,341 (518) | 46 (18) | 1,387 (536) | 2,304,833 | 1,719 (4,450) |
| Hambantota | Area map of Hambantota District, lying along the coast from south to south east, in the Southern Province of Sri Lanka | (Southern Province, Sri Lanka) Southern | Hambantota | 2,496 (964) | 113 (44) | 2,609 (1,007) | 599,903 | 240 (620) |
| Jaffna | Area map of Jaffna District, in the peninsula to the north, in the Northern Province of Sri Lanka | (Northern Province, Sri Lanka) Northern | Jaffna | 929 (359) | 96 (37) | 1,025 (396) | 583,882 | 629 (1,630) |
| Kalutara | Area map of Kalutara District, extending inwards from the south west by west coast, in the Western Province of Sri Lanka | (Western Province, Sri Lanka) Western | Kalutara | 1,576 (608) | 22 (8.5) | 1,598 (617) | 1,221,948 | 775 (2,010) |
| Kandy | Area map of Kandy District, at the centre of the country with its south western boundary extending to the south, in the Central Province of Sri Lanka | (Central Province, Sri Lanka) Central | Kandy | 1,917 (740) | 23 (8.9) | 1,940 (750) | 1,375,382 | 716 (1,850) |
| Kegalle | Area map of Kegalle District, roughly oval in shape is located to the south east of the centre of the country, in the Sabaragamuwa Province of Sri Lanka | (Sabaragamuwa Province) Sabaragamuwa | Kegalle | 1,685 (651) | 8 (3.1) | 1,693 (654) | 840,648 | 499 (1,290) |
| Kilinochchi | Area map of Kilinochchi District, along the northern coast of the mainland and south of the Jaffna peninsula, in the Northern Province of Sri Lanka | (Northern Province, Sri Lanka) Northern | Kilinochchi | 1,205 (465) | 74 (29) | 1,279 (494) | 113,510 | 94 (240) |
| Kurunegala | Area map of Kurunegala District, to the west of the centre of the country with its northern border extending towards the north west, in the North Western Province of Sri Lanka | (North Western Province, Sri Lanka) North Western | Kurunegala | 4,624 (1,785) | 192 (74) | 4,816 (1,859) | 1,618,465 | 350 (910) |
| Mannar | Area map of Mannar District, along the north western coast with eastern border extending towards the interior, also including a large island roughly oval in shape, in the Northern Province of Sri Lanka | (Northern Province, Sri Lanka) Northern | Mannar | 1,880 (730) | 116 (45) | 1,996 (771) | 99,570 | 53 (140) |
| Matale | Area map of Matale District, located immediately north of the middle of the country, roughly the shape of a letter "C" and located in the Central Province of Sri Lanka | (Central Province, Sri Lanka) Central | Matale | 1,952 (754) | 41 (16) | 1,993 (770) | 484,531 | 248 (640) |
| Matara | Area map of Matara District, roughly rectangular in shape and extending inwards from the southern coast, in the Southern Province of Sri Lanka | (Southern Province, Sri Lanka) Southern | Matara | 1,270 (490) | 13 (5.0) | 1,283 (495) | 814,048 | 641 (1,660) |
| Monaragala | Area map of Monaragala District, located east of the centre of the country, has its south eat border extending towards the west, in the Uva Province of Sri Lanka | (Uva Province) Uva | Monaragala | 5,508 (2,127) | 131 (51) | 5,639 (2,177) | 451,058 | 82 (210) |
| Mullaitivu | Area map of Mullaitivu District, extending to the west from the north by east coast in the Northern Province of Sri Lanka | (Northern Province, Sri Lanka) Northern | Mullaitivu | 2,415 (932) | 202 (78) | 2,617 (1,010) | 92,238 | 38 (98) |
| Nuwara Eliya | Area map of Nuwara Eliya District, located immediately south of the middle of the country and running roughly south west to north east, in the Central Province of Sri Lanka | (Central Province, Sri Lanka) Central | Nuwara Eliya | 1,706 (659) | 35 (14) | 1,741 (672) | 711,644 | 417 (1,080) |
| Polonnaruwa | Area map of Polonnaruwa District, roughly square in shape, located at the middle from north east of the centre of the country and south west of the north eastern coast, in the North Central Province of Sri Lanka | (North Central Province, Sri Lanka) North Central | Polonnaruwa | 3,077 (1,188) | 216 (83) | 3,293 (1,271) | 406,088 | 132 (340) |
| Puttalam | Area map of Puttalam District, lying along the western coast, in the North Western Province of Sri Lanka | (North Western Province, Sri Lanka) North Western | Puttalam | 2,882 (1,113) | 190 (73) | 3,072 (1,186) | 762,396 | 265 (690) |
| Ratnapura | Area map of Ratnapura District, some distance from the south western coast with its western and southern borders converging towards the north west, in the Sabaragamuwa Province of Sri Lanka | (Sabaragamuwa Province) Sabaragamuwa | Ratnapura | 3,236 (1,249) | 39 (15) | 3,275 (1,264) | 1,088,007 | 336 (870) |
| Trincomalee | Area map of Trincomalee District, along the north eastern coast with its south western border extending inwards, in the Eastern Province of Sri Lanka | (Eastern Province, Sri Lanka) Eastern | Trincomalee | 2,529 (976) | 198 (76) | 2,727 (1,053) | 379,541 | 150 (390) |
| Vavuniya | Area map of Vavuniya District, located in the middle of the northern half of the country, running roughly in a south west—north east direction, in the Northern Province of Sri Lanka | (Northern Province, Sri Lanka) Northern | Vavuniya | 1,861 (719) | 106 (41) | 1,967 (759) | 172,115 | 92 (240) |
| Total | | | | 62,705 (24,211) | 2,905 (1,122) | 65,610 (25,330) | 20,359,439 | 325 (840) |

== See also ==
- ISO 3166-2:LK
