= Monaragala District =

Monaragala District මොණරාගල දිස්ත්‍රික්කය மொணராகலை மாவட்டம் Kandyan Era- Wellassa(වෙල්ලස්ස), Anuradhapura Era- Ata Dahas rata(අට දහස් රට)
- Administrative District
- Map of Sri Lanka with Monaragala District highlighted
- Coordinates: 6°40′N 81°20′E
- Country: Sri Lanka
- Province: Uva Province
- capital city and Largest Town: Monaragala
- DS Division: List: Monaragala; Buttala; Siyambalanduwa; Katharagama; Badalkumbura; Bibile; Medagama; Sewanagala; Thanamalwila; Dambagalla; Madulla

Government
  - District Secretary: Mr.R.M.Pasan.S.B.Rathnayake

Area
  - Total: 5,636 km^{2} (2,176 sq mi)
  - Land: 5,508 km^{2} (2,127 sq mi)
  - Water: 131 km^{2} (51 sq mi)
  - Rank: 2nd

Population (2012)
  - Total: 448,194
  - Density: 81.37/km^{2} (210.8/sq mi)

Ethnicity (2012 census)
  - Sinhalese: 423,972 (94.61%)
  - Tamil: 15,373 (3.43%)
  - Moors: 9,552 (2.13%)
  - Other: 245 (0.05%)

Religion (2012 census)
  - Buddhist: 423,648 (94.5%)
  - Hindu: 12,522 (2.8%)
  - Muslim: 9,702 (2.2%)
  - Christian: 2,224 (0.5%)
  - Other: 46 (0.0%)
- Time zone: UTC+05:30 (Sri Lanka)
- Telephone Code: 055
- ISO 3166 code: LK-82
- Vehicle registration: UP
- Official Language: Sinhala
- Website: www.monaragala.dist.gov.lk

Monaragala (Sinhala: මොණරාගල දිස්ත්‍රික්කය, Tamil: மொணராகலை மாவட்டம்) is a district in Uva Province of Sri Lanka. It is the 2^{nd} largest of the 25 districts in Sri Lanka, with an area of 5,636 km^{2} (2,176 sq mi). Historically known as Wellassa. The district is administered by a District Secretariat headed by a District Secretary appointed by the central government of Sri Lanka. The capital of the district is Monaragala.

== History ==
=== Prehistoric Period ===
The history of the Monaragala District dates back to the prehistoric era, substantiated by significant archaeological evidence discovered across the region. Archaeological findings in areas bordering the Uva Highlands, such as Bandarawela, suggest that the region was inhabited by prehistoric hunter-gatherer communities who utilized microlithic stone tools. It is believed that these nomadic groups migrated towards the dry zone plains and forests of Monaragala in search of food, establishing temporary settlements in caves and open-air sites. They subsisted by hunting animals such as deer and monitor lizards, and by foraging for wild fruits and tubers.

Prominent archaeological sites confirming this prehistoric presence include:

- Kurullangala: located on the border of Ella and Wellawaya, this site features a treacherous rock face adorned with prehistoric cave paintings estimated to be over 5,000 years old. These ancient depictions include imagery of giant birds, various animals, and human figures.
- Pillillagoda Lena (cave): a significant cave site used by prehistoric inhabitants. The cave features primitive paintings and line drawings etched directly onto the natural rock surface using fingers or crude wooden implements, without the use of plaster.

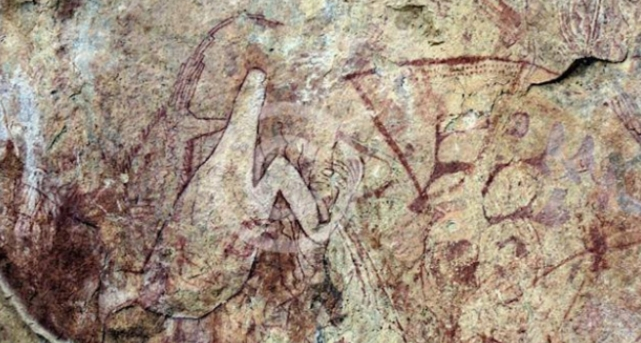

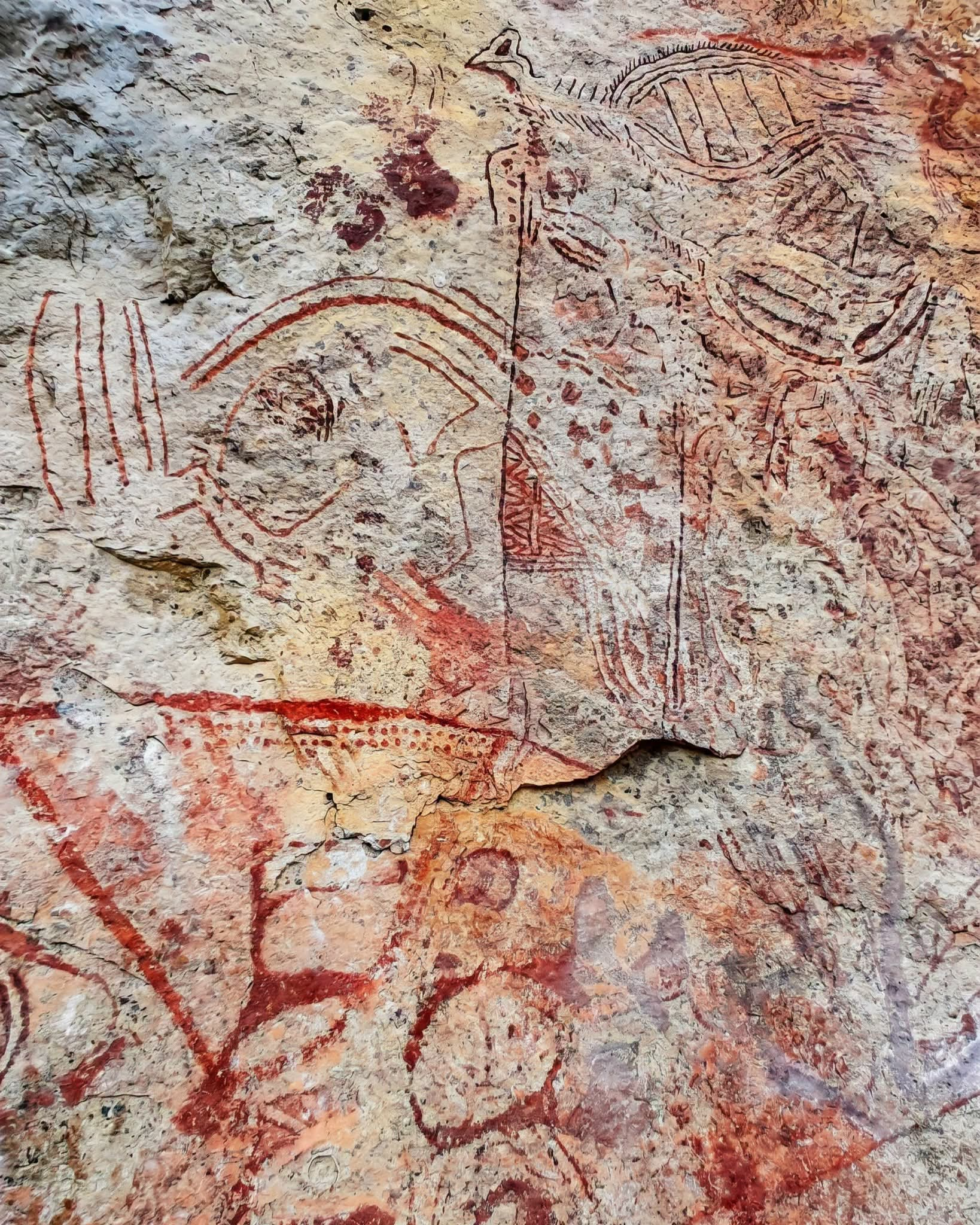
Pillillagoda cave paints

- Maligavila Alugal-ge: situated near the banks of the Hulanda Oya, this natural rock cave served as a dwelling for prehistoric humans. In later periods, it was converted into a Buddhist cave monastery, as evidenced by ancient inscriptions and ruins found in the vicinity.
- Mayuragiriya: located near Monaragala, this site consists of mountainous terrain with natural caves that served as temporary shelters for prehistoric hunter-gatherer groups.

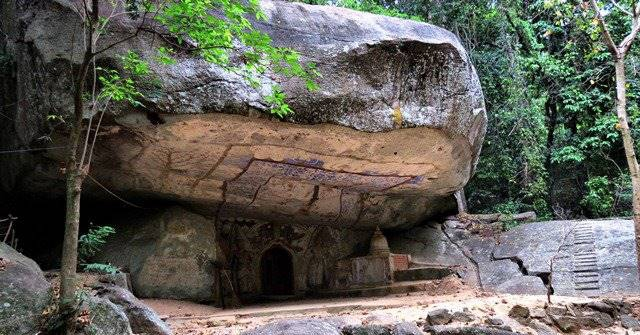
Mayuragiriya caves

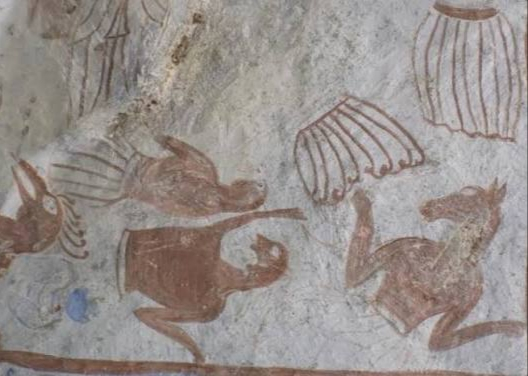
Mayuragiriya Cave Paints

These sites provide crucial insights into the evolutionary history of human activity in the region, highlighting the transition from nomadic hunter-gatherer lifestyles to settled ancient communities.

=== Proto-historic Period ===
The Proto-historic Iron Age in Sri Lanka (c. 1000 BCE – 500 BCE) marked a transformative period for the Monaragala region, characterized by the transition from nomadic hunter-gatherer lifestyles to settled agrarian communities. The fertile river basins of the Wellassa region, particularly along the Kumbukkan Oya, Menik Ganga, and Hada Oya, provided an ideal environment for this shift.

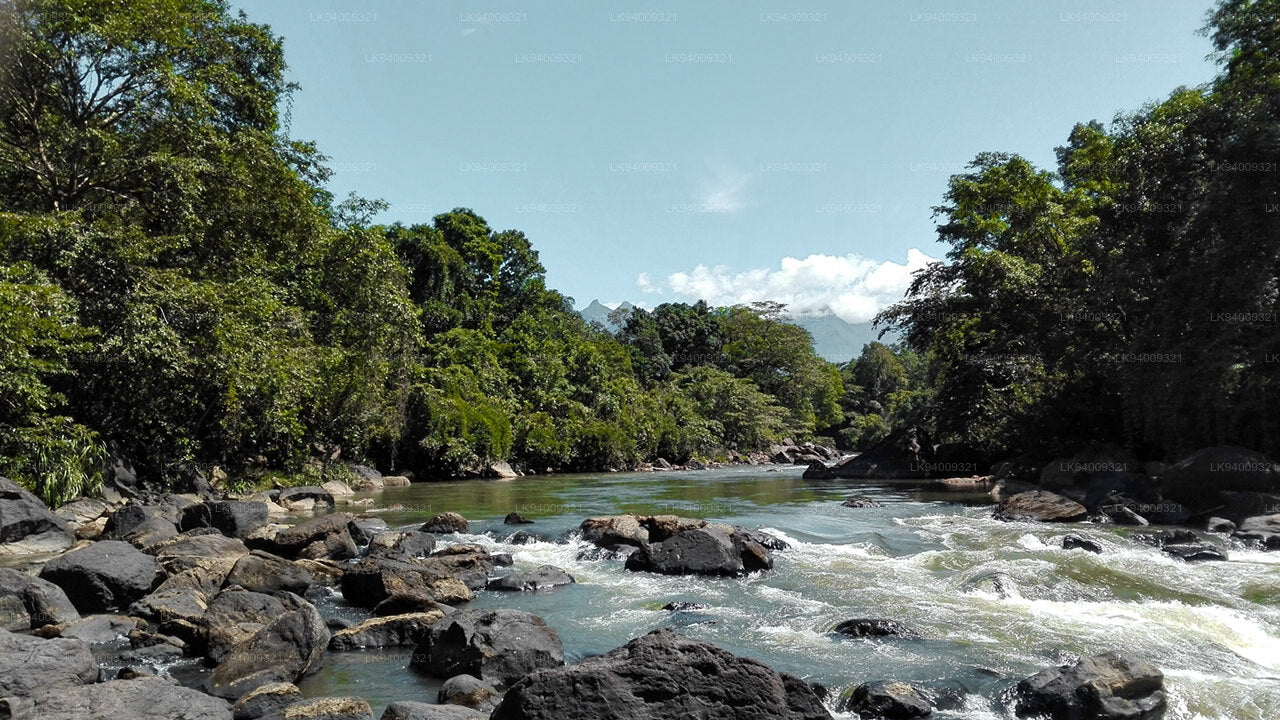
Kumbukan oya

==== Key Socio-Economic developments ====
- Agrarian Expansion: the adoption of iron technology enabled the clearing of dense forests, facilitating large-scale paddy cultivation. This era witnessed the inception of small-scale tank cascade systems(Ellanga), laying the groundwork for the future hydraulic civilization of the Anuradhapura and Ruhuna Kingdoms.

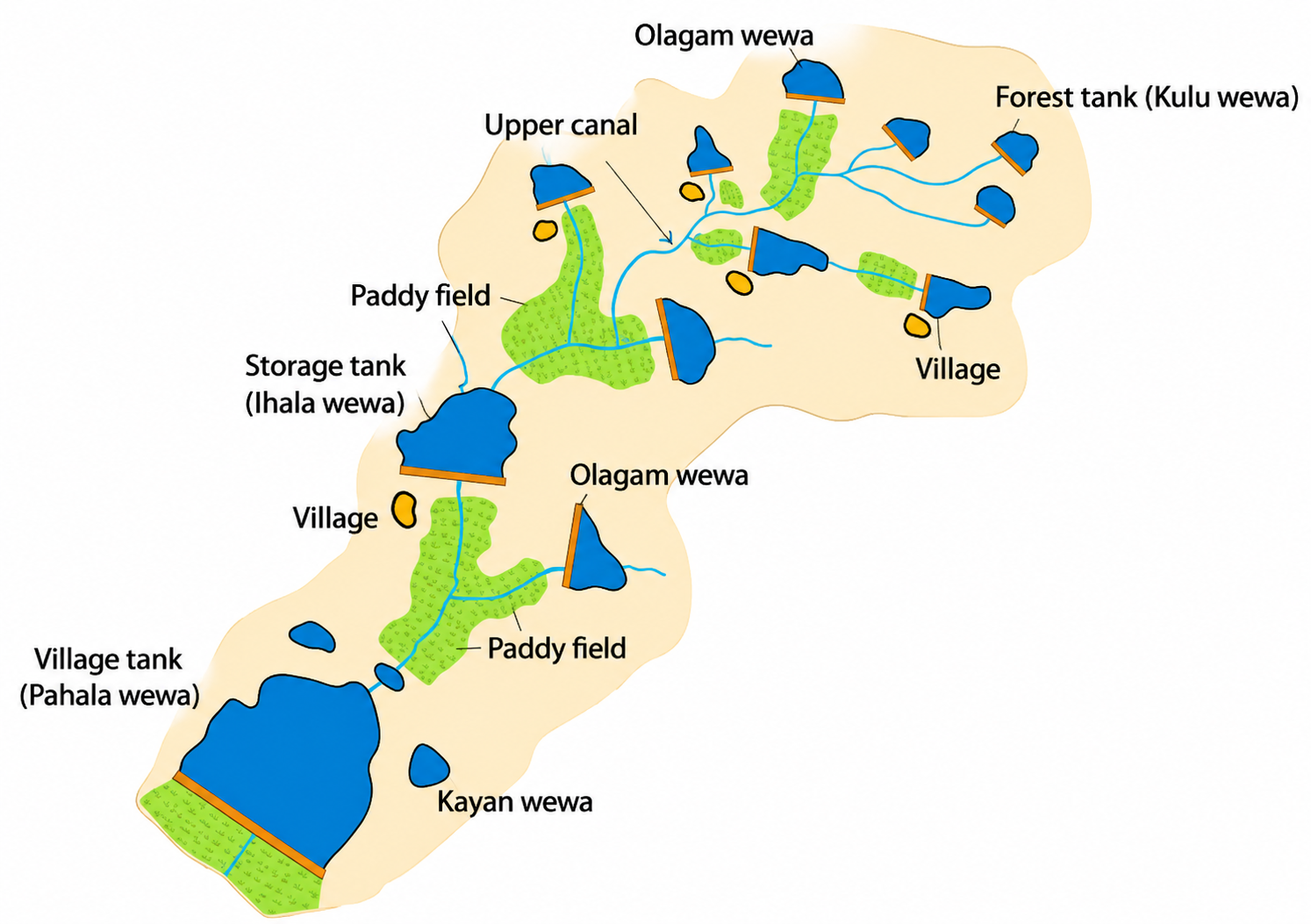
Small-Scale tank cascade system(Ellangava)

- Domesticated Agriculture: the introduction of iron implements, such as axes and hoes, allowed for systematic farming. Evidence suggests the domestication of cattle and horses, supporting agricultural labor and food security.
- Technological Advancement: the region’s inhabitants demonstrated mastery over ceramic production, specifically Black and Red Ware (BRW). This pottery, created through reduction-alternative firing techniques, was widely used for food storage and cooking.

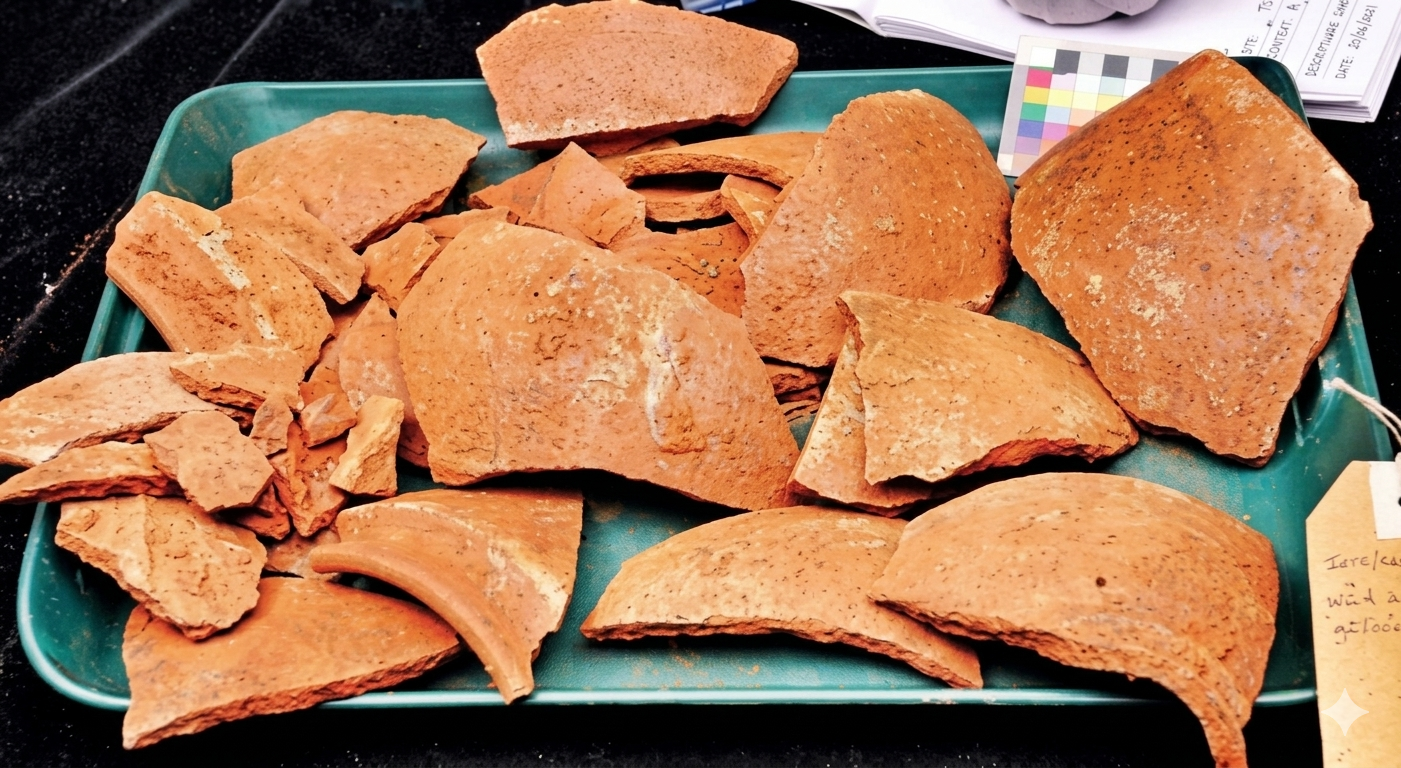
Proto-historic Iron Age ceramic artifacts

- Trade and Ornamentation: the discovery of glass and mineral beads indicates that the region engaged in regional trade networks, possibly extending to Southern India.

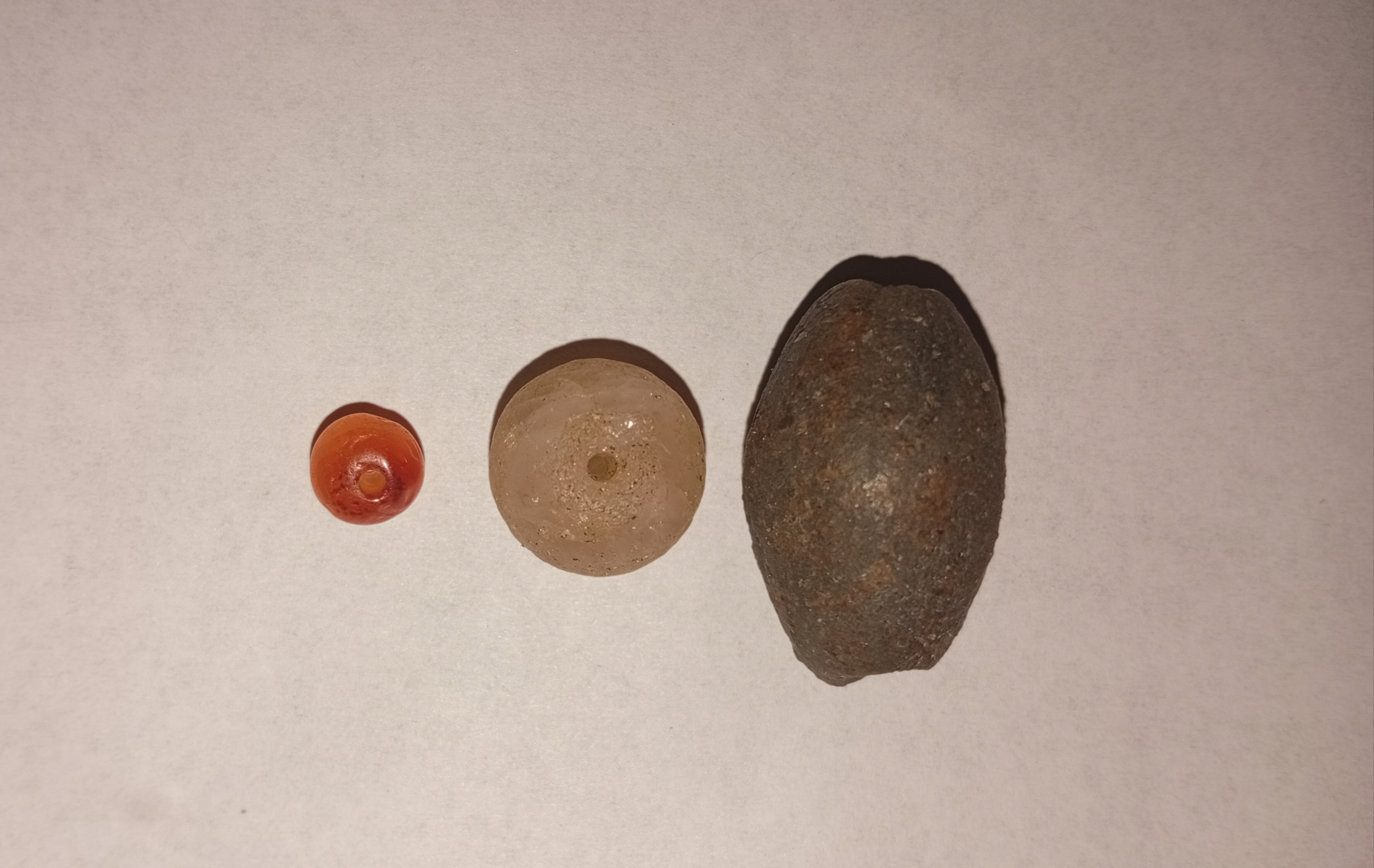
Ancient stone and mineral beads discovered in the Wellassa region

==== Burial customs and beliefs ====
The social organisation of this era is best understood through the Megalithic burial culture. The practice involved interring cremated remains in clay urns, protected by large stone slabs. The Uva-Wellassa region contains numerous such burial sites, where archaeological excavations have unearthed iron tools, arrowheads, and ritual offerings.

==== Iriyapola archaeological site ====
The Iriyapola ruins, located approximately 20 km (12 mi) southeast of the Maligavila archaeological site, serve as a primary site for understanding this era in Monaragala. Situated in a dense forest reserve near the confluence of the Gonamala Ara and the Kumbukkan Oya, the site reveals layers of habitation dating back to 1000 BCE – 300 BCE. Key findings include:

- Iron Smelting remains: the presence of iron slag and furnace remnants indicates that ancient settlers were involved in local iron extraction and tool manufacturing.
- Megalithic Burials: dispersed stone slabs and burial urns testify to a complex and organized belief system regarding death and community rituals.
- Ceramic Artifacts: excavated shards of Black and Red Ware demonstrate the sophisticated pottery techniques utilised by the community to sustain their agricultural lifestyle.
- Early Hydraulic Infrastructure: Remains of primitive stone bunds along the Gonamala Ara suggest early efforts to manage water resources for agricultural purposes.

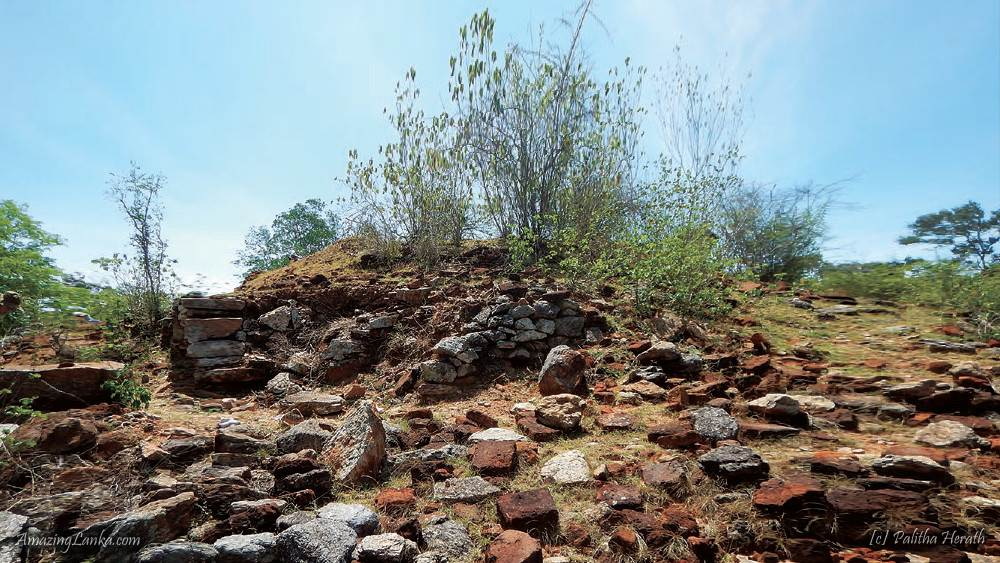
Iriyapola archaeological site

In summary, the Monaragala District and the broader Uva dry zone were not merely peripheral regions but were pivotal centres where early human communities harnessed iron technology to establish the foundations of Sri Lanka's sophisticated ancient civilisation.

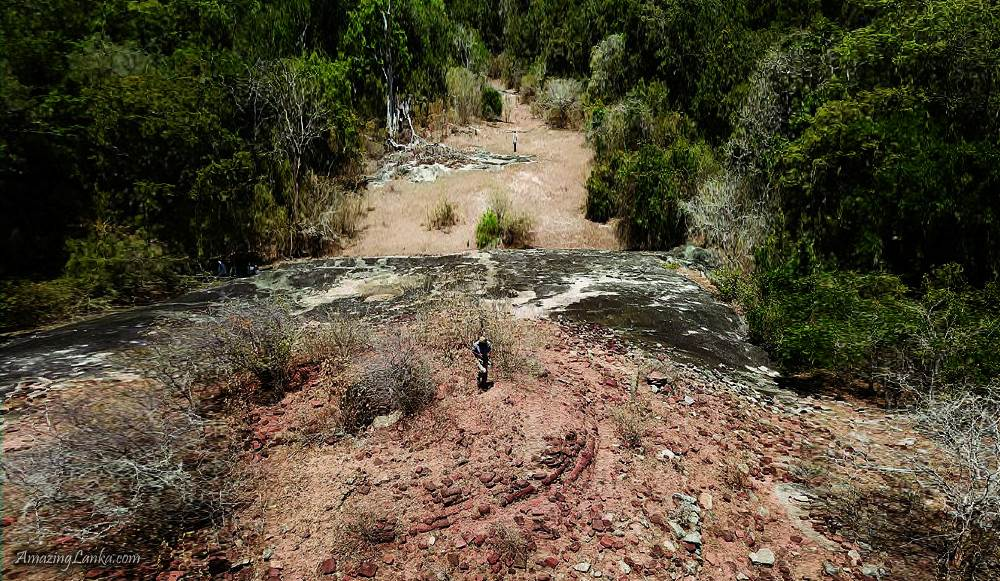

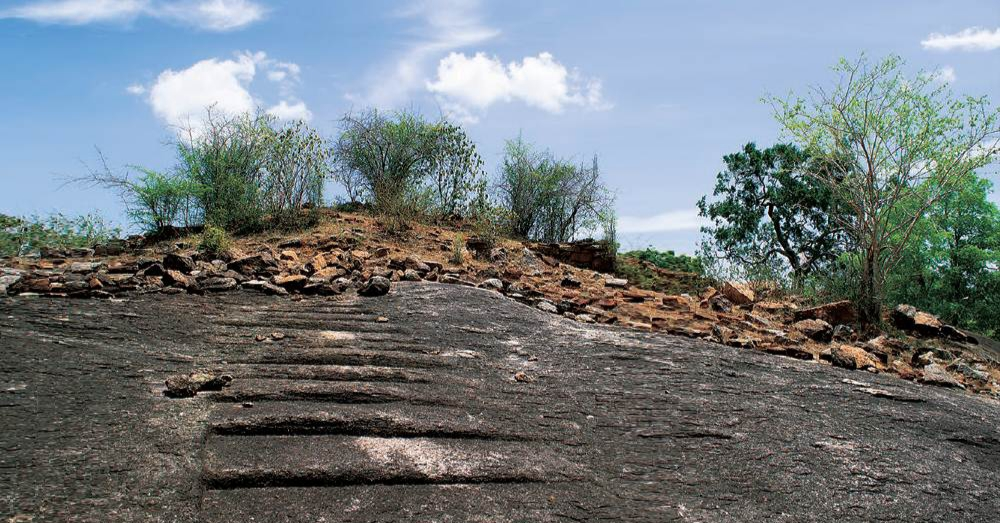

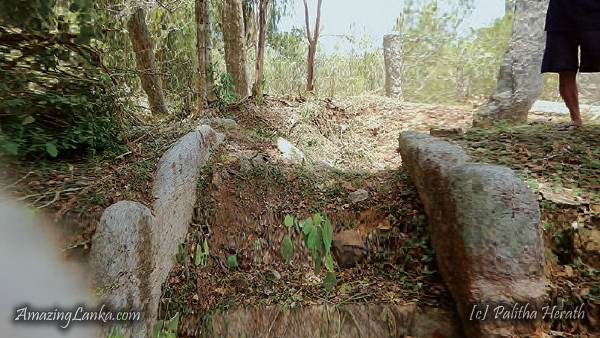
Iriyapola archaeological site

=== Historic Period ===
==== Anuradhapura period ====
The Monaragala District spans a major region of the ancient Rohana (Ruhuna) Kingdom, which played a pivotal political and religious role in Sri Lanka during the Anuradhapura and Polonnaruwa eras. Due to the lack of extensive archaeological excavations in the region, a vast number of historical sites still remain hidden and unexplored within its dense forests.

Historically, whenever the centralized seats of power in Anuradhapura or Polonnaruwa faced South Indian invasions, Sinhalese monarchs and their armies utilized the Ruhuna region, including Monaragala, as their strategic base for military reorganization and counter-offensives.

- King Dutugamunu and the Legacy of Wellassa

The earliest royal blueprints of the Ruhuna Kingdom are prominently linked to the reign of King Dutugamunu (2nd Century BCE). It was from this Rohana region, then ruled by his father King Kavan Tissa, that the grand army was mobilized to defeat King Elara.

Following the demise of King Kavan Tissa, a historic battle for the throne ensued between his sons, Prince Dutugamunu and Prince Saddhatissa, at the present-day Yudaganawa plains in Buttala. Today, the Yudaganawa Raja Maha Viharaya marks this historic battleground. Following his defeat in this battle, Prince Saddhatissa sought sanctuary with the Buddhist monks at the Dematamal Raja Maha Viharaya, which still stands today.

The Wellassa region was instrumental in King Dutugamunu’s campaign against Elara, serving as the primary supplier of weaponry and provisions (specifically rice) for the army. The name 'Wellassa' is derived from the Sinhala words 'Wel Laksaya', meaning 'a hundred thousand paddy fields', reflecting the agricultural prosperity of the area. Additionally, the Kataragama Maha Devalaya, a premier place of worship built under the patronage of King Dutugamunu to safeguard Buddhism and regional deities, is another landmark situated within this district.

- Influence of Mahayana Buddhism and Art

By the 7th Century CE, Wellassa had flourished into a highly prosperous region, during which Mahayana Buddhism experienced a significant resurgence in the area. The Maligawila Buddha Statue and the accompanying Bodhisattva statue stand as monumental evidence of this era. Cut entirely from a single limestone rock, the Maligawila Buddha statue is considered the tallest free-standing ancient Buddha statue in Sri Lanka.

Key Historical Note: This statue was commissioned by a prince named Aggabodhi. He also established a hospital for the sick at the site, providing some of the earliest archaeological evidence of ancient healthcare facilities in Sri Lanka.

Furthermore, dating back to the 9th–10th Centuries CE, the Buduruvagala archaeological site near Wellawaya features a colossal 51-foot-tall Buddha statue flanked by seven Mahayana figures carved into the rock face.

Collectively, these historical and archaeological marvels demonstrate that ancient Monaragala and the Wellassa region possessed a socio-religious grandeur that rivaled the northern kingdoms of Anuradhapura and Polonnaruwa.

== Towns in Monaragala district ==
Main towns

- Monaragala
- Bibile
- Buttala
- Wellawaya
- Kataragama
- Siyambalanduva
- medagama
- Thanamalvila
- Badalkubura
- Sevanagala
- madulla

Other towns

- Nakkala
- Ethimale
- Buddhama
- Hulandawa
- Dombagahawela
- Kumbukkana
- Okkampitiya
- Pelwatta
- Sella Katharagama

== Demographics ==
| Population | Land Area | Schools | Total Students |
|---|---|---|---|
| 527,585 | 282,200 Hectare | 262 | 97,721 |

| Division | Population |
|---|---|
| Wellawaya | 54,911 |
| Siyambalanduwa | 51,309 |
| Buttala | 51,186 |
| Monaragala | 45,922 |
| Sevanagala | 39,825 |
| Badalkumbura | 39,786 |
| Bibile | 38,386 |
| Medagama | 35,116 |
| Madulla | 30,672 |
| Thanamalwila | 25,063 |
| Kataragama | 24,455 |

=== Religion ===
Religion in Monaragala district (2024)
| Religion | Percent |
| Buddhism | 94.48% |
| Hinduism | 2.84% |
| Islam | 2.32% |
| Other or not stated | 0.36% |

Buddhism is the predominant religion in Monaragala.

| Religion | Population(2012) |
|---|---|
| Buddhism | 498,436 |
| Hinduism | 14,974 |
| Islam | 12,262 |
| Christianity | 1,894 |
| Other Religion | 19 |

=== Ethnicity ===
Ethnicity in Monaragala District (2024)
1. Sinhala (94.7%)
2. Sri Lankan Tamils (2.80%)
3. Sri Lankan Moors (2.29%)
4. Others (0.26%)

| Sinhala | Sri Lankan Tamil | Indian Tamil | Sri Lankan Moor |
|---|---|---|---|
| 94.5% | 1.4% | 1.9% | 2.0% |

In 2008 - Source

== Education ==
Historically, Monaragala served as a major educational center in Ruhuna, centered around large monastic complexes such as Yudaganawa, Dematamal Viharaya, Buduruvagala, Neelagiriya, and Athimale. However, following the 1818 Uva-Wellassa Rebellion and its aftermath, the district's educational infrastructure suffered a severe decline.

A notable characteristic of the Monaragala District is the absence of early missionary schools, with almost all educational institutions established on a Buddhist foundation. The oldest school in the district is Medagama National School, founded in 1898 by Mr. Don John da lahe.

Historically Significant Schools:

- Medagama National School (1898)
- Monaragala Mahanama College (1907)
- Wellassa Central College (1933)
- Buddama Maha Vidyalaya (1939)
- Monaragala Royal College (1969)

Major National Schools:

Out of approximately 262 schools in the district, a significant portion of the student capacity (around 45–50%) is concentrated within the following key national schools:

- Uva Royal College
- Monaragala Mahanama Central College
- Buttala Dutugemunu Central College
- Wellassa National School
- Malwattawela National School
- Kataragama President's College
- Nissanka National School
- Siyambalanduwa National School
- Bibile Yasodhara Girls College
- Thanamalwila National School

Special, Higher, and Vocational Education:

- International Schools: St. Anthony's College
- Special Needs Education: Mahanama College Special Needs Unit, Wellassa Saubhagya School for the Deaf and Blind (Kumbukkana)
- Higher and Vocational Education: Open University of Sri Lanka (Monaragala Center), National Youth Services Council (NYSC), and Vocational Training Authority (VTA) centers
- Military Education: Army War College (Buttala)"It is the premier institution in Sri Lanka for advanced career development and command training for Army officers."

(Additionally, plans are underway to establish several new faculties affiliated with the Uva Wellassa University within Monaragala district.)

== Major reservoirs ==
- Senanayake Reservoir
- Muthukandiya Reservoir
- Weheragala Reservoir
- Handapanagala Reservoir
- Udawalawa Reservoir
- Alikota ara Reservoir
- Mallipotha Lake

== Rivers ==
- Menik Ganga
- Hulanda oya
- Gal oya
- Heda oya
- Wila oya
- Kumbukkan Oya
- Kirindi oya
- ranwanna oya

== Tourist attractions ==
- Ruhunu maha Katharagama devalaya & Kiri vehera
- Maligawila
- Buduruwagala
- Govindahela rock(westminster abbey)
- Yala National Park
- Galoya National Park
- Udawalawa National Park
- Ellewela Waterfall
- Maragala mountain range
- Kotasara Piyangala Raja Maha Viharaya
- Mallipotha Lake

== See also ==
- History of Uva Province
