= List of settlements in Southern Province (Sri Lanka) =

Southern Province is a province of Sri Lanka, containing the Galle District, Hambantota District, and Matara District. The following is a list of settlements in the province.

== A ==
Abesekaragama, Abeyesekaragama, Acharigama, Acharigoda, Addarawellana, Agala Kanda, Agalaboda, Agaliya, Aggarahere, Ahangama, Akuressa, Ambalangoda

== B ==
Babarenda Central, Babarenda North, Babarenda South I, Babarenda South II, Badabadda, Badahelagoda, Badalgeda, Baddegama, Baddegama East, Baddegama North, Baddegama South, Balapitiya, Bentota, Boossa, Beliatta,

== C ==
China Garden, Companiwatta, Companywatta

== D ==
Dabarella, Dadalla, Daganapothaha, Dalgahakele, Daluwakgoda, Daluwatumulla, Dambawatawana, Dammala, Dammanatenna, Dammantenna, Deniyaya, Dodanduwa

== E ==
Egodabedda, Egodaduwa, Egodagoda, Egodamulla, Egodawela, Ehelakanda, Ehelape, Ehelapola, Ehelepola, Ekkassa, Elagamuwa, elpitiya

== F ==
Galle Fort

== G ==
Gabadaweediya, Gabadawidiya, Gajanayakagama, Galagama, Galagammana, Galagammulla, Galahitiya, Galapilagama, Galatuduwa, Galbada, Galboda, Ginimellagaha

== H ==
Habakkala, Habaraduwa Central, Hambantota, Habaraduwa, Hakmana, Hikkaduwa, Habarakada, Habarattawila, Haburugala

== I ==
Ibbawala, Idandukita, Idantota, Ihala Aturaliya, Ihala Beligalla, Ihala Ganegama, Ihala Keembiya, Ihala Kumbukwewa, Ihala Omatta, Ihala Vitiyala, Imaduwa

== J ==
Jalampitiya, Jamburegoda, Jamburutugoda, Jandura, Jansagama, Jomahandigoda, Jorseygoda, Jorsigoda, Julampitiya, Julamulla

== K ==
Kabaragaha Ela, Kabaragala, Kabaragomaditta, Kabarayamulla, Kadaweddawa, Kadduwa, Kadedduwa, Kadigamuwa, Kadihingala, Kadiragoda, Kalahe

== L ==
Labuduwa, Lalpe, Lalwala Pahala, Lametiya, Landejulana, Lankagama, Lanumodara, Lanumodera, Lelkada, Lelwala, Lelwala Ihala, Lelwala Pahala, Lenaduwa, Lenagalpalata, Lenama, Lenewa, Lewduwa, Lintotapaya, Liyanagamakanda, Liyanagoda, Liyannakatuwa, Lolla, Lunama, Lunuganwehera

== M ==
Mabingoda, Mabotuwana, Madakumbura, Madametota, Madawala, Maddegama, Maddumagegoda, Madihe East, Madihe West, Madipola, Madipola Sinhalabage, Mirissa

== N ==
Nabadova, Nabadowa, Nadiganwela, Nagahagoda, Nagalawewa, Nagoda, Naguliadda, Nagulliyadda, Naiduwa, Nakanda, Nakandawala

== O ==
Obadagahadeniya, Obadawatta, Okandeyaya, Okawala, Okewela, Okewelagoda, Olagama, Olagama, Olaganduwa, Oligoda, Oluara, Olupeliya, Omatta, Oture, Ovilikanda, Ovilla, Ovitipana, Owilana, Owilikanda, Owilla, Owitigamuwa, Owitipana

== P ==
Padavkema, Padawkema, Paddapitiya, Paddapitiya, Padilikokmaduwa, Paduanga, Paduange, Pahajjawa, Pahala Aturaliya, Pahala Ganegama, Pahala Keembiya

== R ==
Radagoda, Radampola, Radaniara, Radaniyara, Radawela, Radompola, Rajapuragoda, Rajjamana, Rajjammana, Rallagerotawewa, Rallerotawewa, Rathgama

== S ==
Sahabandukokmaduwa, Samodagama, Sapugahayaya, Sapugoda, Sapugodawela, Saputantirikanda, Seenimodera, Sigiriya, Silvetgama, Silwatgama, Sinigama

== T ==
Talagahadiwela, Talagasgoda, Talagaspe, Talahagama, Talalla North, Talalla South, Talamporuwa, Talangalla, Talangamuwa, Talangomuwa, Talanwela, Thawalama, Thiranagama

== U ==
Uda Ambala, Uda Aparekka, Udabalgama, Udabatgama, Udaberagama, Udagangoda, Udagomadiya, Udaheragama, Udakanuketiya, Udakerawa, Udakerewa, Udugama, Unawatuna

== V ==
Valamitiyawa, Velgalla, Vidaneachchigoda, Vidaneachchilagegoda, Vidanearachchigoda, Vidanegegama, Viharahena

== W ==
Wabalakananke, Wadiya, Wadiyagoda, Waduborala, Wadumulla, Waduwadeniya, Waduweliwitiya, Wagegoda, Wagugoda, Wahala, Walgama, Weeraketiya

== Y ==
Yakkalamulla

== See also ==
- List of cities in Sri Lanka
- List of towns in Sri Lanka
