= Minuwangoda Grama Niladhari Division =

Minuwangoda
- Grama Niladhari Division
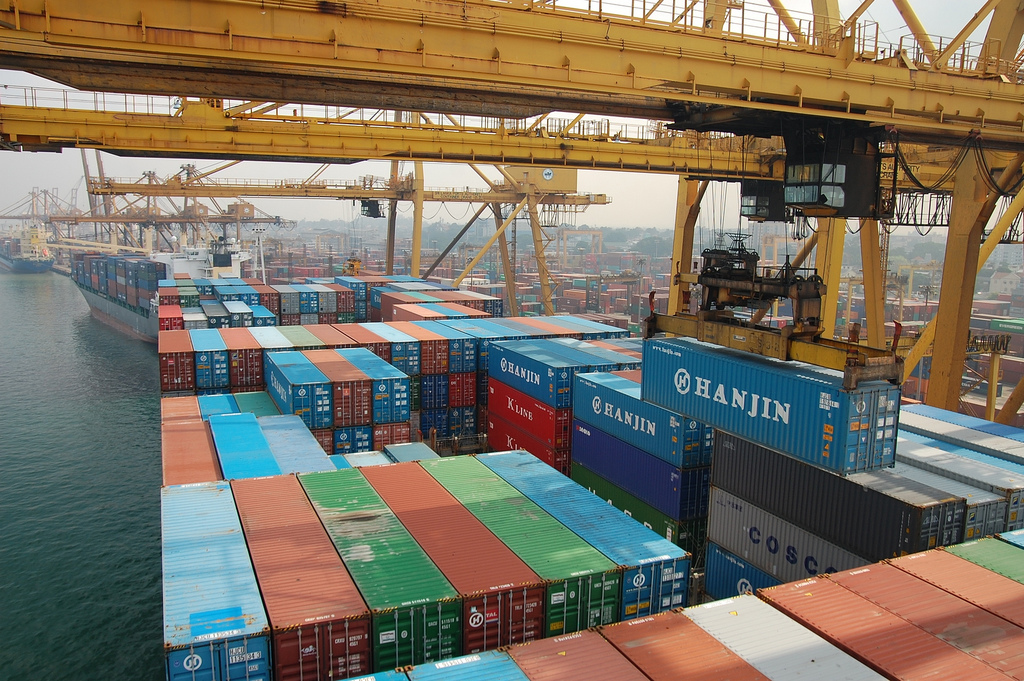
- Galle Harbour is located within, nearby or associated with the Minuwangoda Grama Niladhari Division
- Interactive map of Minuwangoda
- Coordinates: 6.038519°N 80.214488°E
- Country: Sri Lanka
- Province: Southern Province
- District: Galle District
- Divisional Secretariat: Galle Four Gravets Divisional Secretariat
- Electoral District: Galle Electoral District
- Polling Division: Galle Polling Division

Area
  - Total: 0.08 km^{2} (0.031 sq mi)
- Elevation: 181 m (594 ft)

Population (2012)
  - Total: 409
  - Density: 5,113/km^{2} (13,240/sq mi)
- ISO 3166 code: LK-3139215

Minuwangoda

Minuwangoda Grama Niladhari Division is a Grama Niladhari Division of the Galle Four Gravets Divisional Secretariat of Galle District of Southern Province, Sri Lanka. It has Grama Niladhari Division Code 96H.

Galle Harbour, St. Mary's Cathedral, Galle, Roman Catholic Diocese of Galle, St. Aloysius' College, Galle, Sacred Heart Convent Galle, China Garden and Galle International Stadium are located within, nearby or associated with Minuwangoda.

Minuwangoda is a surrounded by the Cheena Koratuwa, Kaluwella, Kandewatta and Weliwatta Grama Niladhari Divisions.

== Demographics ==
=== Ethnicity ===
The Minuwangoda Grama Niladhari Division has a Sinhalese majority (95.1%). In comparison, the Galle Four Gravets Divisional Secretariat (which contains the Minuwangoda Grama Niladhari Division) has a Sinhalese majority (66.8%) and a significant Moor population (32.1%)

Ethnicity in Minuwangoda
1. Sinhalese (95.1%)
2. Moor (4.20%)
3. Other (0.70%)

=== Religion ===
The Minuwangoda Grama Niladhari Division has a Buddhist majority (94.1%). In comparison, the Galle Four Gravets Divisional Secretariat (which contains the Minuwangoda Grama Niladhari Division) has a Buddhist majority (65.7%) and a significant Muslim population (32.3%)

Religion in Minuwangoda
1. Buddhist (94.1%)
2. Muslim (4.40%)
3. Other (1.50%)

== Gallery ==
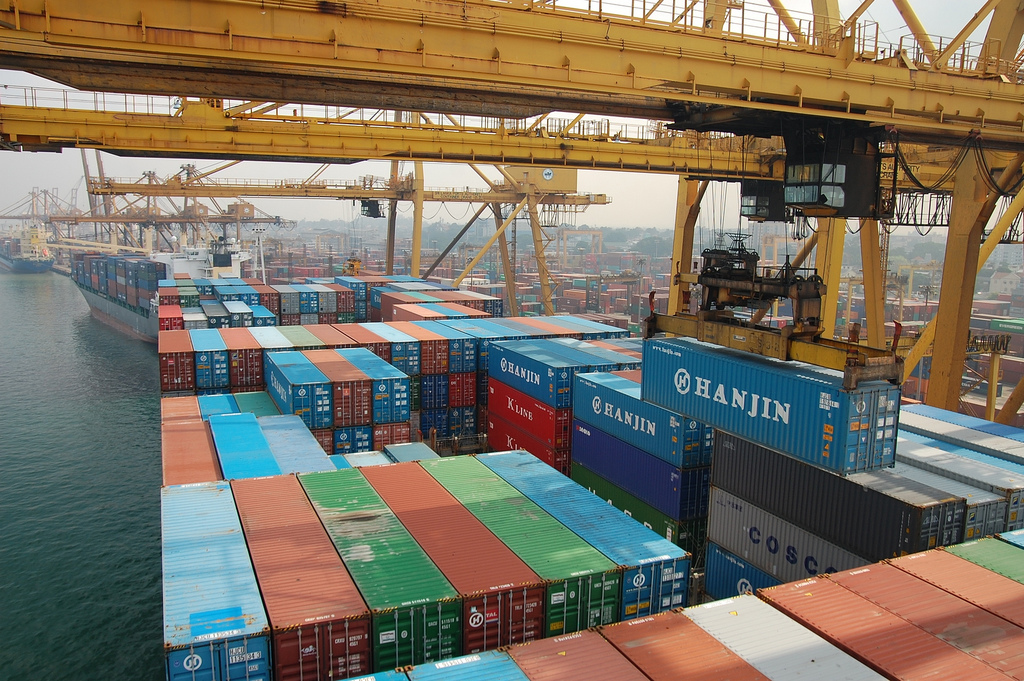
Galle Harbour

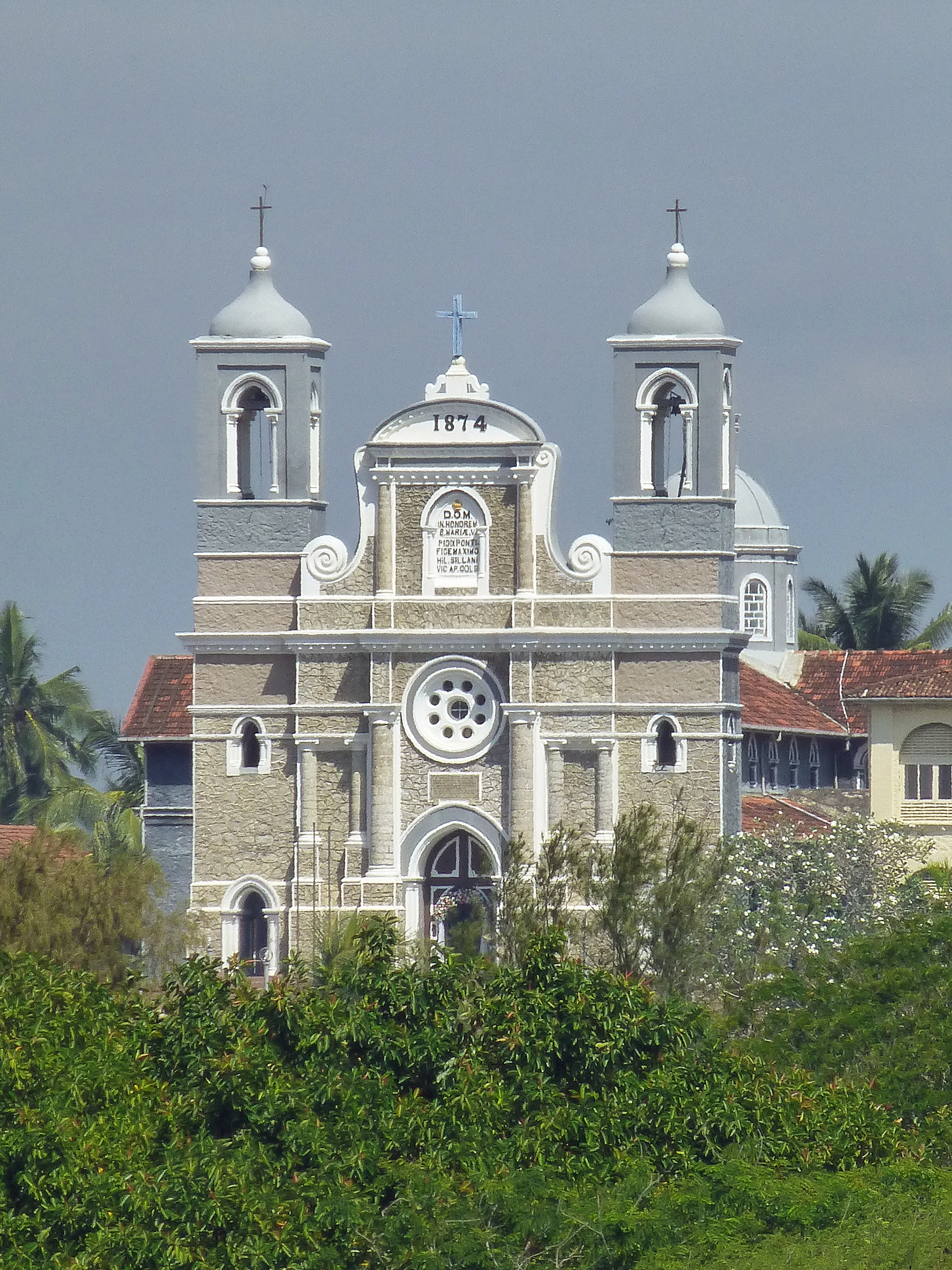
St. Mary's Cathedral, Galle

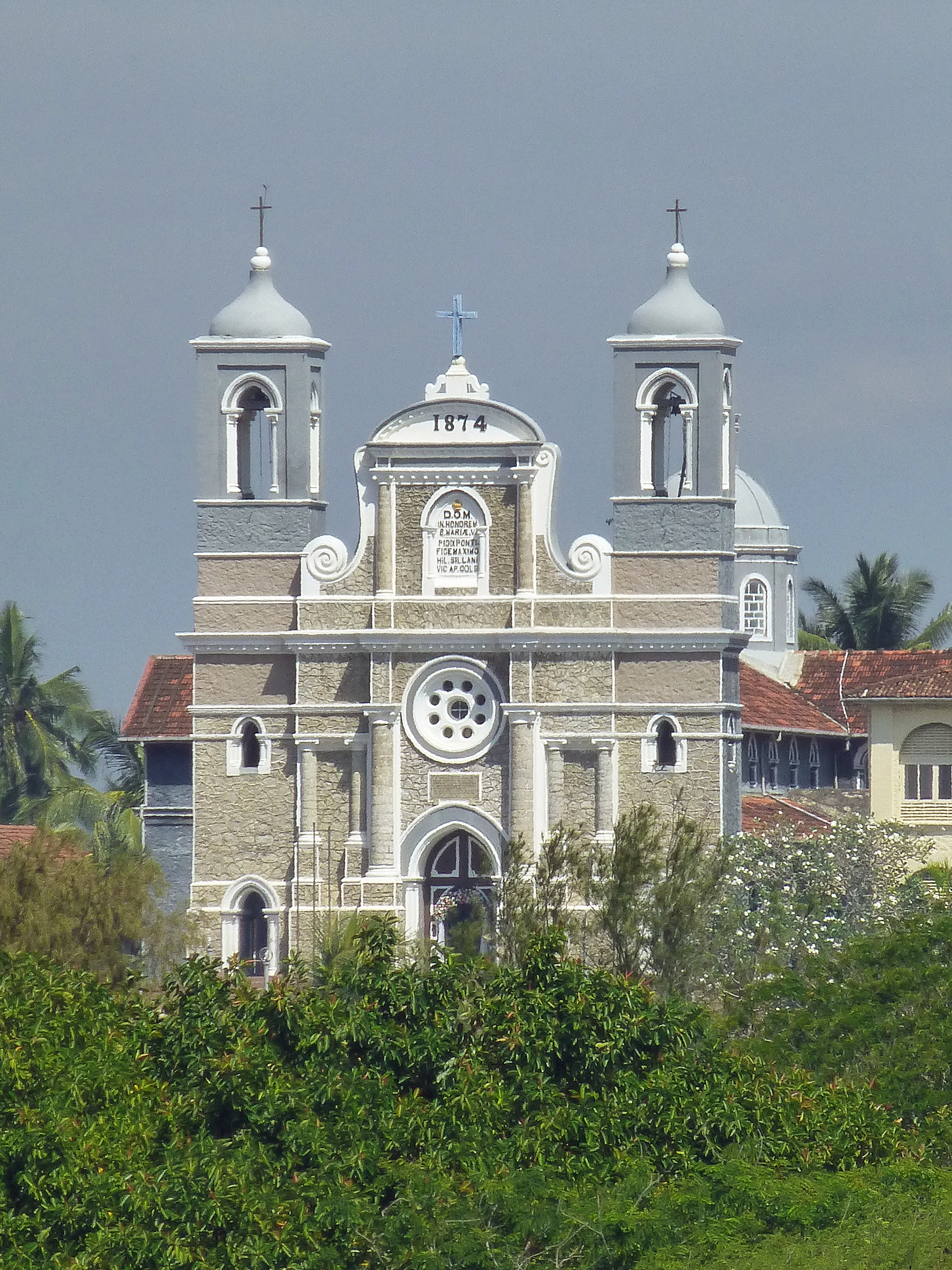
Roman Catholic Diocese of Galle

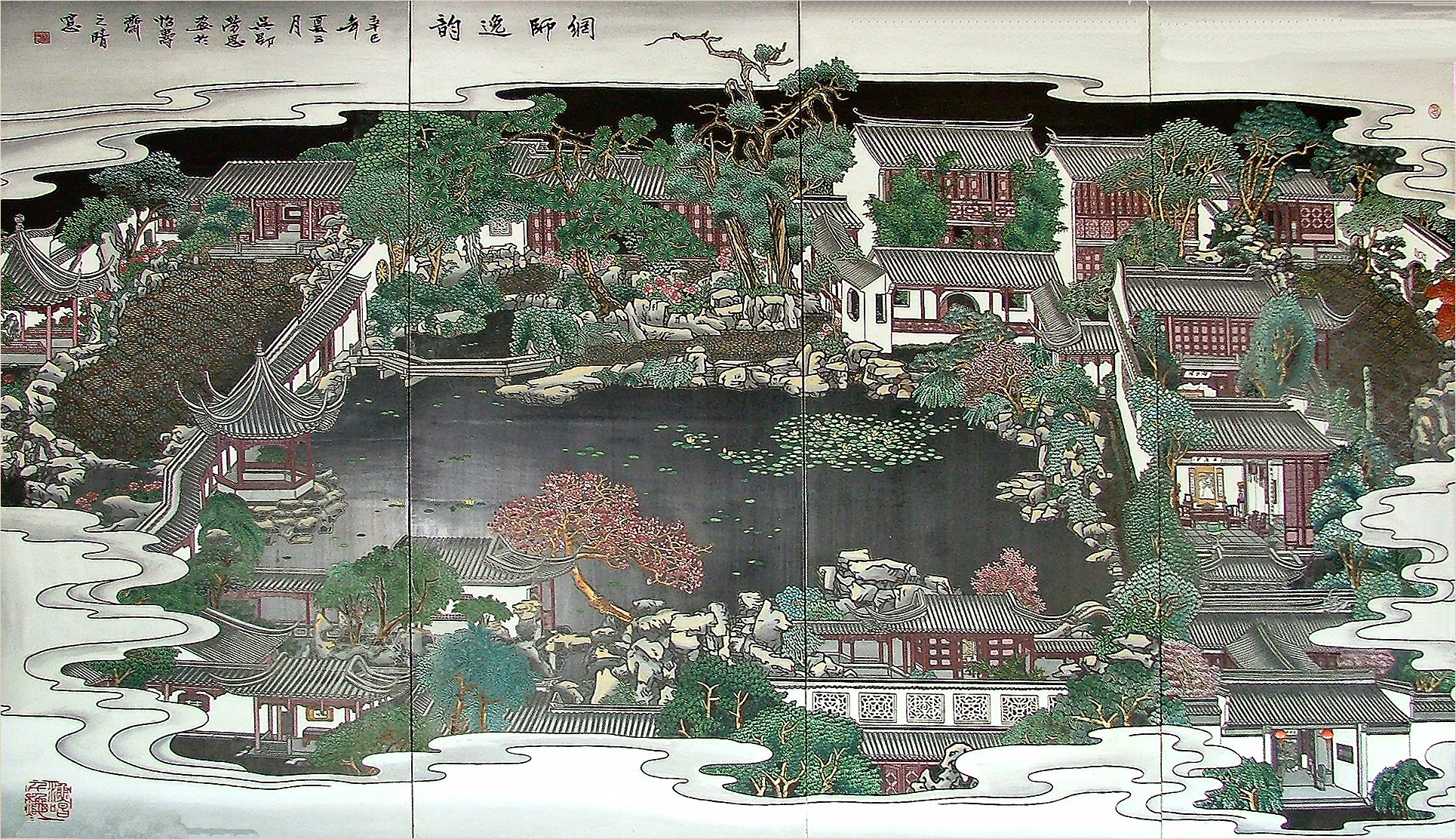
China Garden

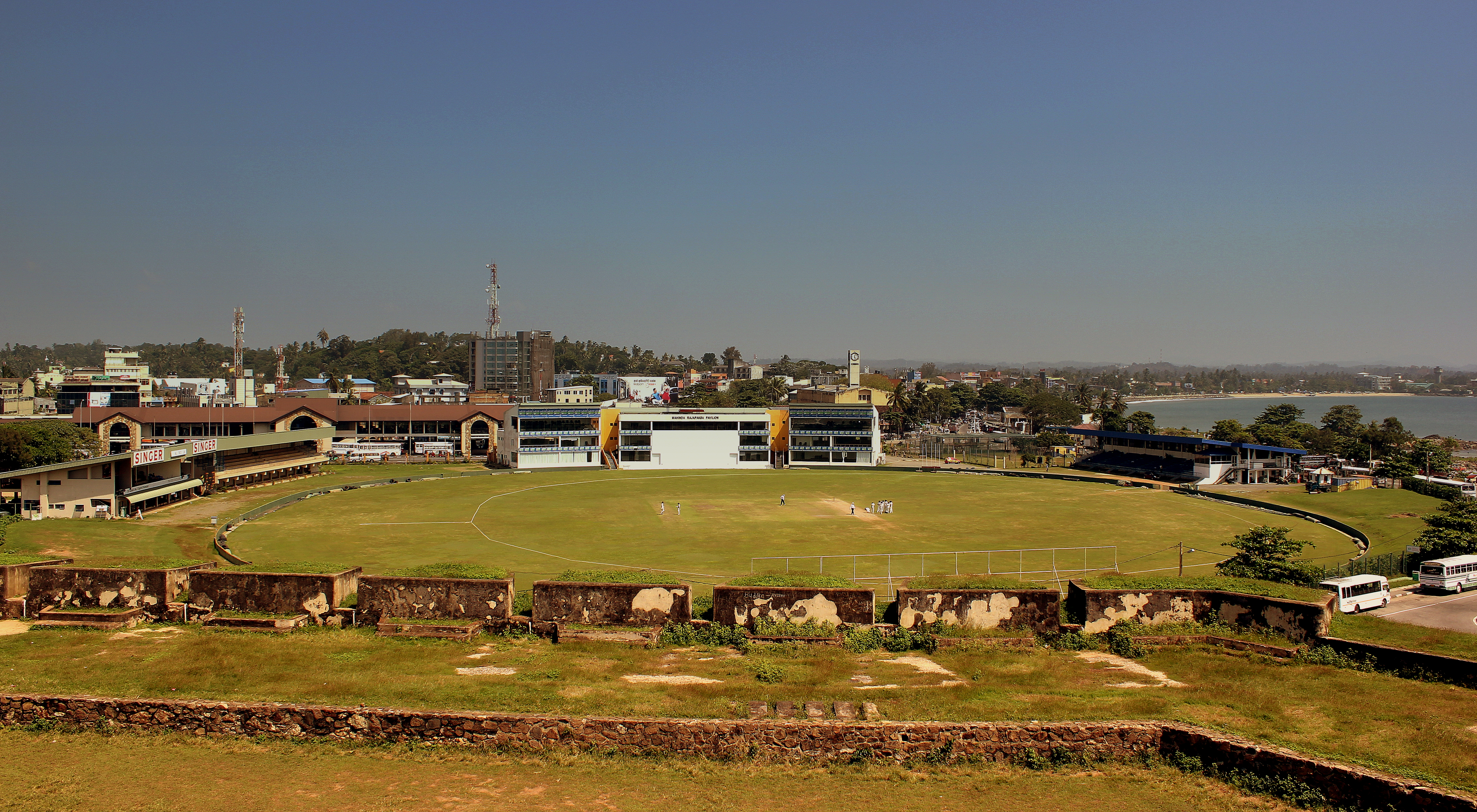
Galle International Stadium
