= Choola Bodhi Viharaya =

Buddhist temple in Southern Province, Sri Lanka

- Interactive map of the Choola Bodhi Viharaya area

General information
- Location: Haburugala
- Coordinates: 29.9053276°N 89.9788121°W

Choola Bodhi Viharaya is a Theravada Buddhist temple in Haburugala, Bentota, of the Southern Province of Sri Lanka. It is located on top of a mountain and consists of major components in a Buddhist Temple including Stupa, Bodhi Tree, Buddha statue, Dharmashala (open hall for preaching and gathering) etc. The literal meaning of Choola Bodhi is that a small Bodhi Tree. The temple holds the weekly Sunday Buddhist school with the help of many young and old educated Buddhists to teach the students of the village. The name of the Sunday Buddhist School is Sri Punyarathana Dhamma School.
