= Ridi Bendi Ela Irrigation Scheme =

Irrigation scheme in Sri Lanka

Ridi Bendi Ela is a major irrigation scheme in North Western Province, Sri Lanka. It is located within the Nikaweretiya Divisional Secretary division in the Kurunagala district, a major part of which is in the Deduru Oya river basin. The main reservoir of the irrigation scheme is the Magalle Wewa which is located in Nikawaratiya.

The reservoir has a total capacity of 9.2 million cubic metres (7,480 acre-feet) and a depth at the spilling level of 5.5 metres (17 ft 11 in). The total length of the tank bund is 1,665 metres (5,463 ft). The 23 km long Ridi Bendi Ela feeder canal provides nearly 80% of annual water inflow.

== History ==
The original irrigation reservoir and feeder canal from Daduru Oya were constructed by King Mahasena. The most remarkable era in the history of Sri Lankan irrigation is King Parakkramabahu’s Reign (1153-1186 A.D.)

== Project area ==
The project area is divided into 11 farmer organisations:

- Katagamuwa
- Magallegama
- Ibbawala
- Mada Ela
- Balagollagama
- Budumuththawa
- Kabellawa
- Heelogama
- Diullawa
- Danduwa
- Tharanagolla
