= Ihagama Unnanse =

Ihagama Rathanapala Thero, known as Ihagama Unnanse was a Buddhist monk who was an important character in the independence struggles against the British in Sri Lanka. Although overshadowed by characters like Keppetipola and Madugalle, he was one of the pioneers in the independence struggle that began in 1816.

== Early life ==
Ihagama Rathanapala thero was born in the village of Ihagama of Harispattuwa in 1793 and was a monk in Malwatte temple when the British colonised the country. He had been a teacher to John D’Oyly, who was instrumental in identifying him after the collapse of the 1818 independence struggle. He was the witness to the last will of Ehelepola written in Mauritius. Accordingly, his lay name is Babasa. People of the village of Ihagama remember the hero "Babasa" as one of their clansman.

== Role in independence struggle ==
Ceylon was ceded to the British in 1815. However resentment was brewing among the Sinhalese. The earliest attempt to evict them was led by Ihagama Unnanse, whose intention was to enthrone a Siamese prince. The plot was revealed by Ekneligoda and Ihagama Unnanse was arrested with two other monks. He escaped and lived in secrecy until the great rebellion began. Under Duraisamy the newly enthroned King, he became a "Disawe" and was the rebellion's guiding force. The British suppressed the rebellion in 1818. He was caught and initially sentenced to death, but was later exiled to British Mauritius. He was freed in 1832 and returned to Ceylon. He took part in the abortive 1834 conspiracy which was aimed at expelling the British with the aid of France and again exiled to British Mauritius. He was again released and died in Sri Lanka.
