= Thirumeninathar temple =

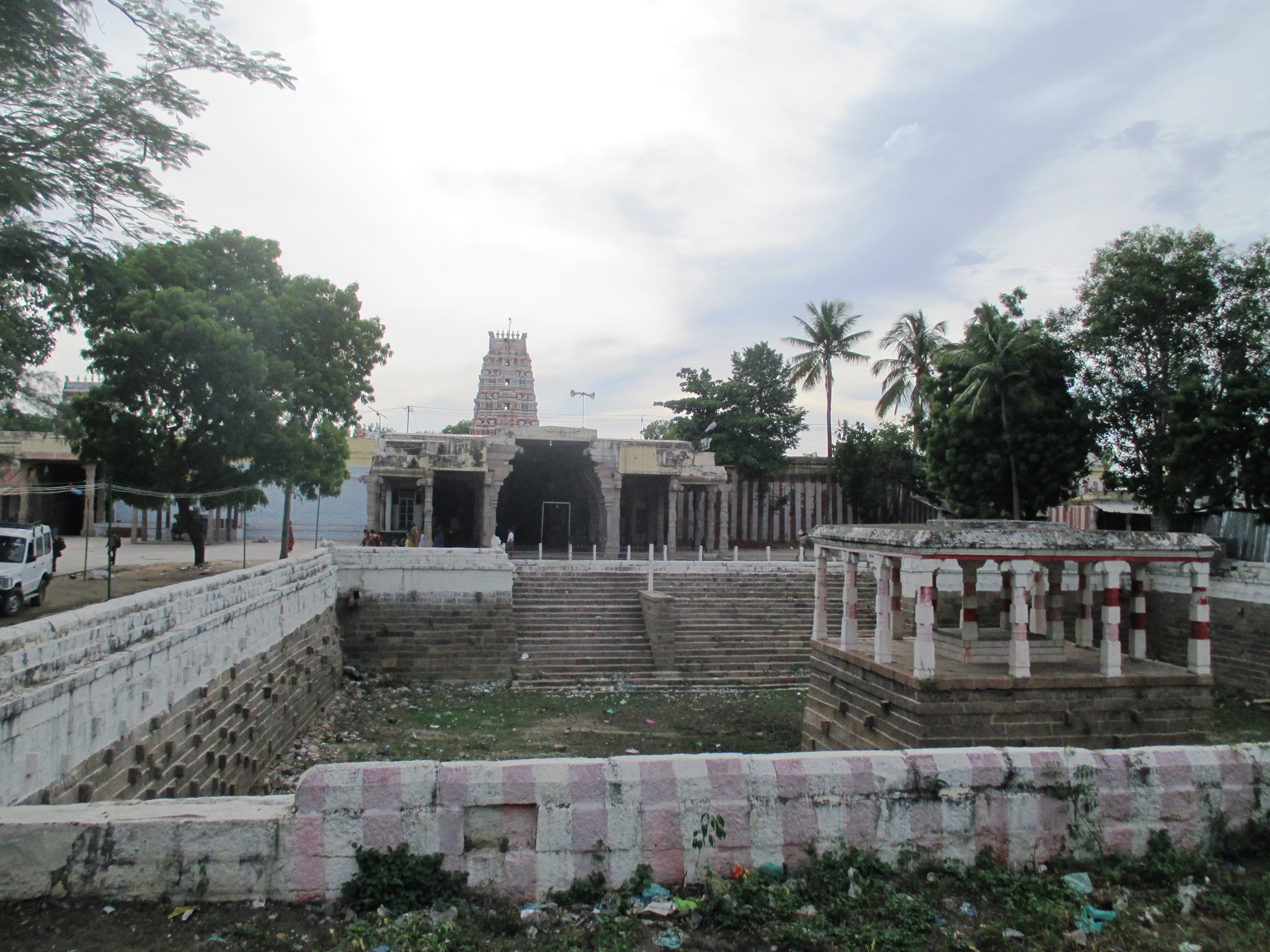

- Location in Tamil Nadu

Religion
- Affiliation: Hinduism
- District: Virudhunagar
- Deity: Bhoominathar (Shiva) Thirumeninathar (Shiva)

Location
- Location: Thiruchuli, Tamil Nadu, India
- State: Tamil Nadu
- Country: India
- Coordinates: 9.7°N 78.483°E

Architecture
- Type: Dravidian architecture

Thirumeninathar temple (also called Boominathar temple or Tiruchuli temple) is a Hindu temple dedicated to the deity Shiva, located in Tiruchuli in Virudhunagar district, in the South Indian state of Tamil Nadu. Shiva is worshipped as Thirumeninathar, and is represented by the lingam. His consort Parvati is depicted as Thunaimalaiyammai Amman. The temple is located on the Virudhunagar–Manamadurai road. The presiding deity is revered in the 7th-century-CE Tamil Saiva canonical work, the Tevaram, written by Tamil saint poets known as the nayanmars and classified as Paadal Petra Sthalam. The temple is closely associated with Sundarar, who has sung praises about the presiding deity. This shrine is regarded as the 12th of the Tevara Stalams in the Pandya region of Tamil Nadu.

The presiding deity is believed to have been worshipped by Vishnu, Indra, Brahma, Sun, Bhoomidevi, sage Gowthama, Agaliga, Kanva, Arjuna, Chitrangadai and Cheraman Perumal. Tiruchli is the birthplace of Ramana Maharishi, a prominent Saivite saint.

== Architecture ==
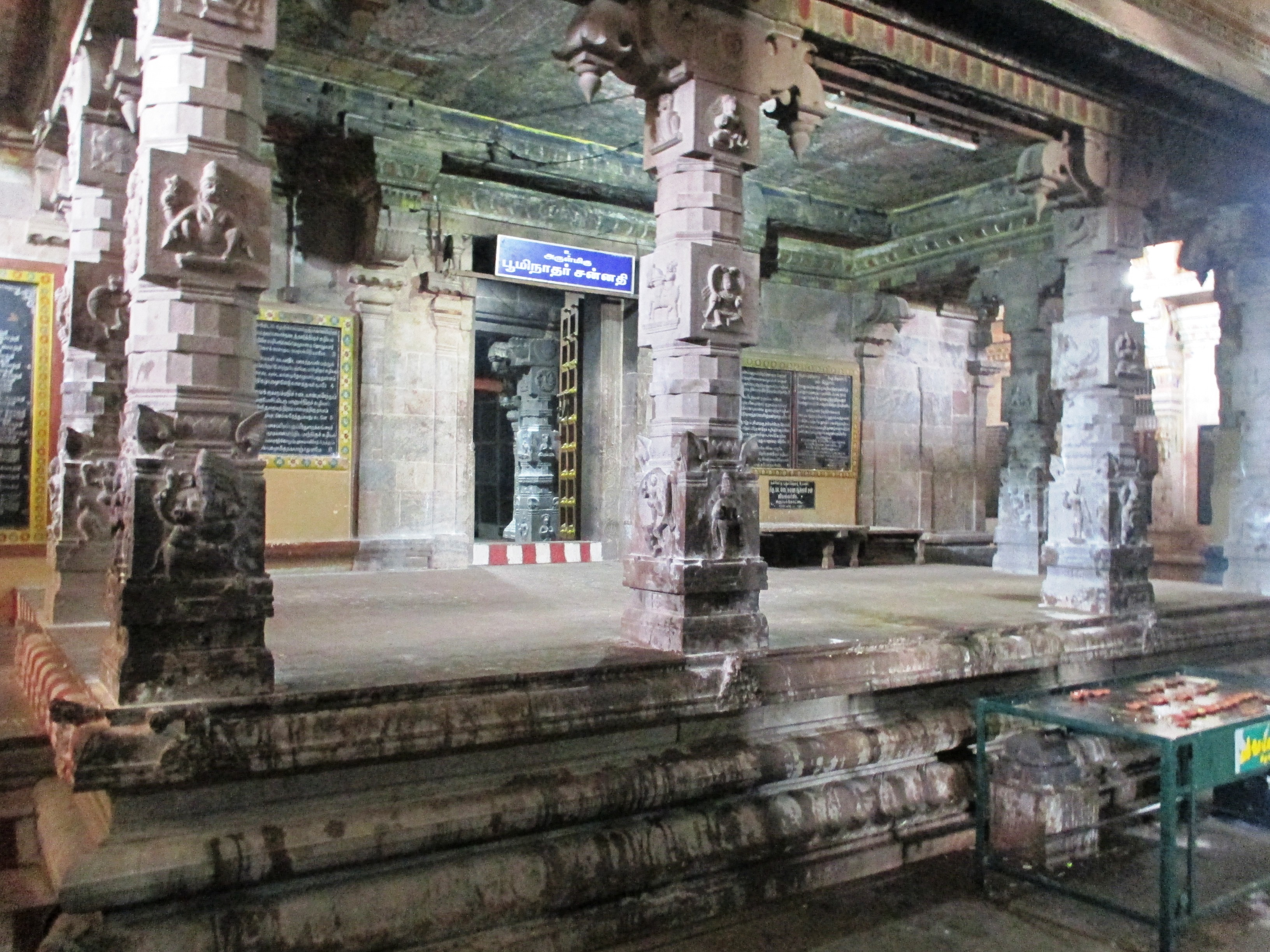
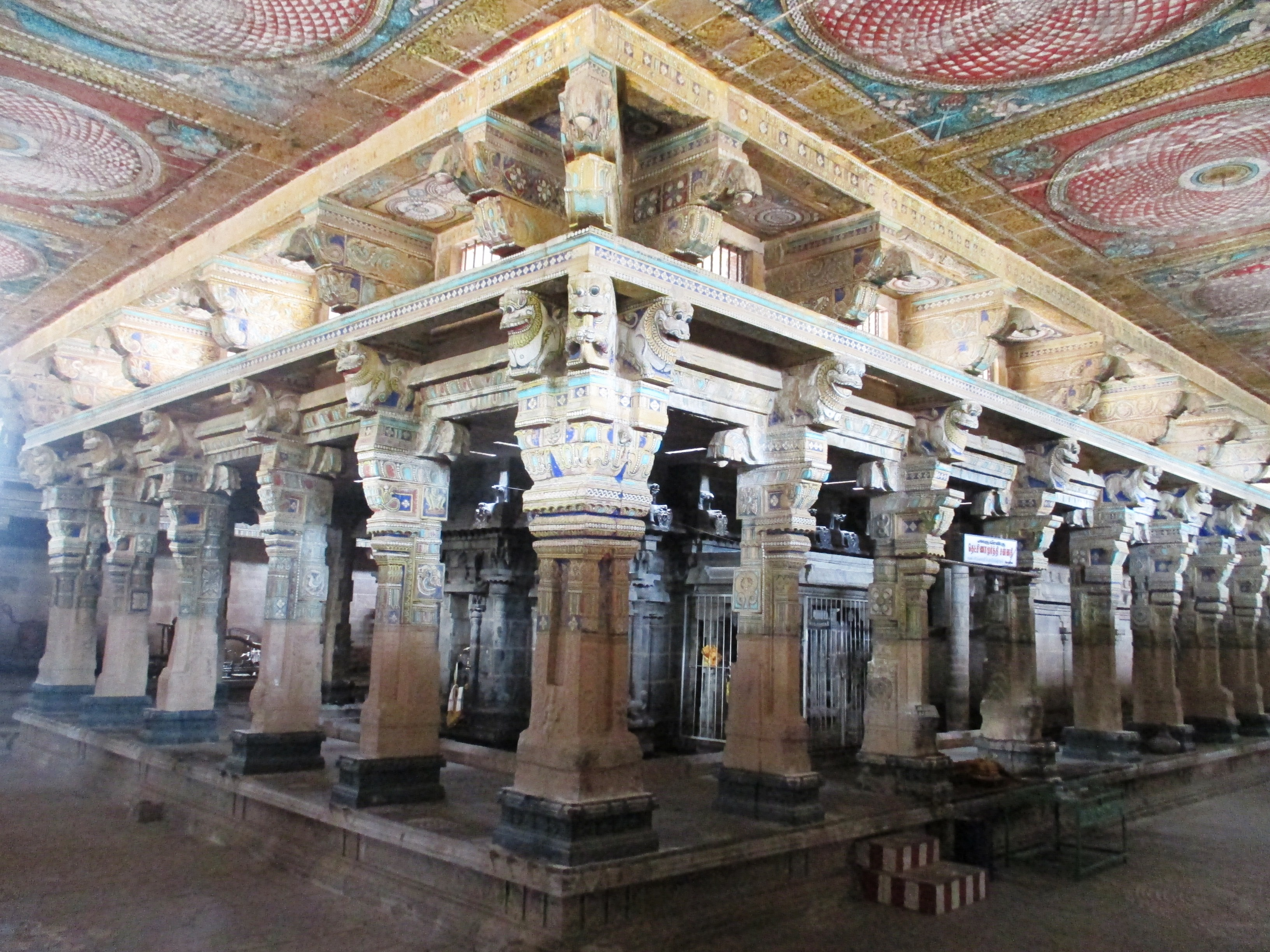
Pillared halls of the temple

This temple is located 55 km from Madurai. The nearest town Aruppukottai is about 15 km away from this temple. The temple spans an area of about 45,000 square feet (4,200 m^{2}). There are several shrines and waterbodies within this temple complex and around it. The Shiva and Ambal shrines both face the East. The presiding deity Shiva is called Tirumeni Nathar, Bhoominathar and his consort Parvathy is called as Tunaimaalainayaki. The presiding deity Thirueninathar is housed in the sanctum that has a moat surrounding it. The image of Thirumeninathar is in the form of a square-shaped Linga. of The Kauvaikkadal tank with a central mandapam is located axial to the sanctum and outside the entrance tower. There are shrines of Pralaya Vitankar and the Palani Andavar in this temple. The sthala vriksham (temple tree) is Punnai tree and the Theertham is Kauvaikkadal tank. The temple is approached via Kudavarai entrance and the Kambathadi hall is located near the entrance. The Sabha hall houses the image of Nataraja. The hall also houses the image of sage Gowthama and Akalika. The Ambal shrine also faces East and has a separate parallel entrance. The hall opposite to the sanctum of Ambal has a Srichakra in the ceiling.

Architecturally, the temple is considered similar to that of Madurai Meenakshi Amman temple and Rameswaram temple. The Ramanathapuram rulers have traditionally maintained this temple. In modern times, the temple is maintained and administered by the Hindu Religious and Charitable Endowments Department of the Government of Tamil Nadu.
