= Radaniara =

Coordinates: 6°12′N 80°41′E

- Interactive map of Radaniara
- Country: Sri Lanka
- Province: Southern Province
- Time zone: UTC+5:30 (Sri Lanka Standard Time)

Radaniara is a village in Sri Lanka. It is located within Southern Province. It is situated in Mulkirigalala electorate and the nearest town is Walasmulla. It is a village having 200 families. A road to the village runs through to Namaneliya.

== Geography ==
Plat lands and the northern side of Mapitakanda rainforest and the southern side has mixed crops, coconut, paddy fields, and cinnamon.

== Economy ==
Many people are manual laborers. a quarter of families belongs to many lands of the village. During the rainy season many men and women engage in paddy fields. Many men work in the capital and return home on weekends or at the end of the month.

== Education and educated people ==
H/radaniaara maha Vidyalaya is situated in the center of the village and was established around 1950. Many elderly people are old mates from school. It holds from grades one to thirteen. Secondary education is available in the Art stream and those who want to seek Bioscience, Mathematics or commerce fields go to nearby cities Walasmulla or Weeraketiya. Kankanam palliyage saman allied with Sinha Saman Kumara is the leading politician who got selected as a member of the southern provincial council by the UPFA government. Dr. Patabendige Chaminda is the first MBBS-graduated doctor who got primary education from school and Dr. Prabash Karunanayake is the first MBBS-graduated doctor who was born in the village.

== Ancestry ==
One-third of the lands belonged to the Ihalahawatta family in 1900. Two landlords were Mr. Kankanam Palliyage Samiappu and Mr. Karunanayake [loku ralahamy]. Many dependents of the Samiappu family live scattered in the village. Several new families emerged in 2000 and afterward. Lands for the school were donated by Mr. Lokuralahamy's family and the main Buddhist temple of the village, Sri Sudarmaramaya, land was donated by Mr. Samiappu and his wife Mrs. Jasinhe Lokuhamy. Many lands were taken into government control by the Sirimavo Bandaranayake government and many were distributed among villagers in later periods. Many belong to the Halagama caste and few Govigama families. Namaneliya and Buwellagoda are nearby villages in the castes of Olee and Hinna respectively and they consider low castes. Many villagers consider as an insult to family and village if one marries a lower caste.

== See also ==
- List of settlements in Southern Province, Sri Lanka
