= Wahala =

Coordinates: 6°03′N 80°25′E

Wahala Kananke Kananke Wasala kanaga
- Interactive map of Wahala Kananke
- Country: Sri Lanka
- Province: Southern Province
- Time zone: UTC+5:30 (Sri Lanka Standard Time)

Wahala is a small town in Sri Lanka. It is located within Southern Province.

== See also ==
- List of towns in Southern Province, Sri Lanka
