= Lankagama =

Coordinates: 6°21′N 80°28′E

- Interactive map of Lankagama
- Country: Sri Lanka
- Province: Southern Province
- Time zone: UTC+5:30 (Sri Lanka Standard Time)

Lankagama is a small town in Sri Lanka. It is located within Southern Province.

It basically included four villages Pitadeniya, Kolonthotuwa, Wathugala, and Lankagama. With a population of 981 (2025).

== See also ==
- List of towns in Southern Province, Sri Lanka
