= Wadiya =

- Location within Sri Lanka
- Coordinates: 6°5′30.026″N 80°45′38.227″E
- Country: Sri Lanka
- Province: Southern Province
- Time zone: UTC+5:30 (Sri Lanka Standard Time)

Wadiya is a small town in Sri Lanka. It is located within Southern Province.

== See also ==
- List of towns in Southern Province, Sri Lanka
