= Gajanayakagama =

Coordinates: 6°11′N 80°49′E

- Interactive map of Gajanayakagama
- Country: Sri Lanka
- Province: Southern Province
- Time zone: UTC+5:30 (Sri Lanka Standard Time)

Gajanayakagama is a small town in Sri Lanka. It is located within Southern Province.

== See also ==
- List of towns in Southern Province, Sri Lanka
