= Liyanagoda =

Town in the Southern Province, Sri Lanka

Coordinates: 6°00′N 80°18′E

- Interactive map of Liyanagoda
- Country: Sri Lanka
- Province: Southern Province Liyanogoda also has many paddyfields and also a jungle.
- Time zone: UTC+5:30 (Sri Lanka Standard Time)

Liyanagoda is a small town in Sri Lanka. It is located within the Southern Province of Sri Lanka, in the suburb of Pannipitiya.

== See also ==
- List of towns in Southern Province, Sri Lanka
