= Sapugodawela =

Coordinates: 6°04′N 80°41′E

- Village
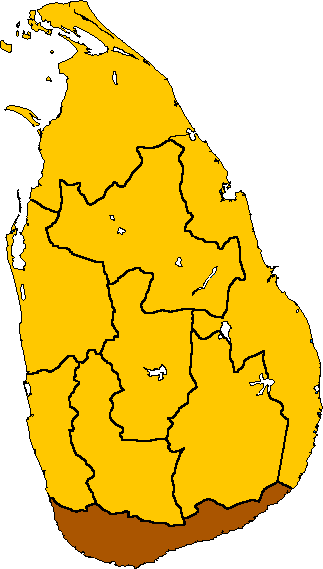
- Southern Province of Sri Lanka
- Country: Sri Lanka
- Province: Southern Province
- District: Matara District
- Time zone: UTC+5:30 (Sri Lanka Standard Time)

Sapugodawela is a village in Sri Lanka. It is located within Southern Province. It is 52km away from the provincial capital of the southern district Galle and 133km away from Sri Lanka's capital Colombo.

== See also ==
- List of towns in Southern Province, Sri Lanka
