= Vidanearachchigoda =

Coordinates: 6°04′N 80°47′E

- Interactive map of Vidanearachchigoda
- Country: Sri Lanka
- Province: Southern Province
- Time zone: UTC+5:30 (Sri Lanka Standard Time)

Vidanearachchigoda is a small town in Sri Lanka. It is located within Southern Province.

== See also ==
- List of towns in Southern Province, Sri Lanka
