= Habarakada =

Habarakada හබරකඩ ஹபர்கடா
- Country: Sri Lanka
- Province: Western Province, Sri Lanka
- Time zone: UTC+5:30 (Sri Lanka Standard Time)

Habarakada is a large suburb of Homagama, in the Western Province, Sri Lanka. It is situated near the E2 Expressway Athurugiriya Interchange (3 km), approximately 20 km away from the centre of Colombo. Industrial machines, factories, military base. Traditional and ayurvedic medical centers (instantly - Habarakada wedagedara) and leisure destinations are some of the industries established there.

== See also ==
- List of towns in Southern Province, Sri Lanka
- Another village with same name Habarakada is in the Homagama electorate, Colombo District, Western province, Sri Lanka
- There is a village called Habarakada in Homagama in the Colombo District.

https://www.google.lk/maps/place/Habarakada/@6.8653287,80.0090396,16z/data=!3m1!4b1!4m5!3m4!1s0x3ae253d6bb34dbdf:0x8ee0bdae6c6fc328!8m2!3d6.8659652!4d80.0129664
