= Rajjamana =

Coordinates: 7°37′N 80°40′E

- Interactive map of Rajjamana
- Country: Sri Lanka
- Province: Southern Province
- Time zone: UTC+5:30 (Sri Lanka Standard Time)

Rajjamana is a small town in Sri Lanka. It is located within Southern Province.

== See also ==
- List of towns in Southern Province, Sri Lanka
