= Dadalla, Galle =

Dadalla
- Ward
- Location within Sri Lanka
- Coordinates: 6°03′N 80°12′E
- Country: Sri Lanka
- Province: Southern Province
- District: Galle District
- City: Galle
- Time zone: UTC+5:30 (Sri Lanka Standard Time)

Dadalla is one of fifteen wards (Ward No. 12) that comprise the city of Galle, Sri Lanka.

It is made up of five Grama Niladharis: Gintota West; Gintota East; Dadella West; Dadella East and Walawwatte/Siyambalagahawatte.

It contains the Dadalla cemetery

== See also ==
- Galle
- List of towns in Southern Province, Sri Lanka
