= Nagulliyadda =

Coordinates: 7°34′N 80°40′E

- Interactive map of Nagulliyadda
- Country: Sri Lanka
- Province: Southern Province
- Time zone: UTC+5:30 (Sri Lanka Standard Time)

Nagulliyadda is a small town in Sri Lanka. It is located within Southern Province.

== See also ==
- List of towns in Southern Province, Sri Lanka
