= Radompola =

Town in Southern Province, Sri Lanka

- Location of Radompola in Sri Lanka
- Coordinates: 6°00′N 80°40′E
- Country: Sri Lanka
- Province: Southern Province
- Time zone: UTC+5:30 (Sri Lanka Standard Time)

Radompola is a small town in Sri Lanka. It is located within Southern Province.

== See also ==
- List of towns in Southern Province, Sri Lanka
