= Seenimodera =

Coordinates: 6°00′N 80°45′E

- Interactive map of Seenimodera
- Country: Sri Lanka
- Province: Southern Province
- Time zone: UTC+5:30 (Sri Lanka Standard Time)

Seenimodera is a small town in Sri Lanka. It is located within Southern Province.

== See also ==
- List of towns in Southern Province, Sri Lanka
