= Valamitiyawa =

Coordinates: 7°46′N 80°37′E

- Interactive map of Valamitiyawa
- Country: Sri Lanka
- Province: Southern Province
- Time zone: UTC+5:30 (Sri Lanka Standard Time)

Valamitiyawa is a small town in Southern Province, Sri Lanka, Sri Lanka.

== See also ==
- List of towns in Southern Province, Sri Lanka
