= Babarenda South I =

Coordinates: 5°58′N 80°39′E

- Interactive map of Babarenda South I
- Country: Sri Lanka
- Province: Southern Province
- Time zone: UTC+5:30 (Sri Lanka Standard Time)

Babarenda South I is a small town in Sri Lanka. It is located within Southern Province, which is one of the smallest of the nine provinces but one of the most populated.

== See also ==
- List of towns in Southern Province, Sri Lanka
