= Sri Punyarathana Dhamma School =

Buddhist school in Sri Lanka

Sri Punyarathana Dhamma School at Choola Bodhi Viharaya is a free education Buddhist religious center for children under the age of 18 years. It is situated in the village Haburugala in the Southern part of Sri Lanka. The purpose of the school is to guide students from Haburugala and nearby villages to understand, practice, and analyze Theravada Buddhist principals (dharma). The school intends to produce non-violent, peaceful, well-mannered students with their ambitions to become useful people to the world. The school is maintained by the Choola Bodhi Viharaya temple in Haburugala, Bentota which is an agricultural village. The chief monk Uhan Owita Sumanasiri is the principal of the free Buddhist school since its establishment in 1987.

== Charity work ==
The teachers in Sri Punyarathana Dhamma School, Haburugala don't take any payment for their service as they consider it to be a service to society and charity work. The Buddhist concept of karma encourages the students to become teachers who sacrifice their valuable time for the next generation students.

In 2008, a girl won the Island-wide Competition for the Final Grade competition in "Dhaham Denuma" (knowledge on Buddhism). The students have won several awards in the Bentota regional competitions resulting in the first place for six consecutive years from 2004 to 2009.

== Staff members and education ==
The staff consists of eighteen teachers, seven of them are holding bachelor's degree holders in various fields such as Computer Science, Arts, Languages, or Buddhism. The principal was a teacher and the former principal of Miriswatta Maha Vidyalaya government school in Miriswatta, Bentota before his retirement in 1998. He had obtained his Bachelor of Arts degree from the University of Kelaniya. The assistant principal Uhan Owita Nagitha finished his Bachelor of Arts degree in 2008.

== Problems ==
Due to the educational standards of the Dhamma school and the discipline constructed with well-understanding of the morals, the number of students who enter the Dhamma school increases every year. The temple rarely gets a funding from the government resulting in a drop of facilities for the students. Since income of the families in the area is not equally distributed, the school takes no fee from the students. Classes are held in an outdoor environment which pleases the students because of the natural surroundings, but the classes have to be stopped whenever there is rain. Furthermore, the number of students are higher than the number of chairs and desks available. The available building facilities is not enough for the students. There are knowledgeable people with educational qualifications to teach Computer Science, Information Technology, even though there is neither a computer nor the required facilities.

Due to high competition for available seats in Universities, students from grade 11 tend to leave the Dhamma school to participate in tuition classes required for the school curriculum. When it comes to grade 12, students tend to omit the final examination resulting a waste of 11 years of Dhamma education. The competition to enter the universities can cause students anxiety and fear. Many of the Dhamma school teachers consider this to be a social problem.
