= Naiduwa =

Coordinates: 6°06′N 80°10′E

- Interactive map of Naiduwa
- Country: Sri Lanka
- Province: Southern Province
- Time zone: UTC+5:30 (Sri Lanka Standard Time)

Naiduwa is a small town in Sri Lanka. It is located within Southern Province. Its geographical coordinates are 6° 6' 0" North, 80° 10' 0" East.

== Airports ==
- Katukurunda Airport (approximately 18 km (11 mi))
- Koggala Airport (approximately 23 km (14 mi))
- Bentota River Airport (approximately 40 km (25 mi))
- Ratmalana Airport (approximately 86 km (53 mi))
- Kelani River-Peliyagoda Waterdrome (approximately 94 km (58 mi))

== See also ==
- List of towns in Southern Province, Sri Lanka
