= Daluwakgoda =

- Location in Sri Lanka
- Coordinates: 6°07′54″N 80°41′45″E
- Country: Sri Lanka
- Province: Southern Province
- Time zone: UTC+5:30 (Sri Lanka Standard Time)

Daluwakgoda is a small town in Sri Lanka. It is located within Southern Province.

== See also ==
- List of towns in Southern Province, Sri Lanka
