= Galagama =

- Town
- Location within Sri Lanka
- Coordinates: 5°56′49″N 80°49′29″E
- Country: Sri Lanka
- Province: Southern Province
- Elevation: 43 m (141 ft)
- Time zone: UTC+5:30 (Sri Lanka Standard Time Zone)
  - Summer (DST): UTC+6 (Summer time)

Galagama is a small town in Sri Lanka. It is located within Southern Province.

== See also ==
- List of towns in Southern Province, Sri Lanka
