= Dabarella =

Coordinates: 6°15′N 80°50′E

- Interactive map of Dabarella
- Country: Sri Lanka
- Province: Southern Province
- Time zone: UTC+5:30 (Sri Lanka Standard Time)

Dabarella is a small town in Sri Lanka. It is located within Southern Province. The peak temperature on October 30, 2013 was 32 °C.

== See also ==
- List of towns in Southern Province, Sri Lanka
