= Lunugamwehera =

Coordinates: 6°20′N 81°12′E

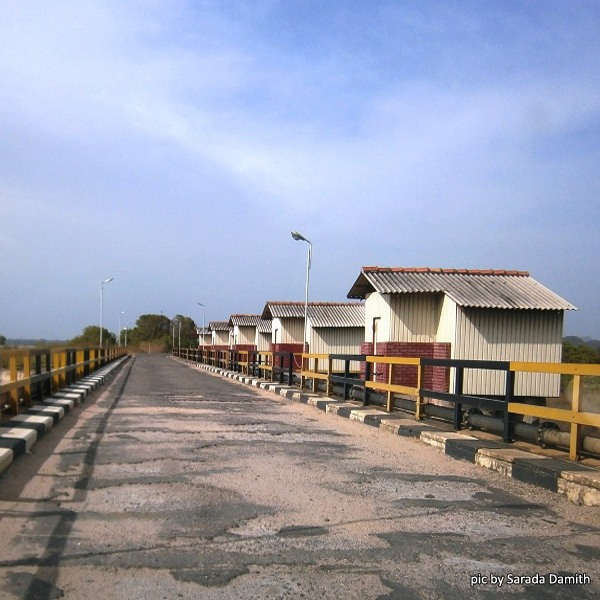
- Lunugamwehera Dam
- Interactive map of Lunugamwehera
- Country: Sri Lanka
- Province: Southern Province
- Time zone: UTC+5:30 (Sri Lanka Standard Time)

Lunugamwehera is a small town in Sri Lanka. It is located within Southern Province.

== See also ==
- List of towns in Southern Province, Sri Lanka
