= Madipola Sinhalabage =

Coordinates: 7°41′N 80°35′E

- Interactive map of Madipola Sinhalabage
- Country: Sri Lanka
- Province: Southern Province
- Time zone: UTC+5:30 (Sri Lanka Standard Time)

Madipola Sinhalabage is a small town in Sri Lanka. It is located within Southern Province.

Its exact location is 7° 40' 59" N, 80° 34' 59" E. It contains at least 4 people.

== See also ==
- List of towns in Southern Province, Sri Lanka
