= Udakerewa =

- Town
- Location within Sri Lanka
- Coordinates: 6°12′N 80°05′E
- Country: Sri Lanka
- Province: Southern Province
- Time zone: UTC+5:30 (Sri Lanka Standard Time)

Udakerewa is a small town in Sri Lanka. It is located within Southern Province.

== See also ==
- List of towns in Southern Province, Sri Lanka
