= Ihagama =

Coordinates: 7°22′N 80°34′E

- Village
- Interactive map of Ihagama
- Country: Sri Lanka
- Province: Central Province
- Time zone: UTC+5:30 (Sri Lanka Standard Time)

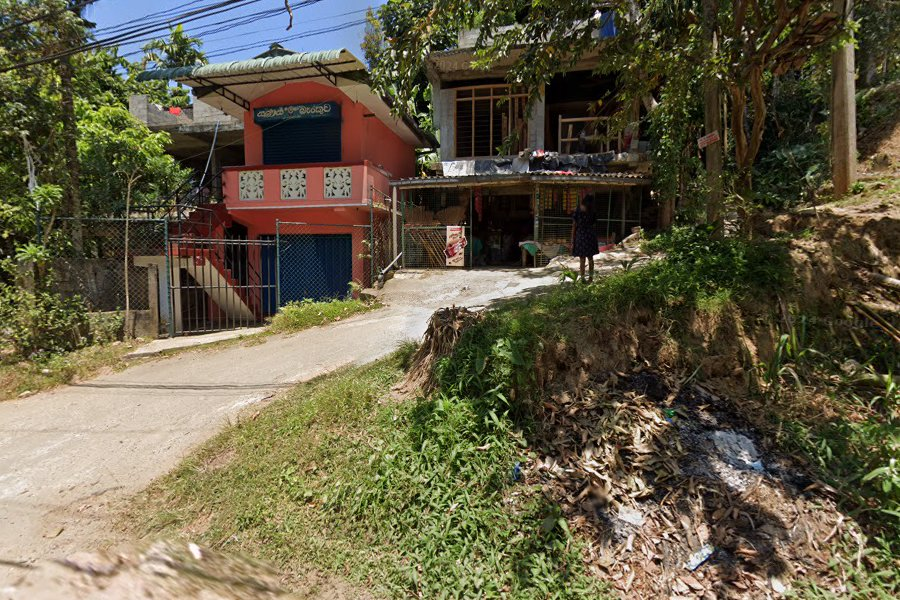

Ihagama is a village in Sri Lanka. It is located within Central Province.

== Ihagama Rathanapala Thero ==
In the early 19th century, Ihagama was home to Ihagama Rathanapala Thero, also known as Ihagama Unnanse, a Buddhist monk who played a pivotal role in the independence struggles against British colonial rule in Sri Lanka. He was involved in the 1818 rebellion and later exiled to Mauritius.

== See also ==
- List of towns in Central Province, Sri Lanka
