= Elmo Noel Joseph Perera =

Roman Catholic bishop

- Bishop of Galle
- Church: Catholic Church
- Diocese: Diocese of Galle
- In office: 1 June 1995 – 11 October 2004
- Predecessor: Don Sylvester Wewitavidanelage
- Successor: Harold Anthony Perera
- Previous posts: Titular Bishop of Gadiaufala (1992-1995); Auxiliary Bishop of Galle (1992-1995)

Orders
- Ordination: 21 December 1960
- Consecration: 6 January 1993 by Pope John Paul II

Personal details
- Born: 4 December 1932 Madampe, North Western Province, Island of Ceylon and its Dependencies, British Empire
- Died: 9 April 2015 (aged 82)

Elmo Noel Joseph Perera (4 December 1932 – 9 April 2015) was a Roman Catholic bishop.

Perera was ordained to the priesthood in 1960. In 1992, Perera was named auxiliary bishop of the Roman Catholic Diocese of Galle, Sri Lanka and then, in 1995, diocesan bishop of the Diocese of Galle. Perera resigned in 2004.
