= Daluwatumulla =

Coordinates: 6°11′N 80°05′E

- Interactive map of Daluwatumulla
- Country: Sri Lanka
- Province: Southern Province
- Time zone: UTC+5:30 (Sri Lanka Standard Time)

Daluwatumulla is a small town in Southern Province, Sri Lanka.

== See also ==
- List of towns in Southern Province, Sri Lanka
