= Nabadowa =

Coordinates: 6°07′N 80°21′E

- Interactive map of Nabadowa
- Country: Sri Lanka
- Province: Southern Province
- Time zone: UTC+5:30 (Sri Lanka Standard Time)

Nabadowa is a small town within Southern Province in Sri Lanka.

== See also ==
- List of towns in Southern Province, Sri Lanka
