= Pahala Ganegama =

Coordinates: 6°02′N 80°31′E

- Interactive map of Pahala Ganegama
- Country: Sri Lanka
- Province: Southern Province
- Time zone: UTC+5:30 (Sri Lanka Standard Time)

Pahala Ganegama is a small town in Sri Lanka. It is located within Southern Province.

== See also ==
- List of towns in Southern Province, Sri Lanka
