= Jalampitiya =

Coordinates: 6°14′N 80°44′E

- Interactive map of Jalampitiya
- Country: Sri Lanka
- Province: Southern Province
- Time zone: UTC+5:30 (Sri Lanka Standard Time)

Jalampitiya is a small town in Southern Province, Sri Lanka.

== See also ==
- List of towns in Southern Province, Sri Lanka
