= Badabadda =

- Location within Sri Lanka
- Coordinates: 7.3211°N 80.0166°E
- Country: Sri Lanka
- Province: Southern Province
- Time zone: UTC+5:30 (Sri Lanka Standard Time)

Badabadda is a small town located in the Southern Province of Sri Lanka. Geographically, it is situated at approximately 6°7'0" North latitude and 80°40'0" East longitude.

The town falls under the administrative jurisdiction of the Hakmana Divisional Secretariat.

For a visual representation, you can refer to the satellite map of Badabadda.

== See also ==
- List of towns in Southern Province, Sri Lanka
