= Ehelapola =

Coordinates: 7°38′N 80°37′E

Ehelapola, Sri Lanka
- Interactive map of Ehelapola, Sri Lanka
- Country: Sri Lanka
- Province: Southern Province
- Time zone: UTC+5:30 (Sri Lanka Standard Time)

Ehelapola is a small town in Sri Lanka. It is located within Southern Province.

== See also ==
- List of towns in Southern Province, Sri Lanka
