= Kalahe =

- Village
- Location within Sri Lanka
- Coordinates: 06°01′45″N 80°15′25″E
- Country: Sri Lanka
- Province: Southern Province
- District: Galle
- Time zone: UTC+5:30 (Sri Lanka Standard Time)

Kalahe is a village in Galle District in Sri Lanka, located 7 km (4.3 mi) south-west of Galle and 3 km (1.9 mi) west of Unawatuna.

== Etymology ==
There are two stories as to how the name Kalahe is derived, the first relates to the fact the local population rebelled against the activities of the foreigners and so the village was called Kalahe, which means "quarreling". The other is that a golden pot (කළය) was found buried in the earth in the village, called Kalahe.

== Transport ==
Kalahe is located on the A17 highway, connecting Galle to Madampe, not far from Exit 9 on the E02 Southern Expressway.

== Attractions ==
- Yatagala Raja Maha Viharaya (Yatagala Temple), is a rock temple with a 9m reclining Buddha, which has a 2,300-year-old Bo tree established during the reign of King Devanam Piyatissa of the Anuradhapura period.
- Kalahe Methodist Church, constructed in 1879.

== Education ==
- Kalahe Sri Sumangalodaya MV School

== See also ==
- List of towns in Southern Province, Sri Lanka
