= Obadawatta =

Coordinates: 6°25′N 80°00′E

- Interactive map of Obadawatta
- Country: Sri Lanka
- Province: Southern Province
- Time zone: UTC+5:30 (Sri Lanka Standard Time)

Obadawatta is a small town in Sri Lanka. It is located within Southern Province.

== See also ==
- List of towns in Southern Province, Sri Lanka
