= Udakanuketiya =

Coordinates: 6°08′N 80°56′E

- Interactive map of Udakanuketiya
- Country: Sri Lanka
- Province: Southern Province
- Time zone: UTC+5:30 (SLST)

Udakanuketiya is a small town in Southern Province, Sri Lanka.

== See also ==
- List of towns in Southern Province, Sri Lanka
