= Habakkala =

Coordinates: 6°22′N 80°01′E

- Interactive map of Habakkala
- Country: Sri Lanka
- Province: Southern Province
- Time zone: UTC+5:30 (Sri Lanka Standard Time)

Habakkala is a small town in Sri Lanka. It is located within Southern Province. The closest city to Habakkala is Bentota.

== See also ==
- List of towns in Southern Province, Sri Lanka
