= Ovilikanda =

- Location within Sri Lanka
- Coordinates: 7°27′N 80°34′E
- Country: Sri Lanka
- Province: Central Province
- Time zone: UTC+5:30 (Sri Lanka Standard Time)

Ovilikanda is a small town in Sri Lanka. It is located within Central Province. There are several Spice and Herbal Gardens in Ovilikanda.

== Natural features ==
Rainforests and wildlife viewing: Pitawala Pathana, Riverstone Gap and Kaludiya Pokuna. Ambokka Mountain.

Waterfalls including Sera Ella falls and Bambarakiri Ella Falls.

Bodies of water: Sembuwaththa Lake, Kalu Ganga Reservoir

== See also ==
- List of towns in Central Province, Sri Lanka
