= Owitipana =

Coordinates: 7°32′N 80°36′E

- Interactive map of Owitipana
- Country: Sri Lanka
- Province: Central Province
- Time zone: UTC+5:30 (Sri Lanka Standard Time)

Owitipana is a small town in Sri Lanka. It is located within Central Province.

== See also ==
- List of towns in Central Province, Sri Lanka
