= Rajjammana =

Coordinates: 7°37′N 80°40′E

- Interactive map of Rajjammana
- Country: Sri Lanka
- Province: Central Province

Government
- Time zone: UTC+5:30 (Sri Lanka Standard Time)
- SL: 0094
- Area code: 21000
- Website: www.lahiru-kahawatta.weebly.com

Rajjammana is a small village in the Matale District of Sri Lanka, located within Central Province. Most of its inhabitants are farmers. It has a mini hydroelectric power plant, and the ministry has also proposed building a water cleaning plant in the future.

== See also ==
- List of towns in Central Province, Sri Lanka
