= Haburugala =

Coordinates: 6°24′N 80°02′E

- Interactive map of Haburugala
- Country: Sri Lanka
- Province: Southern Province
- Time zone: UTC+5:30 (Sri Lanka Standard Time)

Haburugala is a small town in Sri Lanka. It is located within the Southern Province. Sri Punyarathana Dhamma School in Choola Bodhi Viharaya Buddhist temple, Dharmaraja Vidyalaya, and Elakaka Maha Vidyalaya schools are situated in Haburugala. Most of the villagers are farmers who spend their time in paddy fields. The path to the village is surrounded by beautiful scenes such as the Dedduwa River, Bentota River, Bentota Beach, and Dedduwa marshland. A typical day has a temperature of around 26 degrees Celsius.

== See also ==
- List of towns in Southern Province, Sri Lanka
