= Ovitipana =

Coordinates: 7°32′N 80°36′E

- Interactive map of Ovitipana
- Country: Sri Lanka
- Province: Southern Province
- Time zone: UTC+5:30 (Sri Lanka Standard Time)

Ovitipana is a small town in Sri Lanka. It is located within Southern Province. Ovitipana has a population of 21,481,334 and an approximate population for 7 km radius from this point: 76017
