= China Garden =

- Interactive map of China Garden
- Coordinates: 6°2′0″N 18°13′0″E
- Country: Sri Lanka
- Province: Southern Province
- Time zone: UTC+5:30 (Sri Lanka Standard Time)

China Garden is a small town in Sri Lanka. It is located in Southern Province. The name is believed to refer to Chinese migrant labourers who were brought to the area for agricultural work in the early 19th century by Frederick North, then the colonial Governor of Ceylon.

== See also ==
- List of towns in Southern Province, Sri Lanka
