= St. Mary's Cathedral, Galle =

Roman Catholic cathedral in Galle, Sri Lanka

Cathedral of St. Mary
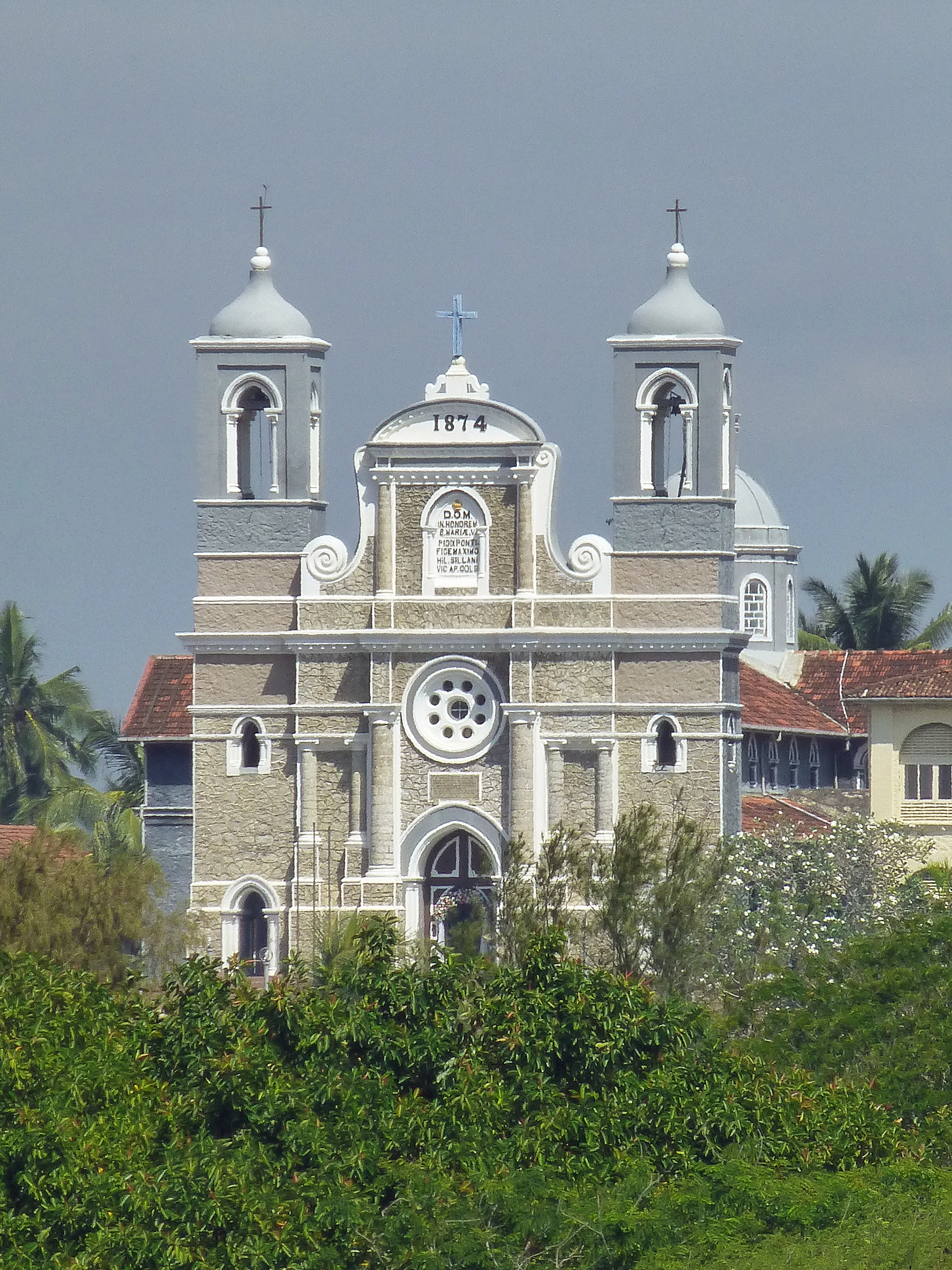

Religion
- Affiliation: Roman Catholic
- Rite: Latin Rite
- Status: Cathedral

Location
- Location: Galle, Sri Lanka
- Interactive map of Cathedral of St. Mary
- Coordinates: 6°2′9.8″N 80°12′45.8″E

Architecture
- Type: Church
- Style: Baroque Revival
- Groundbreaking: 1874; 152 years ago

Website
- www.cathedralgalle.org

The Cathedral of St. Mary, Queen of the Holy Rosary (Sinhala: Galla Santha Mariya Asana Dewu Mædura), is the cathedral church of the Roman Catholic Diocese of Galle. It is a landmark in the city of Galle, Sri Lanka. The cathedral was built by the Society of Jesus at the end of the 19th century. The first bishop was the Belgian Jesuit Joseph Van Reeth.

The cathedral is central and important to the Catholics of southern Sri Lanka in the Diocese of Galle. The church is dedicated to the Blessed Virgin Mary.
