= Maddegama =

Maddegama is a village in the western province, Sri Lanka of Sri Lanka. It is located next to the Kirindiwela-Hanwella road.

It is divided to three administrative (Grama Niladhari) divisions.

383 Maddegama
383/A Maddegama North
383/B Maddegama South

The main administrative centre for the "Dompe" electorate in Gampaha district is physically located in Maddegama at the site of the old "wake" Government Rest House.

Other villages bordering Maddegama includes: Udagama, Pallegama, Hissalla and Werahara.

Most of the land area of Maddegama are used for cultivation of rice and coconuts. They are typically small plots owned by subsistence farmers. The hilly areas are used for small rubber plantations. Maddegama is exclusively known for the large fruit trees of "gadu-guda". It also has large number of other trees such as "Rambutan" and Jack fruit.

During the time of President Premadasa a section of Maddegama was developed as an "Udagama" dedicated to teachers. This is named as the "Gurugama".

Maddegama temple known as "Maddegame Rajamaha Viharaya" is known to have a historical importance. It is said to be going back to the time of King Walagamba. The bhodiya (bo tree) also known to be closely related to the "Sri Maha Bhodiya" at Anuradapuraya. This temple was used as a location for the teledrama "Nadagamkaroyo" and there are many videos avaialable in the internet about the location.

One of the landmarks of Maddegama is "Na-Vatiya". This is the pathway to the historical "Maligawa". The name Maligawa was given to the large house owned by the Bandaranayake family. This was originally built by the Sir Solomon Dias Bandaranaike. Bandaranayake family members (Felix Dias. and Anura) used this as the base for their political activities in the Dompe electorate.

The land around the "Maligawa" is known as the "Maligawaththa". In olden days part of this land was used as an exotic fruit garden by the Sir Solomon. This may be the reason for most of Sri Lanka's supply of the fruit "gadu-guda" (Lansium parasiticum) is coming from Maddegama.

The area of Na-Vatiya and the current AGA office is known as "wake". This is said to be a corruption of the word "waikkiya" which was the court of the Mudliar Sir Solomon Dias Bandaranaike.

== Government Institutes ==
- Assistant Government Agent's office Local administrative center of the central government (Dompe Divisional Secretariat)
- Maddegama Maha Vidyalaya: High School
- Ceylon Electricity Board: Kirindiwela Depot

== See also ==
- List of towns in Sri Lanka
