= Ginimellagaha =

Ginimallagaha
- Village
- Ginimellagaha
- Location in Sri Lanka
- Coordinates: 6°13′N 80°16′E
- Province: Southern Province
- District: Galle District
- Time zone: UTC+5:30 (Sri Lanka Standard Time)
- Main Post Office : Ginimellgaha: 80220
- Area code: 091

Ginimellagaha is a village in Galle District, Sri Lanka, 16 km from Galle located within Baddegama divisional secretary area
