= Walgama =

- Village
- Country: Sri Lanka
- Province: Southern Province
- Time zone: UTC+5:30 (Sri Lanka Standard Time)

Walgama is a village in Sri Lanka. It is located in Matara District, Southern Province.

== See also ==
- List of towns in Central Province, Sri Lanka
