= Talangalla =

Coordinates: 6°17′N 80°23′E

- Interactive map of Talangalla
- Country: Sri Lanka
- Province: Southern Province
- Time zone: UTC+5:30 (Sri Lanka Standard Time)

Talangalla is a small town in Sri Lanka. It is located within Southern Province.

== See also ==
- List of hometown in Southern Province, Sri Lanka
