= List of Archaeological Protected Monuments in Kandy District =

This is a list of Archaeological Protected Monuments in Kandy District, Sri Lanka.

Monument	Image	Location	Grama Niladhari Division	Divisional Secretary's Division	Registered	Description	Refs
Alawathugoda Saman Devalaya			Alawatugoda	Akurana	8 April 2009	Devale Premises, its buildings and other archaeological remains situated within the limits	
Alugalgelena Cave		Kaikawala		Udadumbara	27 July 2001	Pre-historic cave	
Aluthgama Nagahamula Hena (Pansal Watte)			Aluthgama Lower	Hatharaliyadda	6 June 2008	Drip-ledged rock cave	
Ambalawa Raja Maha Vihara			No. 228-Wattapuluwa	Gangawata Koralaya	6 June 2008	Buddhist shrine	
Amunewela Raja Maha Vihara		Kahawatte	Kahawatte	Poojapitiya	6 June 2008	Inscriptions and drip-ledged rock cave	
Asgiri Gedige Vihara		Kandy city limits		Kandy	13 March 1970	Buddha shrine	
Attaragama Raja Maha Vihara			Attaragama	Harispattuwa	22 November 2002	Cave temple with paintings	
Badagalla Gale Vihara			Badagalla	Poojapitiya	6 June 2008	Buddhist shrine; flight of steps on the rock, on which the chaitiya is located; and olinda poruwa	
Balana Kumarakande Devalaya			No. 202, Ketakumbura	Yatinuwara	22 July 2011	Drip-ledged caves	
Bambaragala Raja Maha Vihara		Wewagama		Harispattuwa	9 February 1973	Cave temple with paintings	
Bodhirukhkharama Vihara		Siwurupitiya		Hatharaliyadda	8 July 2005	Tempita vihara	
Bodhirukhakharama Vihara		Meeyanpaha	Hakmana	Medadumbara	15 April 2016	Vishnu Devala within the premises	
Bogambara Devala		Watagalatenna	Watagalatenna	Poojapitiya	17 May 2013	Devalaya located in the territory of the Devramvehera Meditation Centre in Devalatenna	
Bogambara Police Officers Quarters			Deiyannewela	Gangawata Koralaya	6 June 2008	Government building	
Botota Pathini Temple			No. 483-Bohotta	Harispattuwa	6 June 2008		
Botota Raja Maha Vihara		Botota		Katugastota	22 November 2002	Buddha shrine	
British Garrison Cemetery				Gangawata Koralaya	22 July 2011		
Bulathwaththa Walawwa		Udugoda	Udugoda	Panvila	12 June 2015	Atuwa (barn)	
Butawatta Damma discourse hall			Butawatta South	Pathahewaheta	6 June 2008		
Buwalikada court building		Buwalikada	Buwalikada	Gangawata Koralaya	22 October 2010	Four buildings located by north and court building	
Dalugalle Raja Maha Vihara		Idamegama		Galagedara	22 November 2002	Image house	
Dalukgolla Raja Maha Vihara		Dalukgolla	No. 270 Ampitiya Udagama	Gangawata Koralaya	24 July 2009	Image house and Sangawasaya (Dwelling house)	
Dambarawa Devalaya		Dambarawa		Pathadumbara	18 September 1964		
Dankumbura Purana Vihara			Dankumbura	Hatharaliyadda	22 October 2010	Dwelling house and Tampita Image house	
Danture Tampita Vihara		Danture		Yatinuwara	14 May 1971		
Dawlagala ambalama			Dawlagala	Udunuwara	30 August 1974	Ambalama	
Dawson Tower		Kadugannawa	Kadugannawa	Yatinuwara	6 July 2007		
Dedunupitiya Kande Vihara		Dedunupitiya	Damunupola	Hatharaliyadda	22 November 2002	Len Vihara	
Degaldoruwa Raja Maha Viharaya		Amunugama		Kundasale	22 May 1964	Image house with paintings	
Degaldoruwa Raja Maha Viharaya		Amunugama	No. 633, Sirimalwatta, Pallegama	Kundasale	24 July 2009	Pohaya Geya, Sangawasa (dwelling house) and wall surrounding Bodhi Tree	
Deganthilaka Vihara		Dehigashinna	Pothdalgoda	Medadumbara	15 April 2016	Drip-ledged cave and stone plight of steps	
Dehideniya Bodhirukkarama Vihara			Dehideniya	Thumpane	23 February 2007	Image house	
Dehipagoda Agrabodhi Vihara			Dehipagoda East	Udunuwara	22 October 2010	Two image houses, Dagoba and two moonstones	
Deldeniya Purana Vihara			Deldeniya	Yatinuwara	6 June 2008	Chaitya	
Dharmagara Purana Vihara			No. 362-Kadugannawa	Yatinuwara	6 June 2008	Dhamma discourse hall and Bhikku dwelling	
Diyakelinawa Raja Maha Vihara		Muruthalawa	Lower Dodamwela	Yatinuwara	6 June 2008	Buddhist shrine	
Dodanwala Devalaya		Dodanwala		Yatinuwara	16 July 1948		
Doolwela Manapadassana cave complex			Udadoolwela	Harispattuwa	23 January 2009	Drip-ledged caves in the Doolwela Manapadassana cave complex, together with Brahmi rock inscriptions	
Doragamuwa Shylapabbatharama Vihara		Doragamuwa		Pathadumbara	24 July 2009	Tampita Viharaya (Viharaya built on stone piles) with a two storeyed Dhammasala, Sanghavasa with a centre courtyard, flight of steps carved on the rock leaving the chaitya and pillar foundation	
Doramadalawa Raja Maha Vihara				Harispattuwa	9 September 2011	Bell tower and two flights of steps on the original rock, cave temple with drip-Ledged	
Dunuwila Walauwa		Kandy		Kandy	8 July 2005	Kandy Municipal office building, Sri Dalada Thapovana street	
Ehelepola Walauwa		Kandy		Kandy	8 July 2005	Walawwa, Raja Veediya	
Embekka Devalaya			Embekke	Udunuwara	23 January 2009	Embekke Dewale together with the building complex of the same era, Gale Ambalama	
Empire Hotel, Kandy		Kandy		Kandy	8 July 2005	Two-storey hotel, No 21 Temple Street	
Gadaladeniya Vihara			Gadaladeniya	Udunuwara	11 May 1956	Vihara, Devalaya and rock inscription	
Galagedera Delgasyaya drip-ledged rock cave (Bagawalena)			Maussawa	Thumpane	6 June 2008		
Gale Purana Vihara		Tittapajjala		Katugastota	22 November 2002	Image house	
Galkotuwa ruins			Galkotuwa	Medadumbara	15 April 2016	Drip-ledged cave	
Gallengolla Potgul Vihara		Gallengolla	Urulewatta	Udunuwara	24 July 2009	Drip-ledged caves, three-storey Image house, Chaitya, Dhamma Sala and flight of steps	
Galmaduwa Raja Maha Vihara		Nattaranpotha		Pathadumbara	27 August 1948		
Gangathilake Raja Maha Vihara			Bothalapitiya	Udapalatha	6 June 2008	Henakantha Biso Bandara Sohona	
Gannoruwa Raja Maha Vihara			No. 133-Gannoruwa	Yatinuwara	6 June 2008	Buddhist shrine and chaitya	
Giddawa Purana Vihara			Giddawa	Medadumbara	15 April 2016	Buddhist shrine, Dharmasala and two Chaityas in the premises	
Giragama Walawwa		Kandy		Kandy	8 July 2005	Walawwa, cnr Yatinuwara Veediya and Sir Bennet Soysa Veediya	
Giragama Walawwa		No. 180		Yatinuwara	23 February 2007		
Godamune Walawwa		Udagama		Kandy	8 July 2005		
Gunadaha ruins		Gunadaha	Gunadaha	Galagedara	15 April 2016	Drip-ledged cave on land called Kataram Kumbure Pillewa	
Hanthana Raja Maha Vihara			Udawela Udagama East	Pathahewaheta	6 July 2007	Image house and Awasage	
Heeloya Purana Vihara			Heeloya	Medadumbara	15 April 2016	Shrine	
Heepitiya Purana Vihara		Alawathugirigama		Kundasale	23 February 2007	Image house with paintings and images	
Hindagala Raja Maha Vihara			No. 267, Hindagala	Gangawata Koralaya	24 July 2009	Drip-ledged cave temple, two drip-ledged caves and rock inscriptions	
Idame Walawwa		Rambukwella		Medadumbara	23 February 2007	House known as Idamewalawwa alias “Hakmana Niwasa”	
Kadawara Devala		Gabbala	Gabbala	Medadumbara	15 April 2016		
Kadirashan Temple		Gampola town	Gampola	Udapalatha	9 September 2011		
Kaikawala Mul Gedara		Kaikawala		Udadumbara	18 June 1999	At Kumbure Gedara land premises	
Kaloyuwawa Kande Vihara			No. 334 Kaloyuwawa	Hatharaliyadda	22 November 2002	Tampita Vihara and dwelling house	
Kandepitiya Vihara			Muruddeniya	Hatharaliyadda	22 November 2002	Tempita vihara	
Kande Walawwa		Kandagammedda	Kandagammedda	Medadumbara	15 April 2016		
Kandy Charity compilation society building		Kandy		Kandy	8 July 2005	Yatinuwara Veediya	
Christ Church, Kandy		Kandy		Kandy	8 July 2005	Anglican Church, Yatinuwara Veediya	
Kandy Development Corporation building bearing assessment no 5		Kandy		Kandy	8 July 2005	Deva Veediya	
Kandy Laksala building		Kandy		Kandy	8 July 2005	Deva Veediya	
Methodist Church, Kandy		Kandy		Kandy	8 July 2005	Methodist Church, Yatinuwara Veediya	
Prince of Wales fountain		Kandy		Kandy	8 July 2005	A fountain at the junction of Temple Street and Deva Veediya, erected by the Coffee Planters of Ceylon to commemorate the visit of HRH Prince of Wales to Kandy in 1875	
Kandy Post Office		Kandy		Kandy	8 July 2005	Sri Dalada Thapovana street	
Kandy president house's trust home		Kandy		Kandy	8 July 2005	Sri Dalada Thapovana street	
Karagala Devalaya			Wathupola	Ganga Ihala Korale	22 July 2011	Drip-ledged cave with Karagala Devala building and drip-ledged cave situated in Devale Diggala rock	
Katapitiya Purana Vihara			Kotaligoda	Yatinuwara	6 June 2008	Buddhist shrine	
Kataragama Devalaya, Kandy		Kandy city limits		Kandy	14 May 1971		
Kataragama Devalaya, Wallabagoda		Wallabagoda	No. 1068 Wallabagoda	Ganga Ihala Korale	8 April 2009	Buildings and other archaeological remains situated within the limits	
Katarangala cave		Dakwariwaththa Aluth kotasa	Randiwela	Medadumbara	15 April 2016	Katarangala cave and drip-ledged cave situated at surrounding area	
Katarangala Purana Vihara				Harispattuwa	6 June 2008	Buddhist shrine	
Katugoda, Diganakelewatta ruins			No. 789	Medadumbara	30 December 2011	Three drip-ledged caves and Kethukavata, Thrisula Markin on land called Katugoda, Diganakelewatta in the Poddalgoda Village	
Kevulgama Ambalama		Hunnasgiriya	Kevulgama	Udadumbara	6 June 2008	Ambalama	
Kinikandura Temple			Pamunetenna	Udadumbara	6 June 2008	Drip-ledged rock cave with Kinikandura Temple on land called Dewale Langa Hena	
Kobbekaduwa Raja Maha Vihara			Kobbekaduwa	Yatinuwara	6 June 2008	Buddhist shrine and drip-ledged rock cave	
Kondadeniya Raja Maha Vihara		Kondadeniya		Harispattuwa	23 February 2007	Image house with paintings and sculptures	
Kotamundungala Raja Maha Vihara			No. 498 Molagoda	Poojapitiya	30 December 2011	Cave temple, cave inscription, water drain and the feet washing stone carved in the stone inside the drip-ledged cave	
Kumburegama Udaha Wallawa			Kumburegama	Thumpane	23 February 2007	Buildings and Atuge	
Kurukohogama Rajamaha Vihara			Kurukohogama	Medadumbara	15 April 2016	Shrine	
Lankatilaka Vihara		Hiyarapitiya		Udunuwara	16 December 1949	Vihara, Devalaya and natural rock with inscription	
Lankatilaka Vihara		Hiyarapitiya		Udunuwara	17 November 1967	Vahalkada	
Madawala inscription		Madawala		Pathadumbara	23 February 2007	Inscription on the mountain range in land called Akuraketugalewatta	
Madugalle Walawwa		Udispaththuwa	Nilgala	Medadumbara	15 April 2016		
Magulmaduwa at Temple of the Tooth				Gangawata Koralaya	23 February 2007		
Malwatta Pohoyamalu Vihara			No. 254, Malwatta	Gangawata Koralaya	22 October 2010	Pohoya Geya with Image house	
Medagammedda Sekkuwa		Medagammedda	Senarathwela	Medadumbara	15 April 2016	Sekkuwa	
Medawala Raja Maha Vihara		Medawela		Harispattuwa	24 July 2009	Tampita Viharaya (Viharaya built on stone piles) Pohoya Geya, Slab Inscription, hill inscription, Wahalkada, Dagoba and Buddha statue inside the new image house	
Meemure Walawwa		Meemure		Udadumbara	18 June 1999	Upper and lower walawwas and stone walls	
Minigomuwa Purana Vihara		Minigomuwa		Galagedara	22 November 2002	Tempita vihara	
Muladeni Mandiraya		Kandy | No. 357, Kandy	Gangawata Koralaya	22 October 2010	Deva veediya		
Naga Sri Bodhi Vihara		Udagama		Atabage	22 May 1964	Image house with paintings	
Nagavimana Kande Vihara			Malwatta	Gangawata Koralaya	22 October 2010	Image house	
Natha Devale, Kandy		Kandy		Gangawata Koralaya	8 April 2009		
Natha Devalaya, Vegiriya		Vegiriya		Udunuwara	6 August 1965	Devalaya, rock with inscription and cave	
National Insurance Corporation building bearing assessment no 24		Kandy		Kandy	8 July 2005	Kande street	
Niyamgampaya Raja Maha Vihara		Kurukude		Panvila	14 May 1971	Stone door frame and curved rocks	
Official residence building bearing assessment no 73 of Kandy District Secretariat		Kandy		Kandy	8 July 2005	Raja Veediya	
Padurugalpoththa			No. 1159 Megoda Kalugamuwa	Doluwa	23 February 2007	Inscription with characters from the Kandyan period in the rock surface	
Palkumbura Raja Maha Vihara		Palkumbura		Katugastota	22 November 2002	Gedige image house	
Pallehitiyawa Estate Gangarama Vihara		Galahetiyawa	Tittawela	Gangawata Koralaya	6 June 2008	Rock with sun, moon symbols, old inscriptions and archaeological evidences	
Panabokke Walawwa		Elpitiya		Udapalatha	8 July 2005	Walawwa and Atugeya	
Panabokke Walawwa		Kandy		Kandy	8 July 2005	D S Senanayake Veediya	
Paranagam Walawwa		Paranagama		Galagedara	8 July 2005		
Pasgama Sri Nata Devalaya		Pasgama	East Hewawissa	Pathahewaheta	8 April 2009	Devale Premises and its buildings and other archaeological remains, the street and throne hall situated within the premises	
Pattini Devale, Kandy		Kandy		Gangawata Koralaya	8 April 2009		
Pattiyawatta Rajapihilla			Pattiyawatta	Harispattuwa	24 July 2009		
Pethigepitiya Purana Vihara		Mawathupola	No. 580	Harispattuwa	6 June 2008	Dhamma discourse hall	
Pitiyagedara Raja Maha Vihara		Pitiyagedara		Pathadumbara	1 November 1996	Image house with paintings	
Pittawela Ambalama			Pahala Pittawela	Udadumbara	6 June 2008	Ambalama	
Pittawela Raja Maha Vihara			Pahala Pittawela	Udadumbara	6 June 2008	Buddhist shrine, Dhamma discourse hall and stupa	
Pothdalgoda Purana Vihara			Pothdalgoda	Medadumbara	15 April 2016	Shrine	
Pothdalgoda ruins		Pothdalgoda	Pothdalgoda	Medadumbara	15 April 2016	Stone inscription and Chaitya in Ganepitiya land	
Pothgul Vihara				Udapalatha	8 July 2005	Image house and Stupa	
Presbyterian Church (Scots Kirk), Kandy		Kandy		Kandy	8 July 2005	No 127 D S Senanayake Veediya	
Rajaphilla and connected archaeological remains				Gangawata Koralaya	23 February 2007	Rajapihilla Mawatha	
Rajasinharama Raja Maha Vihara			Yatiwawala	Katugastota	22 November 2002	Image house	
Rambukwella Walawwa		Rambukwella	Rambukwella	Medadumbara	6 June 2008		
Sandasiri Dunuwilla Len Vihara				Medadumbara	9 September 2011	Natural Cave and cave dwelling house	
Sanghikarama Vihara			Weliwita, Ihalagama	Hatharaliyadda	22 November 2002	Tempita vihara	
Sath Paththini Devala		Madeniyawaka	Madeniyawaka	Medadumbara	15 April 2016	Building of Udagama Sath Paththini Devala and Stone with the signs of sun and moon found close by	
Senarath Palace ruins		Meda Maha Nuwara		Medadumbara	3 September 1999	In Nuwarawatta land premises	
Sendeniya Raja Maha Vihara			No. 9 - Sendeniya West	Udunuwara	6 June 2008	Buddhist shrine and restricted Bhikku activity hall	
Senkanda cave		Kandy		Kandy	1 October 1972		
Sinhapitiya Malathimala Rock			No. 1018-Sinhapitiya South	Udapalatha	6 June 2008	Restricted Bhikku activity hall	
Sirimalwatte Abeykoon Walawwa			Sirimalwatte-West	Kundasale	17 May 2013	Pre-historic stone implements and the rock with other archaeological remains	
Sirimalwatta Ambalama			Sirimalwaththa West	Kundasale	25 March 2016		
Sooriyagoda Raja Maha Vihara		Sooriyagoda		Yatinuwara	1 October 1953		
Sri Dharmarama Pirivena			Weligodapola	Hatharaliyadda	22 November 2002	Tempita vihara	
Sri Gnanodhaya Vihara			No. 319 Kannadeniya	Thumpane	23 February 2007	Image house with paintings painted only on outside of wall	
Sri Sudarmarama Raja Maha Vihara, Batagalla			Batagalla North	Poojapitiya	30 December 2011	Two-storey image house with old paintings	
Sri Kataragama Devalaya		Ganegoda	No. 1159 Ganegoda	Doluwa	8 April 2009	Devale Premises and building thereof and other archaeological remains, the street and the throne hall	
Sri Nighrodharama Vihara		Kobbegala	Kobbegala	Thumpane	23 February 2007	Cave image house with drip-ledges	
Sri Saranankara Sangharaja Vihara		Vegolla	Weliwita, Pahalagama	Hatharaliyadda	8 July 2005	Delling house and image house	
Sri Uposatharama Vihara		karalliyadda	karalliyadda	Medadumbara	15 April 2016	Stone door and plight of steps of shrine	
Sri Vishudharama Vihara		Galiyawa	Poholiyedda	Thumpane	23 February 2007	Image House with paintings and sculptures	
State Osusala building bearing assessment no 2		Kandy		Kandy	8 July 2005	Kotugodella street	
St. Anthony's Church, Kandy		Kandy		Kandy	8 July 2005	Catholic Cathedral, E. L. Senanayake Veediya	
St. Anthony's Church hall		Kandy		Gangawata Koralaya	22 October 2010	Preaching Hall, adjacent to St. Anthony's Church	
St. Paul's Church, Kandy		Kandy		Kandy	8 July 2005	Anglican Church, Deva Veediya	
Suduhumpola Raja Maha Vihara			Suduhumpola	Gangawata Koralaya	22 October 2010	Image house	
Temple of the Tooth				Gangawata Koralaya	23 February 2007		
Thalwatta Gangarama Vihara		Thalwatta		Gangawata Koralaya	22 October 2010	Image house	
Bakery building bearing assessment no 34		Kandy		Kandy	8 July 2005	Sri Dalada Veediya, Kandy	
Baptist Church building		Kandy		Kandy	8 July 2005	Sri Dalada Veediya, Kandy	
Building bearing assessment no 2		Kandy		Kandy	8 July 2005	Cross street	
Building bearing assessment no 3		Kandy		Kandy	8 July 2005	Raja Veediya	
Building bearing assessment no 5		Kandy		Kandy	8 July 2005	Colombo Veediya	
Building bearing assessment no 9		Kandy		Kandy	8 July 2005	Kande street	
Building bearing assessment no 12, 14, 16, 20		Kandy		Kandy	8 July 2005	Sri Dalada Veediya	
Building bearing assessment no 17		Kandy		Kandy	8 July 2005	Kande street	
Building bearing assessment no 17 to 33		Kandy		Kandy	8 July 2005	Deva veediya	
Building bearing assessment no 22		Kandy		Kandy	8 July 2005	Colombo Veediya	
Building bearing assessment no 26, 28, 30, 32		Kandy		Kandy	8 July 2005	Sri Dalada Veediya, Kandy	
Building bearing assessment no 28		Kandy		Kandy	8 July 2005	Colombo Veediya	
Building bearing assessment no 32		Kandy		Kandy	8 July 2005	D S Senanayake Veediya	
Building bearing assessment no 33		Kandy		Kandy	8 July 2005	Kotugodella street	
Building bearing assessment no 34		Kandy		Kandy	8 July 2005	D S Senanayake Veediya	
Building bearing assessment no 34, 38, 40, 42, 44		Kandy		Kandy	8 July 2005	Peradeniya road	
Building bearing assessment no 41, 43, 45		Kandy		Kandy	8 July 2005	Deva veediya	
Building bearing assessment no 42		Kandy		Kandy	8 July 2005	Kande street	
Building bearing assessment no 44, 46		Kandy		Kandy	8 July 2005	Sri Dalada Veediya, Kandy	
Building bearing assessment no 46		Kandy		Kandy	8 July 2005	D S Senanayake Veediya	
Building bearing assessment no 49		Kandy		Kandy	8 July 2005	Colombo Veediya	
Building bearing assessment no 51		Kandy		Kandy	8 July 2005	Kotugodella street	
Building bearing assessment no 51, 53		Kandy		Kandy	8 July 2005	Colombo Veediya	
Building bearing assessment no 66		Kandy		Kandy	8 July 2005	Peradeniya road	
Building bearing assessment no 80		Kandy		Kandy	8 July 2005	Peradeniya road	
Building bearing assessment no 84, 86		Kandy		Kandy	8 July 2005	Colombo Veediya	
Building bearing assessment no 85, 87, 89, 91		Kandy		Kandy	8 July 2005	Colombo Veediya	
Building bearing assessment no 88		Kandy		Kandy	8 July 2005	Colombo Veediya	
Building bearing assessment no 90, 92		Kandy		Kandy	8 July 2005	Colombo Veediya	
Building bearing assessment no 93, 95, 97		Kandy		Kandy	8 July 2005	Colombo Veediya	
Building bearing assessment no 94, 96		Kandy		Kandy	8 July 2005	Colombo Veediya	
Building bearing assessment no 96		Kandy		Kandy	8 July 2005	Peradeniya road	
Building bearing assessment no 99, 101		Kandy		Kandy	8 July 2005	Colombo Veediya	
Building bearing assessment no 103		Kandy		Kandy	8 July 2005	Colombo Veediya	
Building bearing assessment no 104		Kandy		Kandy	8 July 2005	Yatinuwara Veediya	
Building bearing assessment no 105, 107, 109		Kandy		Kandy	8 July 2005	D S Senanayake veediya	
Building bearing assessment no 108, 110		Kandy		Kandy	8 July 2005	Colombo Veediya	
Building bearing assessment no 111		Kandy		Kandy	8 July 2005	Peradeniya road	
Building bearing assessment no 111, 113, 115		Kandy		Kandy	8 July 2005	Colombo Veediya	
Building bearing assessment no 112, 114		Kandy		Kandy	8 July 2005	Colombo Veediya	
Building bearing assessment no 114, 116, 120		Kandy		Kandy	8 July 2005	Yatinuwara Veediya	
Building bearing assessment no 120		Kandy		Kandy	8 July 2005	Colombo Veediya	
Building bearing assessment no 120, 122, 124, 126, 128		Kandy		Kandy	8 July 2005	D S Senanayake Veediya	
Building bearing assessment no 138		Kandy		Kandy	8 July 2005	Colombo Veediya	
Building bearing assessment no 138		Kandy		Kandy	8 July 2005	D S Senanayake Veediya	
Building bearing assessment no 142		Kandy		Kandy	8 July 2005	Colombo Veediya	
Building bearing assessment no 142, 144, 146, 148		Kandy		Kandy	8 July 2005	D S Senanayake Veediya	
Building bearing assessment no 150		Kandy		Kandy	8 July 2005	Colombo Veediya	
Building bearing assessment no 150, 152, 152/1		Kandy		Kandy	8 July 2005	D S Senanayake Veediya	
Building bearing assessment no 154		Kandy |	Kandy	8 July 2005	Colombo Veediya		
Building bearing assessment no 174, 176, 178, 180, 182, 184		Kandy		Kandy	8 July 2005	Colombo Veediya	
Building bearing assessment no 184		Kandy		Kandy	8 July 2005	D S Senanayake Veediya	
Building bearing assessment no 192, 192 B		Kandy		Kandy	8 July 2005	Colombo Veediya	
Building bearing assessment no 198, 200		Kandy		Kandy	8 July 2005	D S Senanayake Veediya	
Building bearing assessment no 202		Kandy		Kandy	8 July 2005	D S Senanayake Veediya	
Building bearing assessment no 204, 206		Kandy		Kandy	8 July 2005	Colombo Veediya	
Building bearing assessment no 208		Kandy		Kandy	8 July 2005	Colombo Veediya	
Building bearing assessment no 209		Kandy		Kandy	8 July 2005	Colombo Veediya	
Building bearing assessment no 215, 217		Kandy		Kandy	8 July 2005	Colombo Veediya	
Building bearing assessment no 225		Kandy		Kandy	8 July 2005	Peradeniya road	
Building bearing assessment no 227		Kandy		Kandy	8 July 2005	Peradeniya road	
Building bearing assessment no 227		Kandy		Kandy	8 July 2005	D S Senanayake Veediya	
Building bearing assessment no 265, 267		Kandy		Kandy	8 July 2005	Peradeniya road	
Building bearing assessment no 292, 294, 296		Kandy		Kandy	8 July 2005	Peradeniya road	
Building bearing assessment no 337		Kandy		Kandy	8 July 2005	Peradeniya road	
Cargills building		Kandy		Kandy	8 July 2005	3 Sri Dalada Veediya (Ward Street), Kandy	
Church building in Girls' High School premises		Kandy |	Kandy	8 July 2005	Peradeniya road		
Devon Food Court building bearing assessment no 1		Kandy		Kandy	8 July 2005	No. 11, Sri Dalada Veediya	
Hatton National Bank building bearing assessment no 1		Kandy		Kandy	8 July 2005	Sri Dalada Veediya	
House bearing assessment no 114		Kandy		Kandy	8 July 2005	Kotugodella street	
House bearing assessment no 322		Kandy		Kandy	8 July 2005	Peradeniya road	
House bearing assessment no 346		Kandy		Kandy	8 July 2005	Peradeniya road	
House bearing assessment no 356, 358		Kandy		Kandy	8 July 2005	Peradeniya road	
House bearing assessment no 409		Kandy		Kandy	8 July 2005	Peradeniya road	
House bearing assessment no 457, 459		Kandy		Kandy	8 July 2005	Peradeniya road	
Kodithuwakku Arachchi building		Kandy		Kandy	8 July 2005	Sri Dalada Veediya, Kandy	
Lawyers office building bearing assessment no 6		Kandy		Kandy	8 July 2005	Colombo Veediya	
Former Bank of Ceylon building		Kandy		Kandy	8 July 2005	No. 22 Sri Dalada Veediya, Kandy	
Building at Asoka College, Kandy		Kandy		Kandy	8 July 2005	D S Senanayake Veediya	
Building, which belonged to St. Sylvester's College		Kandy		Kandy	8 July 2005	Yatinuwara Veediya	
Salvation Army building, bearing assessment no 26		Kandy		Kandy	8 July 2005	Colombo Veediya	
Second Volunteer Sinha Regiment headquarters building		Kandy		Kandy	8 July 2005	Raja Veediya	
Second Volunteer Sinha Regiment officials residence, Kandy		Kandy		Kandy	8 July 2005	Yatinuwara Veediya	
Tittawela Raja Maha Vihara			Tittawela	Gangawata Koralaya	6 June 2008	Bhikku rest house	
Udaaludeniya Raja Maha Vihara		Udaaludeniya		Udunuwara	23 February 1967	Wooden door frame, inscriptions and moonstone	
Udarathmeewala Sri Saddodayaramaya Vihara		Udarathmeewala		Yatinuwara	30 December 2011	Drip-ledged cave	
Udawela Purana Bodhimalu Vihara		Udawela	Udawela	Medadumbara	15 April 2016	Shrine	
Udispattuwa Sri Pushparama Vihara		Udispattuwa		Medadumbara	6 June 2008	A Buddha shrine and Dhamma Sermon Hall	
Uduwawala Ambalama		Uduwawala	No. 418, Uduwawala North	Harispattuwa	13 February 2009		
Uduwawala Purana Vihara			Uduwawala West	Katugastota	22 November 2002	Dwelling house	
Uduwawala Raja Maha Vihara		Uduwawala		Harispattuwa	1 November 1996	Image house with paintings	
Unanbuwa Purana Vihara			No. 1121-Unambuwa	Udapalatha	6 June 2008	Tampita Buddhist shrine	
Upper Kattukale Tourist Police Quarters			No. 258, Upper Katukale	Gangawata Koralaya	23 January 2009		
Urulawatta Purana Vihara			Uralawatta	Udunuwara	22 October 2010	Stone staircase and Chaitya with drip-ledged cave/vihara situated in Sathpaththini Devala and Vihara premises	
Veheragla Chaitya			No. 615, Udathalawinna	Pathadumbara	22 October 2010		
Vidyadarshana Piriven Vihara		Waththegama	Waththegama	Pathadumbara	15 April 2016	Two-storey building	
Vishnu Devale, Kandy		Kandy		Gangawata Koralaya	8 April 2009		
Walawaththa Walawwa		Walawaththa	Randeniya	Medadumbara	15 April 2016	Well and Pihilla on the land	
Walwasagoda Raja Maha Vihara			No. 1067 Herakola	Ganga Ihala Korale	15 April 2016	Chaithyaghara, Chaitya and stone inscription	
Waradiwela Purwarama Vihara			Waradiwela	Medadumbara	15 April 2016	Shrine	
Warathenna stone well		Warathenna	No. 439, Warathenna	Harispattuwa	25 March 2016	Stone well (sluice)	
Wathupola Ambalama			Wathupola	Udunuwara	22 July 2011		
Wattapola Dhamma discourse hall			No. 121 - Wattapola	Udunuwara	6 June 2008		
Wattaranthanna Purana Gallen Vihara			Wattaranthanna	Gangawata Koralaya	22 October 2010	Image house and drip-ledged cave	
Wattegama Maliyadeva Purana Cave Temple			Ihala Yatawara	Pathadumbara	30 December 2011	Drip-ledged cave	
Weheragala Raja maha Vihara			Galabewa	Galagedara	6 June 2008	Drip-ledged rock cave, rock cave vihara, rock inscriptions and rock engraved with steps	
Welagama Raja Maha Vihara			Welagama	Hatharaliyadda	22 November 2002	Len Vihara, dwelling house, stone inscription with 1843 mark and 3 caves with drip ledges	
Weliwita Pahalagama ruins			Eramuduliyadda	Thumpane	12 June 2015	Drip-ledged cave on the land called Rathnehegedara Hitinawaththa, Ketala, Weliwita Pahalagama, Hatharaliyadda	
Wendaruwa Kiri Vihara		udagammedda	udagammedda	Medadumbara	15 April 2016	Shrine and other archaeological evidences within the premises	
Wewatenne Dhamma discourse hall		Wewatenne		Doluwa	6 June 2008		
Yahangala		Pililladeniya		Pathadumbara	23 February 2007	Pre-historic stone implements and the rock with other archaeological remains	
