= Giddawa-Waradiwela Grama Niladhari Division =

Giddawa-Waradiwela
- Grama Niladhari Division
- Interactive map of Giddawa-Waradiwela
- Coordinates: 7.347476°N 80.759797°E
- Country: Sri Lanka
- Province: Central Province
- District: Kandy District
- Divisional Secretariat: Medadumbara Divisional Secretariat
- Electoral District: Kandy Electoral District
- Polling Division: Teldeniya Polling Division

Area
  - Total: 0.56 km^{2} (0.22 sq mi)
- Elevation: 691 m (2,267 ft)

Population (2012)
  - Total: 443
  - Density: 791/km^{2} (2,050/sq mi)
- ISO 3166 code: LK-2124115

Giddawa-Waradiwela

Giddawa-Waradiwela Grama Niladhari Division is a Grama Niladhari Division of the Medadumbara Divisional Secretariat of Kandy District of Central Province, Sri Lanka. It has Grama Niladhari Division Code 752.

Waradiwala is located within, nearby or associated with Giddawa-Waradiwela.

Giddawa-Waradiwela is a surrounded by the Waradiwela, Weliketiya, Dunhinna and Randiwela Grama Niladhari Divisions.

== Demographics ==
=== Ethnicity ===
The Giddawa-Waradiwela Grama Niladhari Division has a Sinhalese majority (96.4%). In comparison, the Medadumbara Divisional Secretariat (which contains the Giddawa-Waradiwela Grama Niladhari Division) has a Sinhalese majority (75.1%) and a significant Indian Tamil population (10.6%)

Ethnicity in Giddawa-Waradiwela
1. Sinhalese (96.4%)
2. Malay (2.70%)
3. Other (0.90%)

=== Religion ===
The Giddawa-Waradiwela Grama Niladhari Division has a Buddhist majority (96.4%). In comparison, the Medadumbara Divisional Secretariat (which contains the Giddawa-Waradiwela Grama Niladhari Division) has a Buddhist majority (74.8%) and a significant Hindu population (16.2%)

Religion in Giddawa-Waradiwela
1. Buddhist (96.4%)
2. Muslim (3.60%)
3. Other (0.00%)
