= Korale =

Sri Lanka revenue district

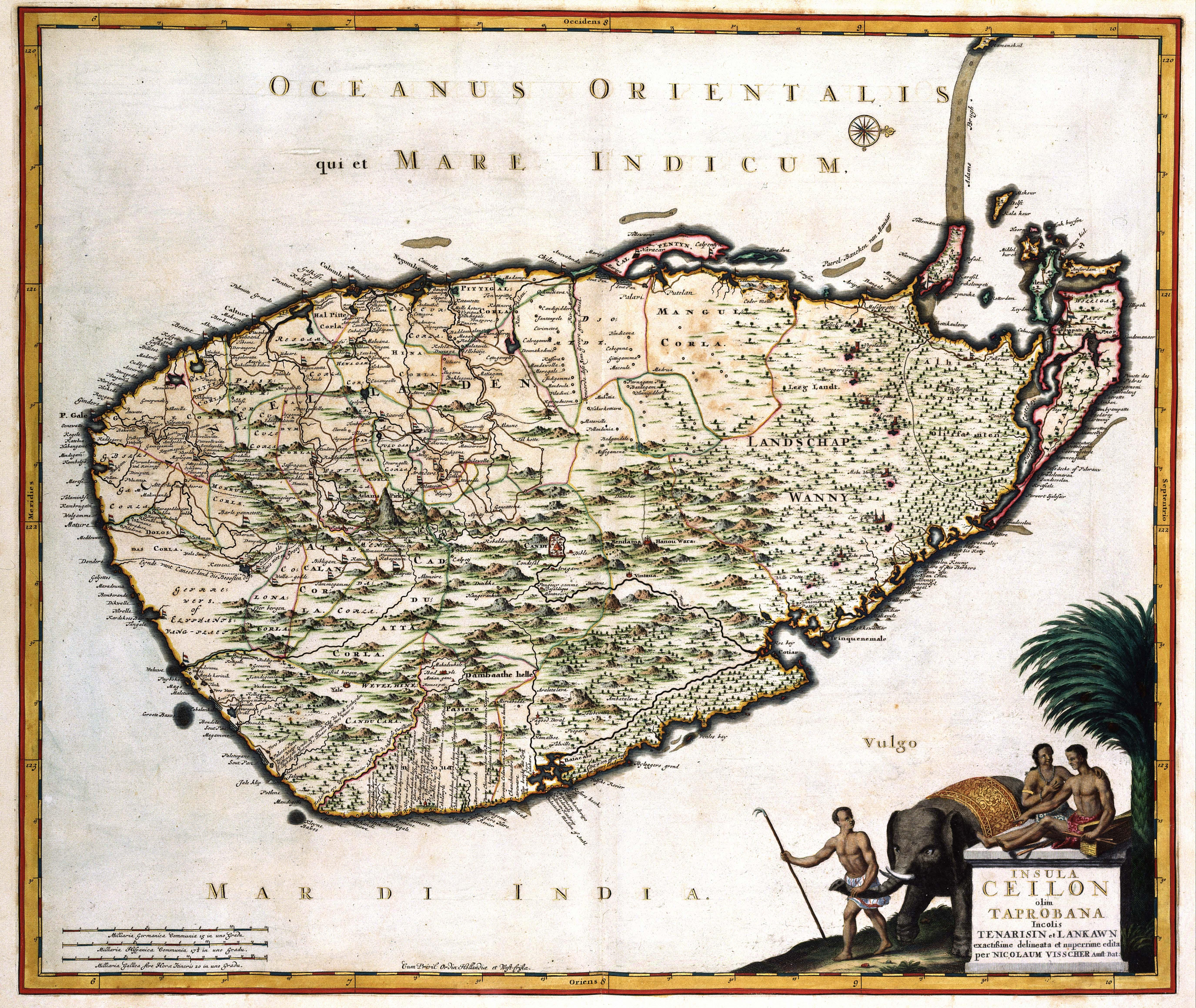
17th century Dutch map of Sri Lanka depicting several Corale.

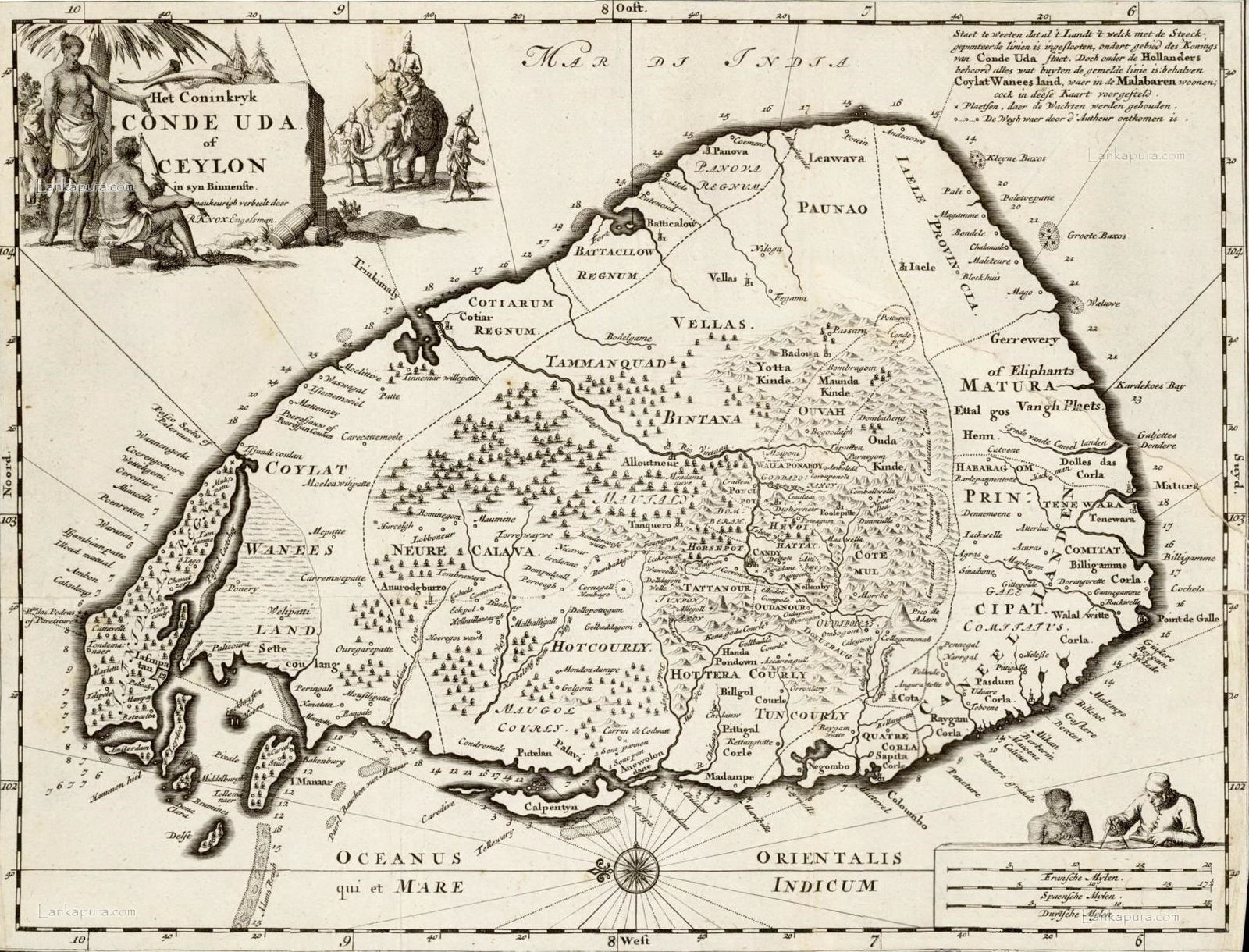
Robert Knox's 1681 map of Sri Lanka depicting several Corale.

A Korale or Corale was formerly a revenue district in Ceylon (Sri Lanka). During the British colonial administration, a low country korale was under the purview of a Mudaliyar while an upcountry korale came under the purview of a post that was itself known as Korale or Korale Mahaththaya. To this day localities retain their old names and most land titles retain reference to the Korale the land is located in.

These korales were further subdivided into 'wasamas', the subdivisions governed by an arachchi. These 'wasamas' or 'wasams' contained at least one to several villages within them, and were named after the village or most prominent village they contained.

== List of korales ==
The following were the officially recognized divisions used in the 1911 Sri Lanka Census.

Province	District	Korales
Western	Colombo Municipality (Note: The Colombo Municipality, separate from the Districts, was divided into wards rather than korales.)	N/A
Western	Colombo	Alutkuru Korale South; Siyane Korale West; Siyane Korale East; Hewagam Korale; Colombo Mudaliyar's Division; Salpiti Korale Mudaliyar's Division
Western	Negombo (Note: Negombo District no longer exists.)	Alutkuru Korale North
Western	Kalutara	Rayigam Korale; Totamune Mudaliyar's Division; Pasdun Korale West; Pasdun Korale East
Central	Kandy	Udunuwara: Gangapalata Korale; Medapalata Korale; Kandupalata Korale; Yatinuwara: Gangawata Korale (Note: Gangawata Korale in Yatinuwara Divisional Secretariat later separated into the Kandy Four Gravets and Gangawata Korale Divisional Secretariat.); Medapalata Korale; Gangapalata Korale; Kandupalata Korale; Tumpane: Udapalata Korale; Pallepalata Korale; Ganatapalata Korale; Harispattu: Kulugammanasiya Pattu; Medasiya Pattu; Galasiya Pattu; Pallegampaha Korale; Udagampaha Korale; Patadumbara: Pallegampaha Korale; Udagampaha Korale; Palispattu East; Palispattu West; Wendaruwa Korale; Udadumbara: Udasiyapattu North; Udasiyapattu South; Medasiyapattu; Gampaha East; Gampaha West; Gandeke Korale; Kandapahala Korale; Pata Hewaheta: Gandahe Korale; Hewahissa Korale; Uda Palata: Kandukara Ihala Korale; Kandukara Pahala Korale; Ganga Ihala Korale; Ganga Pahala Korale; Uda Bulatgama: Pasbage Korale; Ambagamuwa Korale
Central	Matale	Matale South: Kohonsiya Pattu; Gampahasiya Pattuwa; Matale Udasiya Pattu; Matale Medasiya Pattu; Asgiri Udasiya Pattu; Asgiri Pallesiya Pattu; Matale North: Wagapanaha Pallesiya Pattu; Udugoda Pallesiya Pattu; Kandapalle Korale; Wagapanaha Udasiya Pattu; Inamalawa Korale; Udugoda Udasiya Pattu; Matale East: Matale Pallesiya Pattu; Ambanganga Korale; Laggala Udasiya Pattu; Laggala Pallesiya Pattu; Gangala Udasiya Pattu
Central	Nuwara Eliya	Kotmale Division: Pallepane Korale; Udapane Korale; Uda Hewaheta Division: Kohoka Korale; Gangapalata Korale; Diyatilaka Korale; Gannewa Korale; Pallegampaha Korale; Udagampaha Korale; Walapane Division: Oyapalata Korale; Medapalata Korale; Yatipalata Korale; Udapalata Korale
Northern	Jaffna	Valikamam East; Valikamam North; Valikamam West; Vadamaradchi West; Vadamaradchi East; Tenmaradchi; Pachchilaippali; Karaichchi; Punaryn-Tunukkai; Islands; Delft; Jaffna Division: Jaffna Local Board
Northern	Mannar	Mannar Island Division: Mannar East; Mannar West; Mantai Division: Mantai South; Mantai North; Perunkalippattu; Illuppaikadavaippattu; Panankamam; Metkumulai; Musali Division: Musali South; Musali North; Nanaddan West; Nanaddan East
Northern	Mullaitivu	Maritime Pattus: Karikkaddumulai North; Karikkaddumulai South; Mulliyavalai; Putukkudiyiruppu; Vavuniya North: Melpattu North; Karunavalpattu South; Melpattu East; Melpattu South; Udaiyaur; Vavuniya South: Kilakkumulai North; Kilakkumulai South; Naduchcheddikulam; Chinnachcheddikulam East; Chinnachcheddikulam West
Southern	Galle	Galle Municipality; Four Gravets; Bentota-Walallawiti Korale; Wellaboda Pattu; Gangaboda Pattu; Talpe Pattu; Hinidum Pattu
Southern	Matara	Four Gravets; Weligam Korale; Wellaboda Pattu; Gangaboda Pattu; Kandaboda Pattu; Morawak Korale
Southern	Hambantota	Magam Pattu; East Giruwa Pattu; West Giruwa Pattu
Eastern	Batticaloa	Manmunai Pattu North Manmunai Pattu South Bintenna Pattu Sammanturai Pattu Erravur and Koralai Pattus: Eravur Pattu; Koralai Pattu; Eruvil and Porativu Pattus: Eruvil Pattu; Porativu Pattu; Nindavur and Karaivaku Pattus: Nindavur Pattu; Karaivaku Pattu; Akkarai Pattu Panawa Pattu
Eastern	Trincomalee	Trincomalee Town Kadukkulam Pattu: Kadukkulam East; Kadukkulam West; Tambalagam Pattu Koddiyar Pattu
North Western	Kurunegala	Wanni Hatpattu: Mi-Oyen-Egoda Korale; Hatalispahe Korale East; Gantihe Korale; Pahalawisideke Korale; Katuwana Korale; Hatalispahe Korale West; Magul Medagandahaye Korale West; Magul Medagandahaye Korale East; Magul Otota Korale; Dewamedi Hatpattu: Walgam Pattu Korale; Udukaha Korale; Angamu Korale; Tissawa Korale; Giratalane Korale; Baladora Korale; Medagandahaye Korale; Dewamedi Korale; Hiriyaia Hatpattu: Ihalawisideke Korale; Hetahaye Korale; Ihala Otota Korale; Tittaweligandahaye Korale; Mahagalboda Egoda Korale; Diwigandahaye Korale; Nikawagampahe Korale; Weudawili Hatpattu: Hewawisse Korale; Tiragandahaye Korale; Kuda Galboda Korale; Gandahaye Korale; Madure Korale; Gannawe Korale; Weuda Korale; Mahagalboda Megoda Korale; Katugampola Hatpattu: Medapattu Korale East; Medapattu Korale West; Yatikahe Korale; Katugampola Korale South; Katugampola Korale North; Yagampattu Korale; Karandapattu Korale; Pitigal Korale; Meddeketiya Korale; Kiniyama Korale; Dambadeni Hatpattu: Udukaha Korale East; Udukaha Korale West; Udapola Otota Korale; Udapola Medalassa Korale; Rekkopattu Korale; Mayurawati Korale
North Western	Puttalam	Puttalam Local Board Puttalam Pattu Division: Puttalam Pattu; Akkarai Pattu South; Rajakumarawanni Pattu; Kalpitiya Division: Akkarai Pattu North; Pomparippu Pattu; Demala Hatpattu: Pandita Pattu; Kumara Pallam Pattuwa and Kumara Wanni Pattuwa; Pallam Pattuwa; Perawili Pattuwa; Karambe Pattuwa; Kirimetiya Pattuwa; Rajawanni Pattuwa
North Western	Chilaw (Note: Chilaw District is now a part of Puttalam District.)	Pitigal Korale North: Munnessaram Pattu; Anaivilundan Pattu; Pitigal Korale Central: Yagam Pattu; Yatakalam Pattu; Meda Palata; Pitigal Korale South: Kammal Pattu; Otara Palata
North Central	Anuradhapura	Nuwaragam Palata: Nuwaragam Korale; Kende Korale; Kanadara Korale; Kadawat Korale; Eppawala Korale; Wilachchiya Korale; Kalagam Palata: Unduruwa Korale; Negampaha Korale; Kiralawa Korale; Maminiya Korale; Kalagam Korale North; Kalagam Korale South; Hurulu Palata: Kalpe Korale; Kunchuttu Korale; Mahapotana Korale; Uddiyankulam Korale; Ulagalla Korale; Matombuwa Korale; Tamankaduwa Palata: Sinhala Pattu; Meda Pattu; Egoda Pattu
Uva	Badulla	Bintenna Division: Bintenna Korale; Aralupitiya Korale; Palwatta Korale; Wiyaluwa Division: Oyapalata Korale; Soranatota Korale; Wiyaluwa Korale; Udukinda Division: Gampaha Korale; Medapalata Korale; Yatipalata Korale; Udapalata Korale; Dehiwinipalata Korale; Dambawinipalata Korale; Mahapalata Korale; Yatikinda Division: Kumbalwela Korale; Bogoda Korale; Rilpola Korale; Passara Korale; Pattipola Korale; Wellassa Division: Wegampattu Korale; Nilgala Korale; Medagampattu Korale; Dambagalle Korale; Nikawetiya Korale; Mahawedirata Korale; Buttala Division: Buttala-Wedirata Korale; Kandukara Korale; Buttala Korale; Wellawaya Division: Sittaramapalata Korale; Kongala-Bintenna Korale; Wellawaya Korale; Kandapalle Korale
Sabaragamuwa	Ratnapura	Atakalan Korale: Meda Pattu; Pannil Pattu; Kandewel Pattu; Tambagam Pattu; Kollona Korale: Kolonnagam Pattu; Diyapotagam Pattu; Nawadun Korale: Uda Pattu; Meda Pattu; Palle Pattu; Kukul Korale: Uda Pattu; Meda Pattu; Palle Pattu; Kuruwiti Korale: Uda Pattu; Meda Pattuwa; Palle Pattu; Meda Korale: Hela-Uda Pattu; Helapalle Pattu; Kadawata Korale: Uduwagam Pattu; Talapitigam Pattu
Sabaragamuwa	Kegalle	Kegalla Local Board Galboda Korale: Ganne Pattuwa; Galboda Pattuwa; Tanipperru Pattuwa; Meda Pattuwa; Egodapota Pattuwa; Kinigoda Korale: Deyaladahamuna Pattuwa; Meddemediliya Pattuwa; Walgam Pattuwa; Paranakuru Korale: Mawata Pattuwa; Kanduaha Pattuwa; Tumpalata Pattuwa East; Tumpalata Pattu West; Beligal Korale: Gandolaha Pattuwa; Kandupita Pattuwa South; Kandupita Pattuwa North; Otara Pattuwa; Kiraweli Pattuwa East; Kiraweli Pattuwa West; Dehigampal Korale: Egodapota Pattuwa; Megodapota Pattuwa; Atulugam Korale East Atulugam Korale West Panawal Korale East Panawal Korale West Lower Bulatgama: Uduwa Palata; Kitulgal Palata

== See also ==
- Divisional Secretariats of Sri Lanka
