= Welapahala (Medadumbara) Grama Niladhari Division =

Welapahala
- Grama Niladhari Division
- Interactive map of Welapahala
- Coordinates: 7.213177°N 80.817881°E
- Country: Sri Lanka
- Province: Central Province
- District: Kandy District
- Divisional Secretariat: Medadumbara Divisional Secretariat
- Electoral District: Kandy Electoral District
- Polling Division: Teldeniya Polling Division

Area
  - Total: 7.38 km^{2} (2.85 sq mi)
- Elevation: 439 m (1,440 ft)

Population (2012)
  - Total: 261
  - Density: 35/km^{2} (91/sq mi)
- ISO 3166 code: LK-2124465

Welapahala

Welapahala Grama Niladhari Division is a Grama Niladhari Division of the Medadumbara Divisional Secretariat of Kandy District of Central Province, Sri Lanka. It has Grama Niladhari Division Code 822.

Welapahala is a surrounded by the Hilpenkandura, Bogahalanda, Hakuruthale, Meda Gammedda, Udagammedda and Thennalanda Grama Niladhari Divisions.

== Demographics ==
=== Ethnicity ===
The Welapahala Grama Niladhari Division has a Sinhalese majority (100.0%). In comparison, the Medadumbara Divisional Secretariat (which contains the Welapahala Grama Niladhari Division) has a Sinhalese majority (75.1%) and a significant Indian Tamil population (10.6%)

Ethnicity in Welapahala
1. Sinhalese (100.0%)
2. Other (0.00%)

=== Religion ===
The Welapahala Grama Niladhari Division has a Buddhist majority (100.0%). In comparison, the Medadumbara Divisional Secretariat (which contains the Welapahala Grama Niladhari Division) has a Buddhist majority (74.8%) and a significant Hindu population (16.2%)

Religion in Welapahala
1. Buddhist (100.0%)
2. Other (0.00%)
