= Palkumbura (Yatinuwara Divisional Secretariat) =

- Village
- Interactive map of Palkumbura
- Country: Sri Lanka
- Province: Central Province
- District: Kandy District
- Divisional secretariat: Harispattuwa
- Time zone: UTC+5:30 (Sri Lanka Standard Time)

Palkumbura is a village in Kandy District, Central Province, Sri Lanka. It is located within Harispattuwa Divisional Secretariat.

== History ==
Historically, Palkumbura was located in Medasiya Pattuwa in Harispattuwa. It was part of Kurundugolle-wasam, a grouping of villages—Kurundugolla, Walgama, and Palkumbura—governed by an arachchi—the arachchis of this wasam were Muslim.

== Demographics ==
Historical population
Year	Pop.	±%
1881	60	—
1891	60	+0.0%
1901	62	+3.3%
1911	85	+37.1%
1921	107	+25.9%

== See also ==
- List of towns in Central Province, Sri Lanka
