= Kurundugolla =

- Village
- Interactive map of Kurundugolla
- Country: Sri Lanka
- Province: Central Province
- District: Kandy District
- Divisional secretariat: Harispattuwa
- Time zone: UTC+5:30 (Sri Lanka Standard Time)

Kurundugolla is a village in Kandy District, Central Province, Sri Lanka. It is located in Harispattuwa Divisional Secretariat.

== History ==
Historically, Kurundugolla was located in Medasiya Pattuwa in Harispattuwa. It was part of Kurundugolle-wasam, a grouping of villages—Kurundugolla, Walgama, and Palkumbura—governed by an arachchi—the arachchis of this wasam were Muslim. The majority of the village has historically been Muslim.

== Demographics ==
Historical population
Year	Pop.	±%
1881	234	—
1891	154	−34.2%
1901	198	+28.6%
1911	252	+27.3%
1921	293	+16.3%

== See also ==
- List of towns in Central Province, Sri Lanka
