= Mahanuwara Grama Niladhari Division =

Mahanuwara
- Grama Niladhari Division
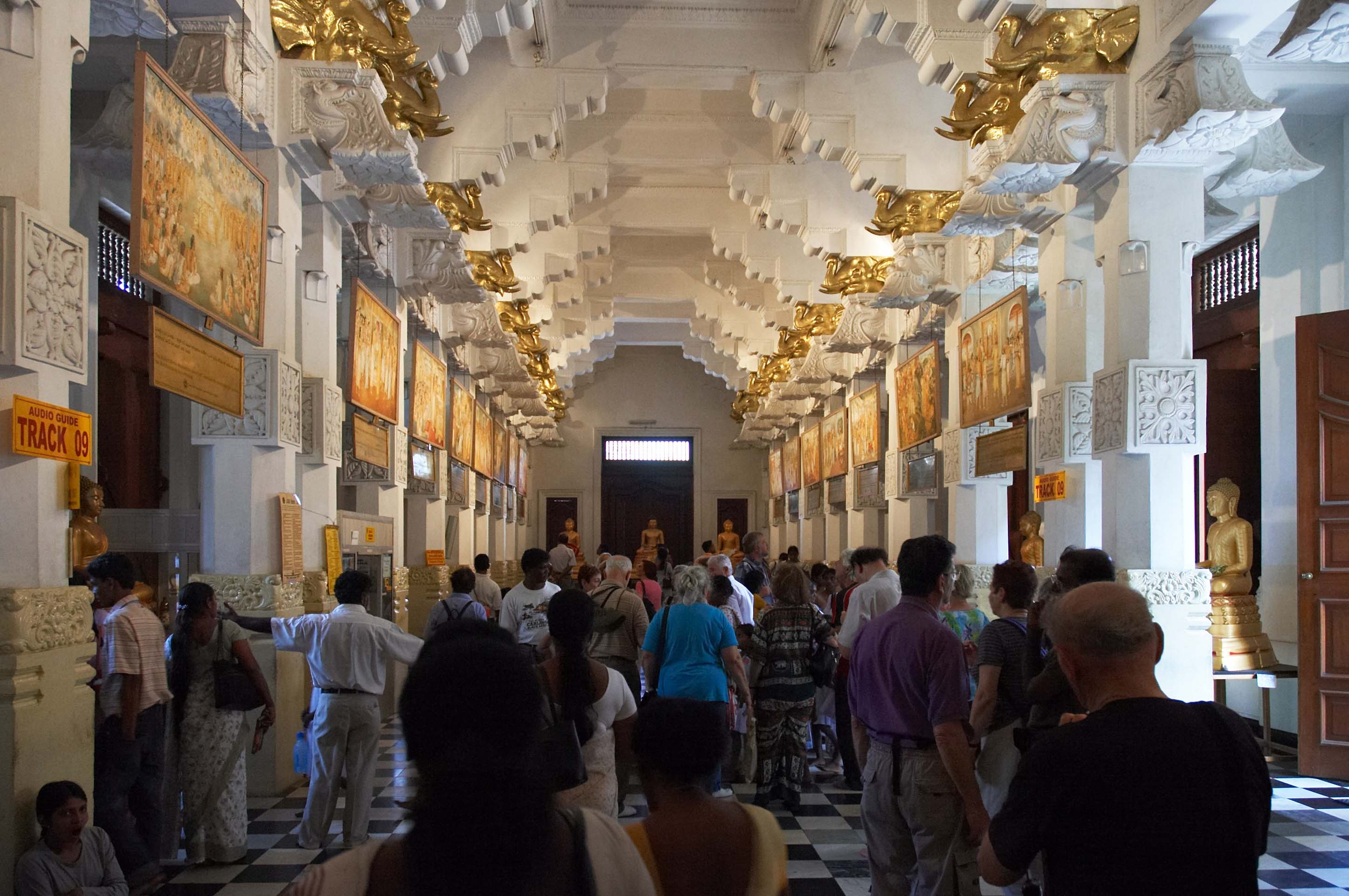
- ('Temple of the Tooth is located within, nearby or associated with the Mahanuwara Grama Niladhari Division',)
- Interactive map of Mahanuwara
- Coordinates: 7.295720°N 80.637860°E
- Country: Sri Lanka
- Province: Central Province
- District: Kandy District
- Divisional Secretariat: Kandy Four Gravets & Gangawata Korale Divisional Secretariat
- Electoral District: Kandy Electoral District
- Polling Division: Mahanuwara Polling Division

Area
  - Total: 0.57 km^{2} (0.22 sq mi)
- Elevation: 129 m (423 ft)

Population (2012)
  - Total: 2,012
  - Density: 3,530/km^{2} (9,100/sq mi)
- ISO 3166 code: LK-2130120

Mahanuwara

Mahanuwara Grama Niladhari Division is a Grama Niladhari Division of the Kandy Four Gravets & Gangawata Korale Divisional Secretariat of Kandy District of Central Province, Sri Lanka. It has Grama Niladhari Division Code 257.

Ehelepola Walauwa, Temple of the Tooth, Temple of the Tooth Museum, A9 road (Sri Lanka), St. Paul's Church, Kandy, Empire Hotel, Kandy, Giragama Walawwa, Queen's Hotel, Kandy, Roman Catholic Diocese of Kandy and Kandy are located within, nearby or associated with Mahanuwara.

Mahanuwara is a surrounded by the Asgiriya, Bogambara, Boowelikada, Ihala Katukele, Mahaiyawa and Malwatta Grama Niladhari Divisions.

== Demographics ==
=== Ethnicity ===
The Mahanuwara Grama Niladhari Division has a Sinhalese majority (58.2%), a significant Moor population (23.6%) and a significant Sri Lankan Tamil population (15.3%). In comparison, the Kandy Four Gravets & Gangawata Korale Divisional Secretariat (which contains the Mahanuwara Grama Niladhari Division) has a Sinhalese majority (74.6%) and a significant Moor population (10.9%)

Ethnicity in Mahanuwara
1. Sinhalese (58.2%)
2. Moor (23.6%)
3. Sri Lankan Tamil (15.3%)
4. Indian Tamil (1.90%)
5. Other (1.00%)

=== Religion ===
The Mahanuwara Grama Niladhari Division has a Buddhist plurality (49.6%), a significant Muslim population (26.2%) and a significant Hindu population (15.1%). In comparison, the Kandy Four Gravets & Gangawata Korale Divisional Secretariat (which contains the Mahanuwara Grama Niladhari Division) has a Buddhist majority (70.9%), a significant Muslim population (12.0%) and a significant Hindu population (10.2%)

Religion in Mahanuwara
1. Buddhist (49.6%)
2. Muslim (26.2%)
3. Hindu (15.1%)
4. Roman Catholic (4.90%)
5. Other Christian (4.20%)
6. Other (0.10%)

== Gallery ==
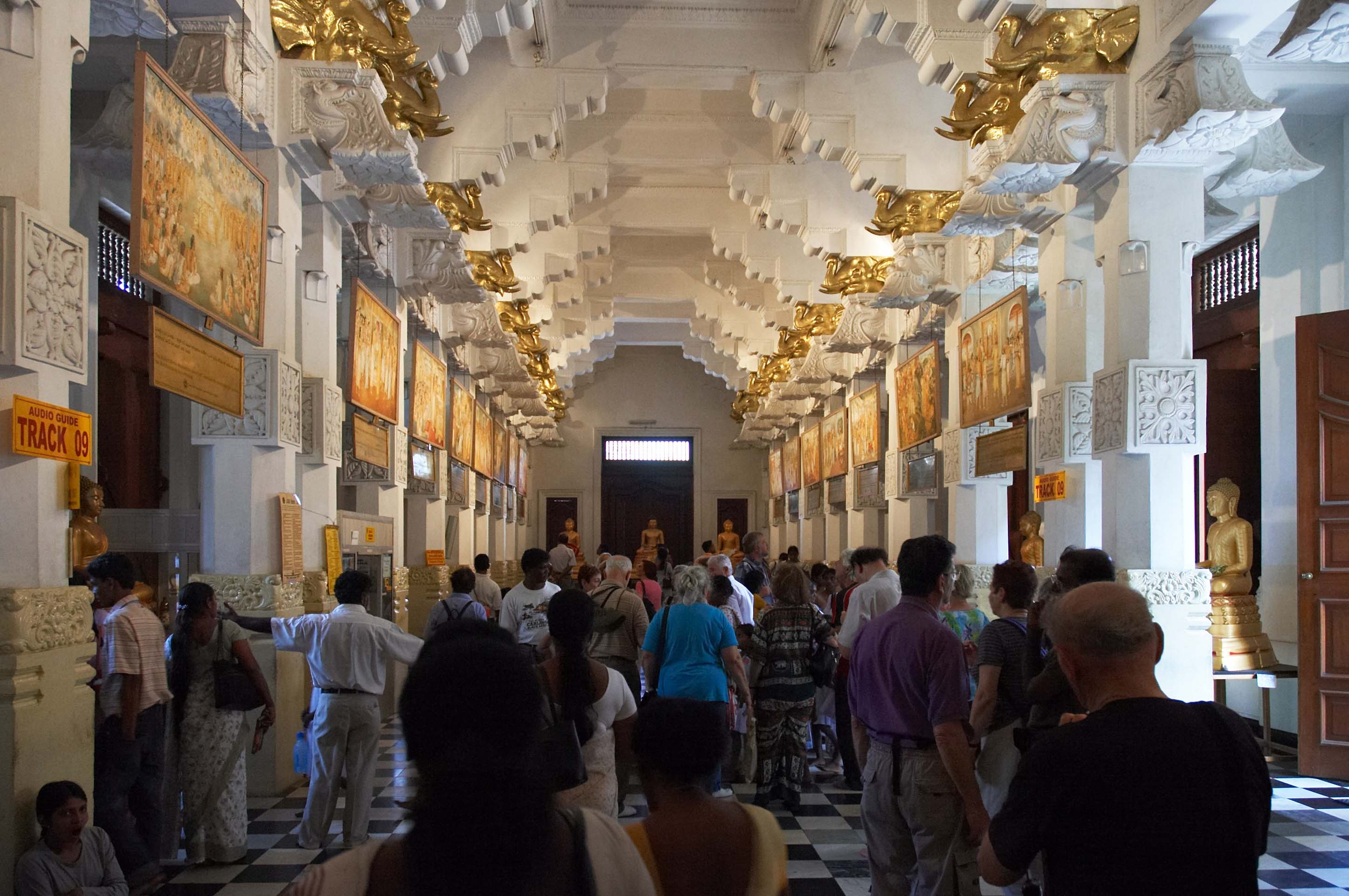
Temple of the Tooth

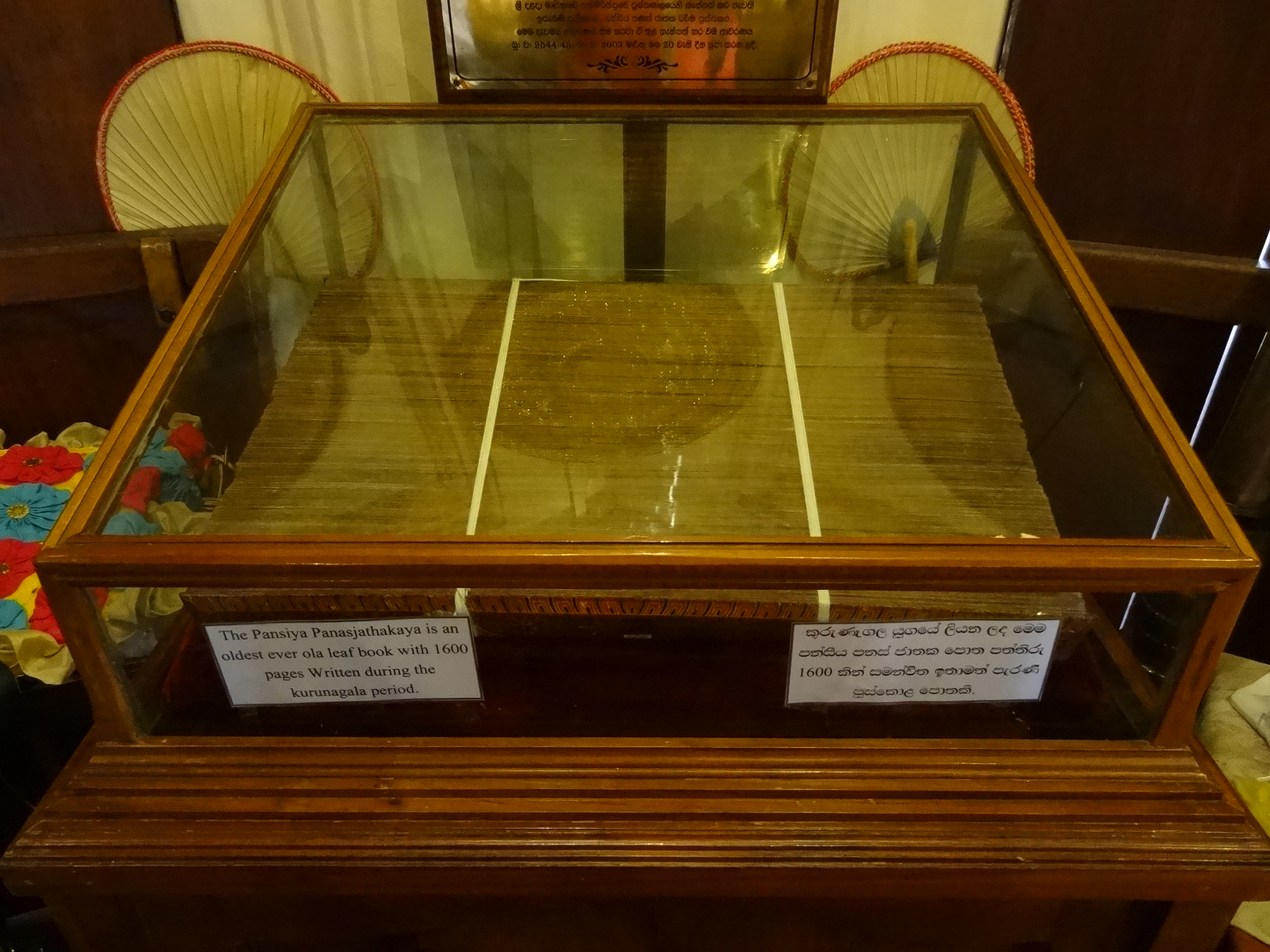
Temple of the Tooth Museum

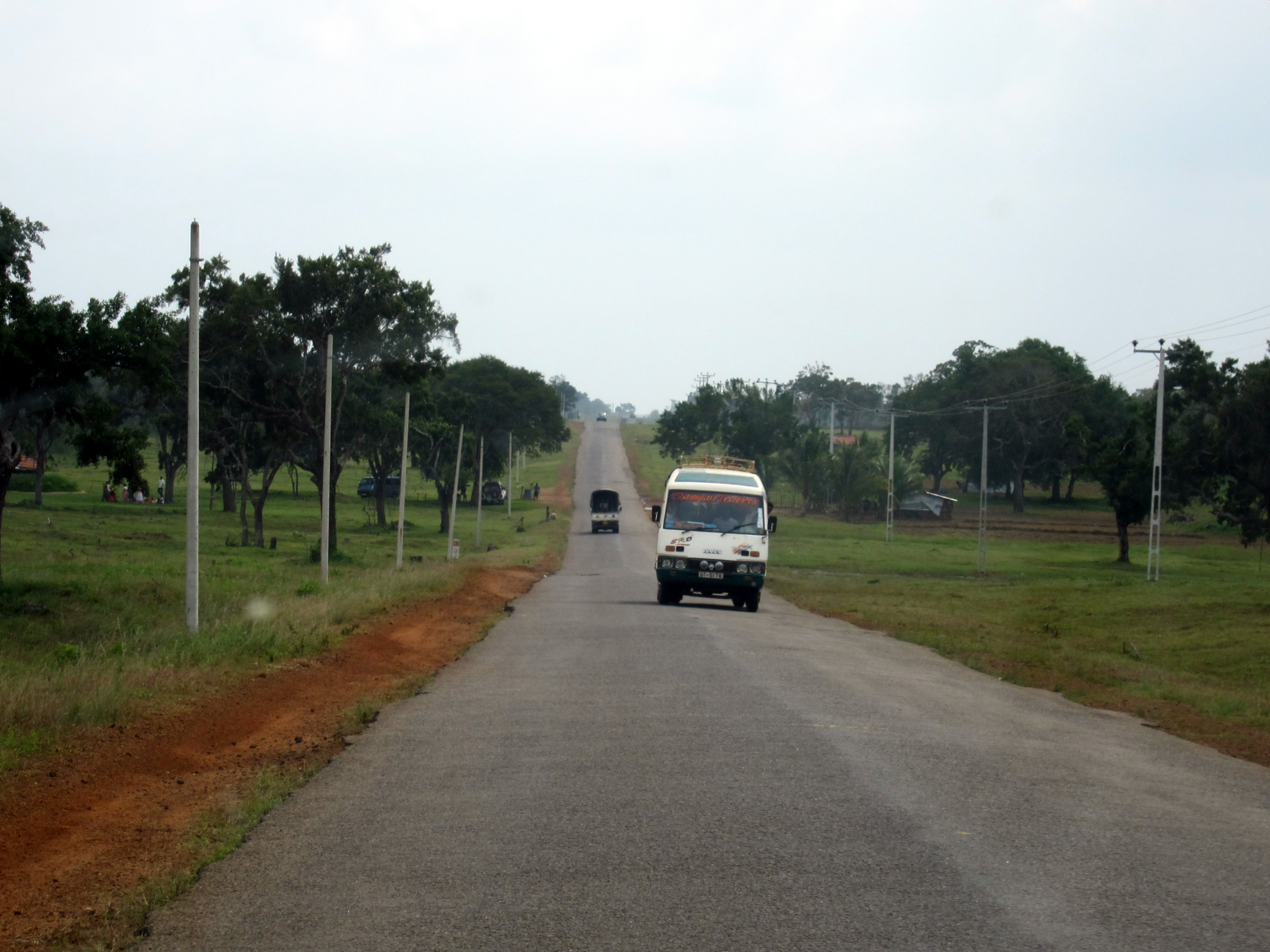
A9 road (Sri Lanka)

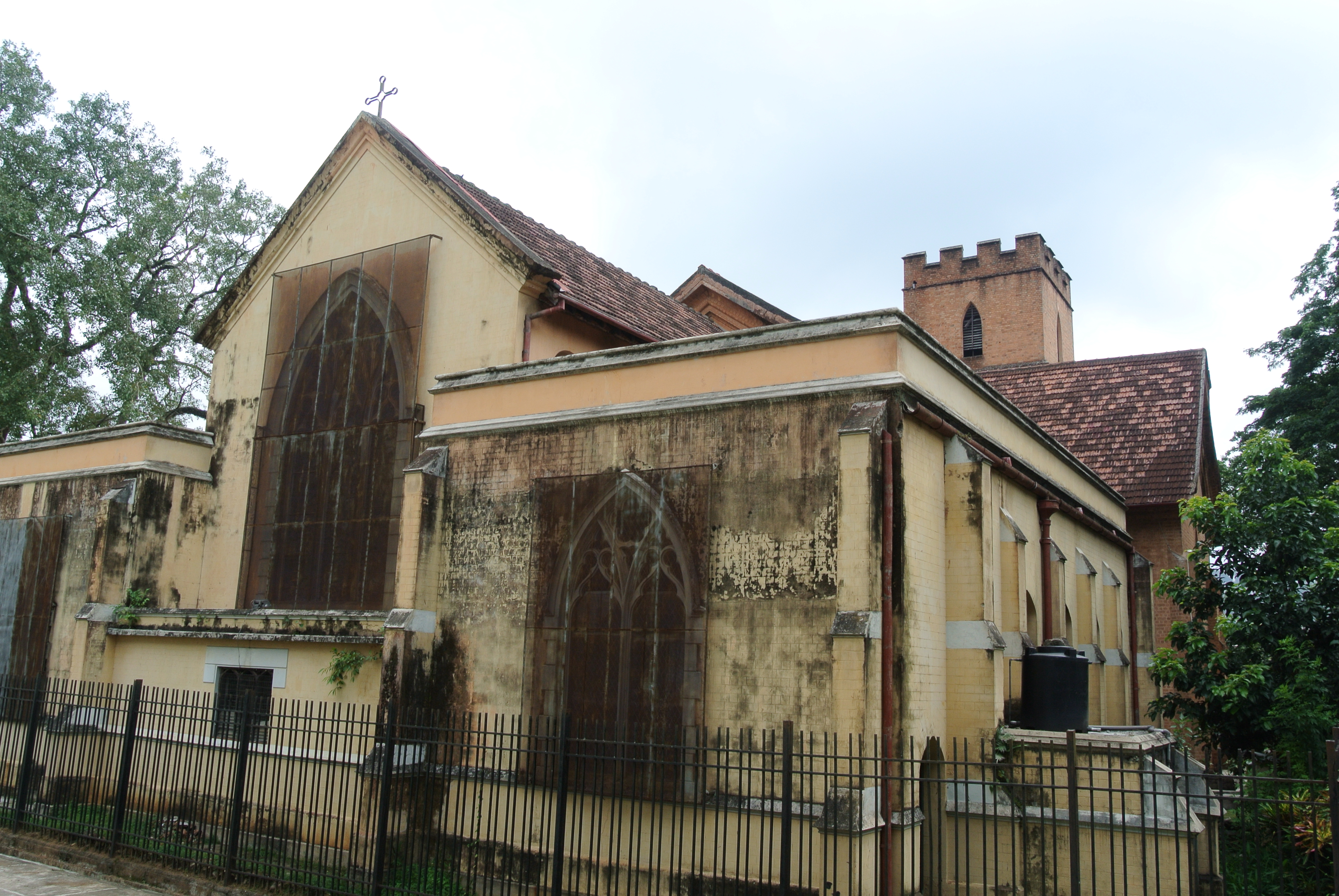
St. Paul's Church, Kandy

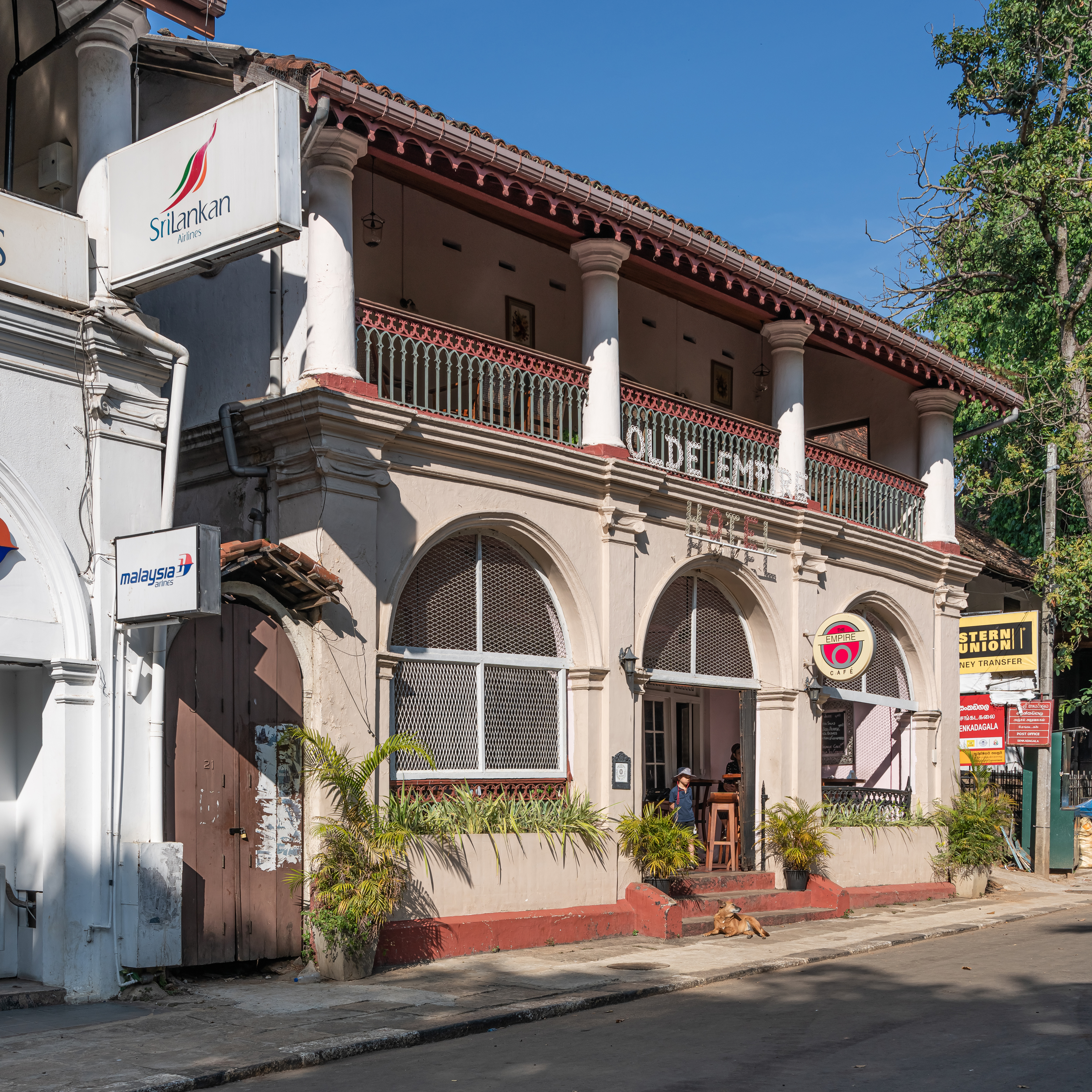
Empire Hotel, Kandy

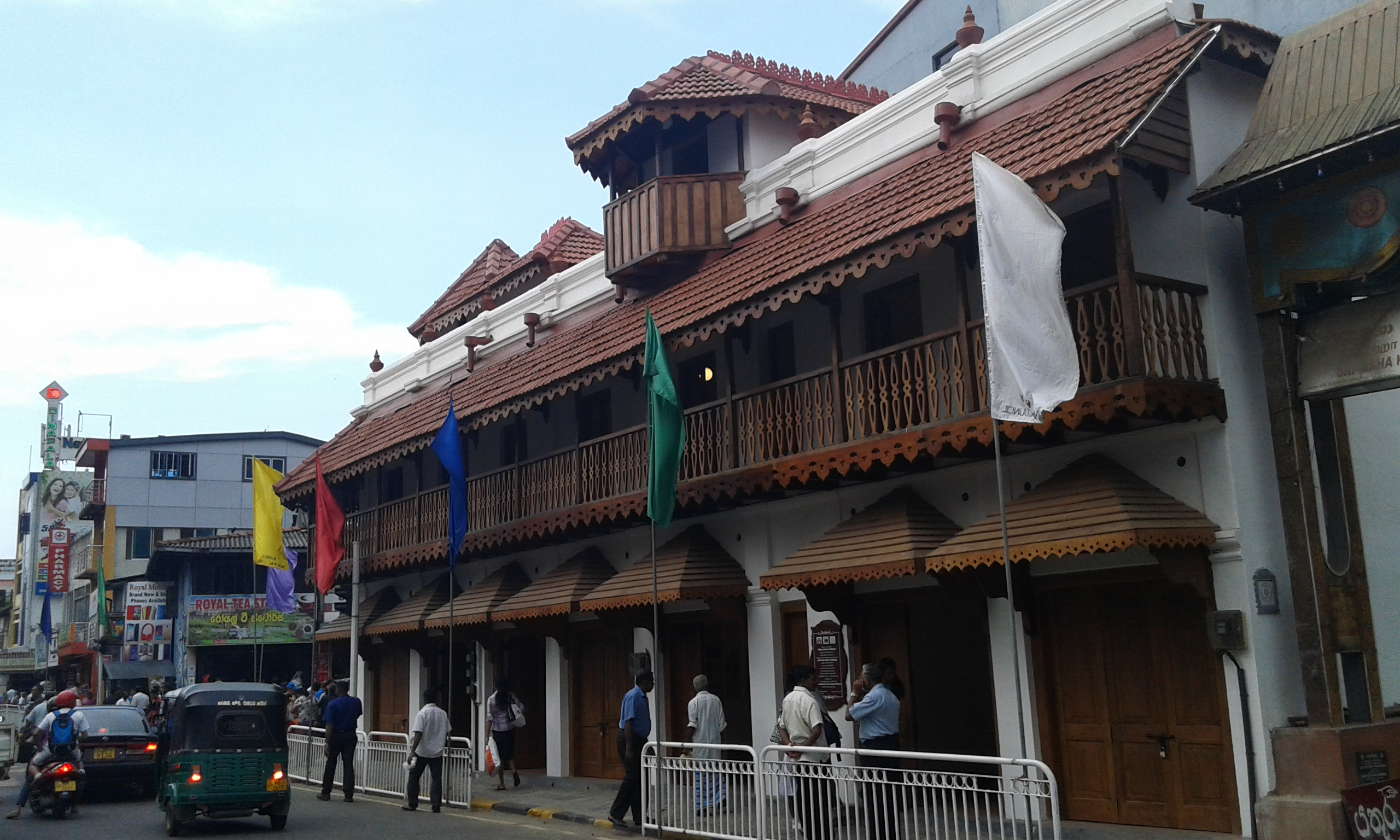
Giragama Walawwa

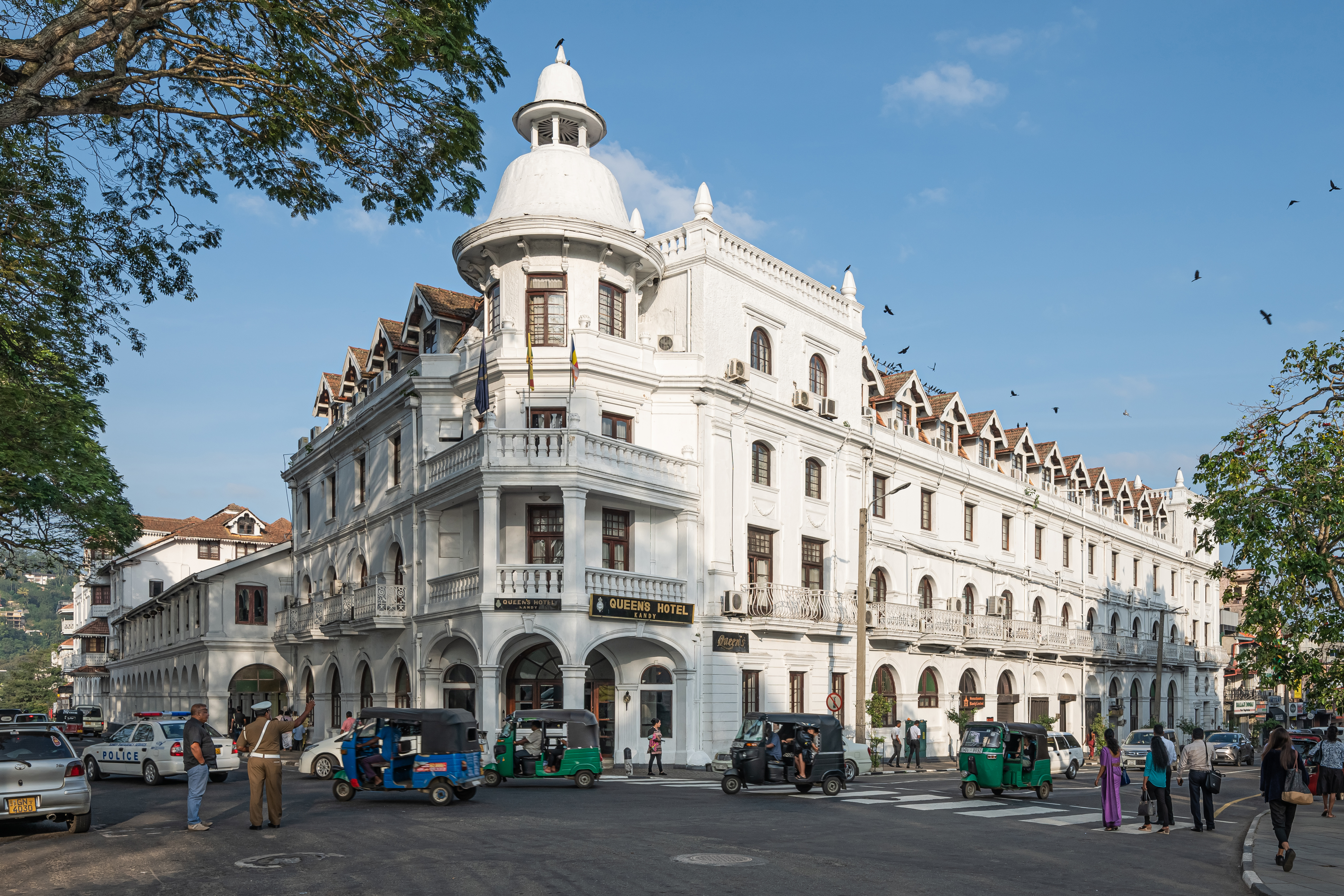
Queen's Hotel, Kandy

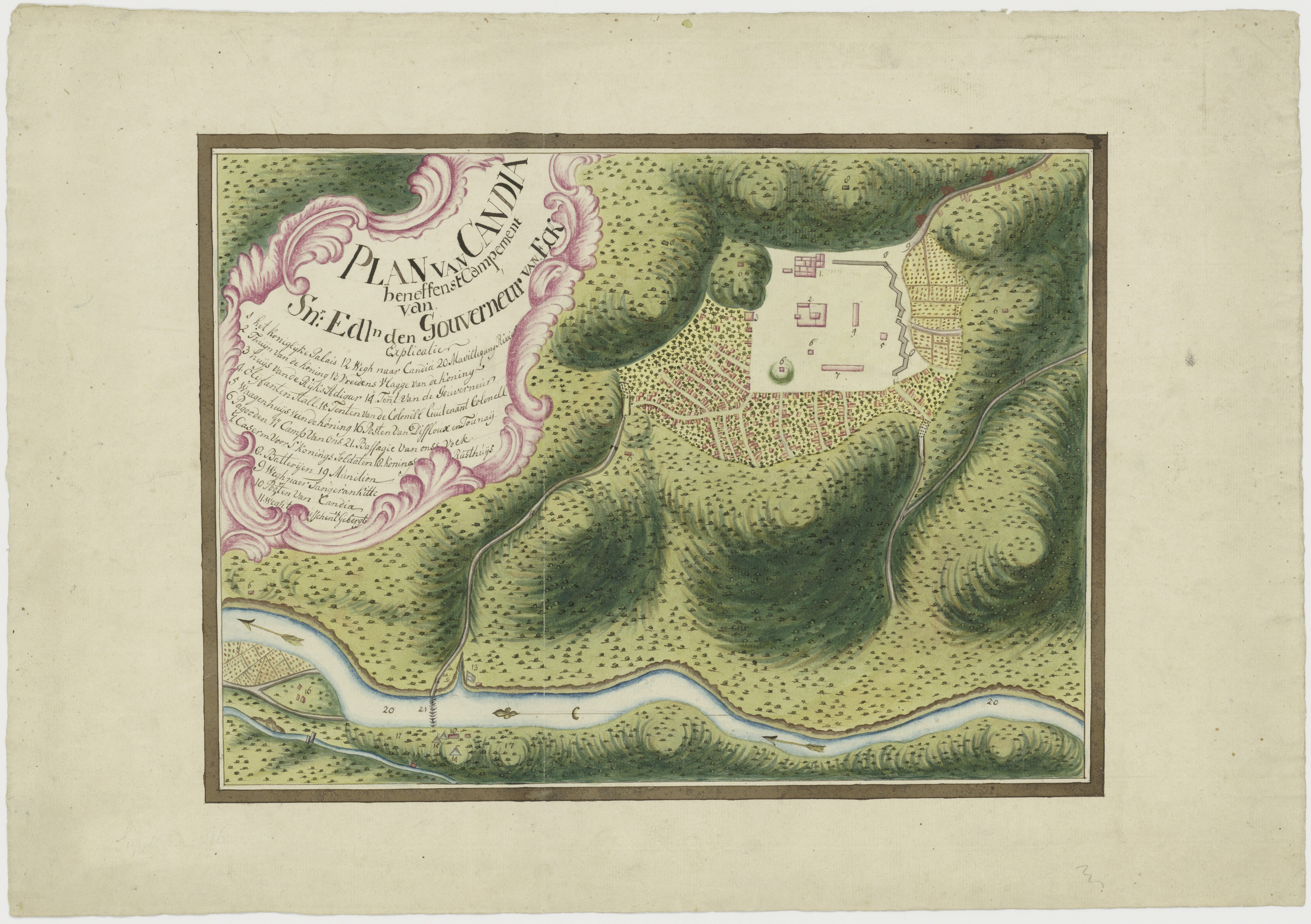
Kandy
