= Gampola East Grama Niladhari Division =

Gampola East
- Grama Niladhari Division
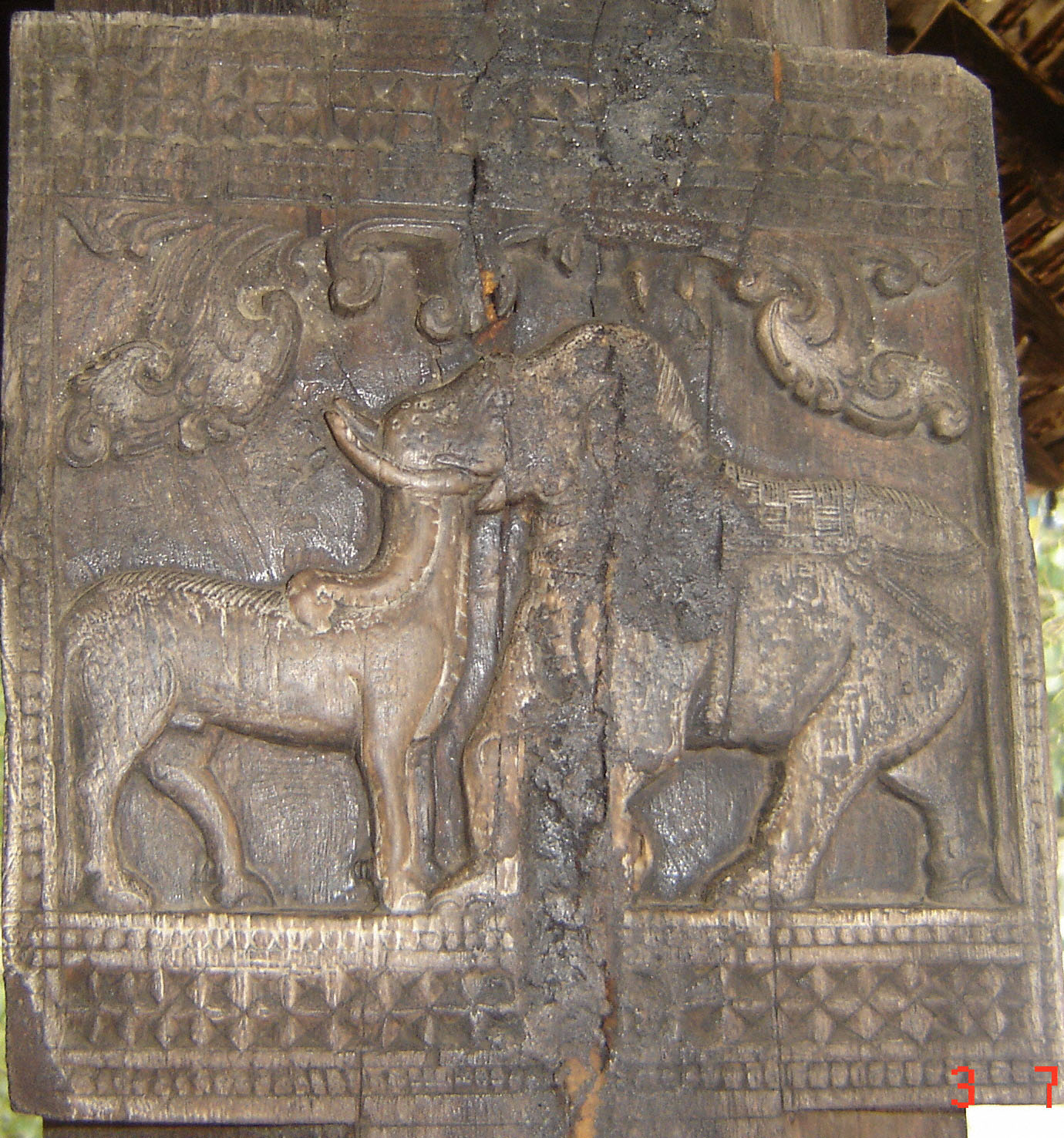
- Gampola is located within, nearby or associated with the Gampola East Grama Niladhari Division
- Interactive map of Gampola East
- Coordinates: 7.172140°N 80.575594°E
- Country: Sri Lanka
- Province: Central Province
- District: Kandy District
- Divisional Secretariat: Udapalatha Divisional Secretariat
- Electoral District: Kandy Electoral District
- Polling Division: Nawalapitiya Polling Division

Area
  - Total: 0.32 km^{2} (0.12 sq mi)
- Elevation: 487 m (1,598 ft)

Population (2012)
  - Total: 2,758
  - Density: 8,619/km^{2} (22,320/sq mi)
- ISO 3166 code: LK-2151065

Gampola East

Gampola East Grama Niladhari Division is a Grama Niladhari Division of the Udapalatha Divisional Secretariat of Kandy District of Central Province, Sri Lanka. It has Grama Niladhari Division Code 1108.

Gampola are located within, nearby or associated with Gampola East.

Gampola East is a surrounded by the Bothalapitiya, Illawathura, Polkumbura, Unambuwa, Ilangawatta, Kahatapitiya and Ilangawatta Grama Niladhari Divisions.

== Demographics ==
=== Ethnicity ===
The Gampola East Grama Niladhari Division has a Moor majority (86.9%). In comparison, the Udapalatha Divisional Secretariat (which contains the Gampola East Grama Niladhari Division) has a Sinhalese majority (55.9%), a significant Moor population (22.0%) and a significant Indian Tamil population (13.5%)

Ethnicity in Gampola East
1. Moor (86.9%)
2. Sinhalese (8.80%)
3. Sri Lankan Tamil (2.50%)
4. Other (1.80%)

=== Religion ===
The Gampola East Grama Niladhari Division has a Muslim majority (87.6%). In comparison, the Udapalatha Divisional Secretariat (which contains the Gampola East Grama Niladhari Division) has a Buddhist majority (55.0%), a significant Muslim population (22.7%) and a significant Hindu population (19.5%)

Religion in Gampola East
1. Muslim (87.6%)
2. Buddhist (9.00%)
3. Hindu (2.60%)
4. Other (0.80%)

== Gallery ==
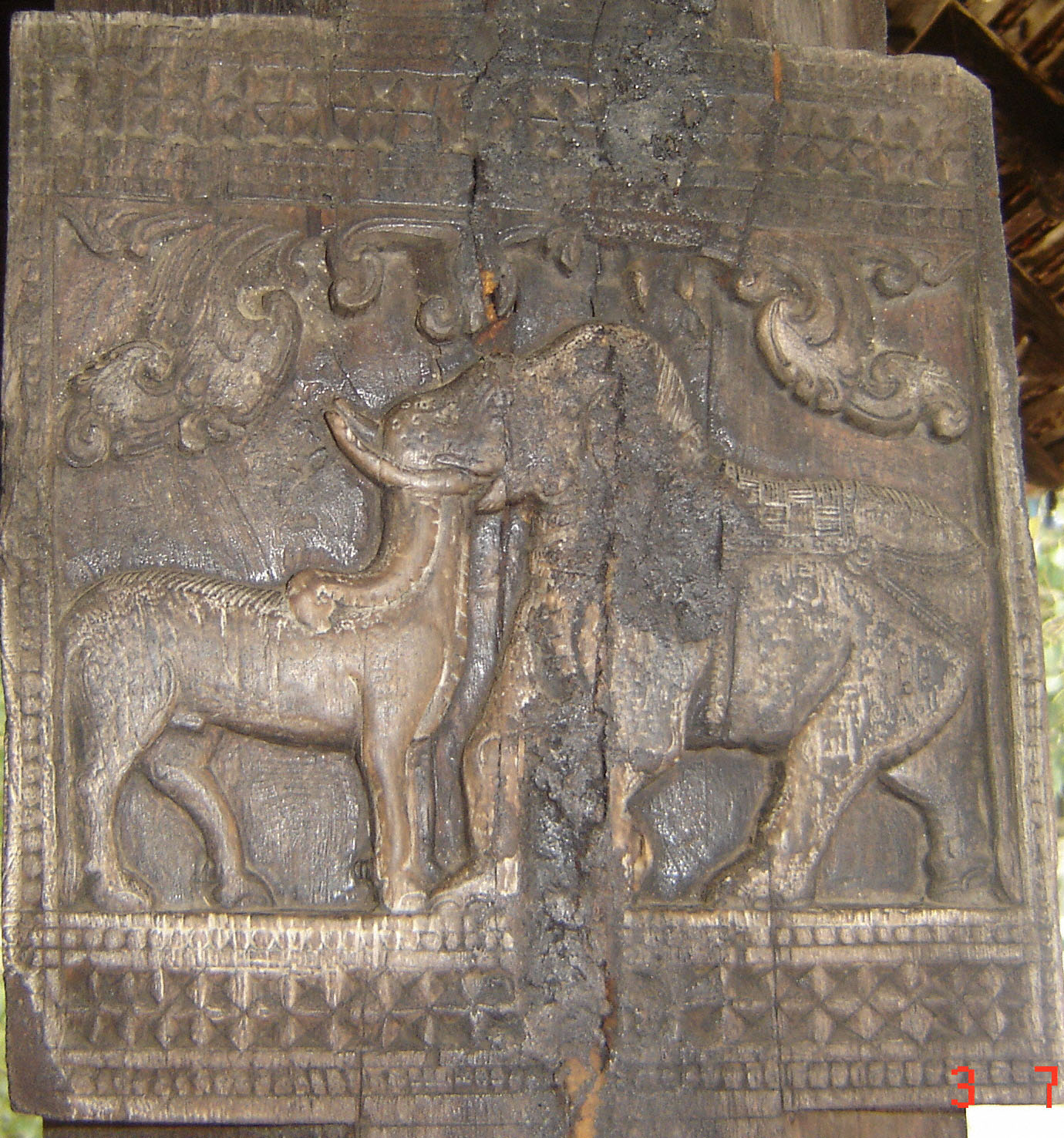
Gampola
