= Palletalawinna =

- Village
- Location of Palletalawinna in Sri Lanka
- Coordinates: 7.3388°N 80.6396°E
- Country: Sri Lanka
- Province: Central Province
- District: Kandy District
- Elevation: 465.58 m (1,527.5 ft)
- Time zone: UTC+5:30 (Sri Lanka Standard Time)

Palletalawinna, also known as Pallethalawinna, is a village in Sri Lanka. It is located 8.5 km (5.3 mi) north of Kandy, within the Central Province. It is administered by the Kandy Municipal Council and falls within the Pathadumbara Divisional Secretariat.

== 2001 massacre ==
It was the site of the murder of ten supporters of the Sri Lanka Muslim Congress on 5 December 2001. It was the worst single act of electoral violence in the country. It was alleged that the perpetrators of the attack, were connected to the Minister of Power and Energy and Deputy Defence Minister, Anuruddha Ratwatte. In January 2006 Ratwatte and his two sons were acquitted of all charges in the Palletalawinna massacre. Five army personnel were sentenced to death for the massacre.

== Transport ==
The village is serviced by the Palle Thalawinna railway station, the sixth station on the Matale line (sometimes referred to as the Kandy line), from the Kandy railway station. The station was established in 2009.

== See also ==
- List of towns in Central Province, Sri Lanka
