= Pattapola Ihala Grama Niladhari Division =

Pattapola Ihala
- Grama Niladhari Division
- Interactive map of Pattapola Ihala
- Coordinates: 7.315713°N 80.489986°E
- Country: Sri Lanka
- Province: Central Province
- District: Kandy District
- Divisional Secretariat: Hatharaliyadda Divisional Secretariat
- Electoral District: Kandy Electoral District
- Polling Division: Galagedara Polling Division

Area
  - Total: 2.35 km^{2} (0.91 sq mi)
- Elevation: 278 m (912 ft)

Population (2012)
  - Total: 547
  - Density: 233/km^{2} (600/sq mi)
- ISO 3166 code: LK-2134245

Pattapola Ihala

Pattapola Ihala Grama Niladhari Division is a Grama Niladhari Division of the Hatharaliyadda Divisional Secretariat of Kandy District of Central Province, Sri Lanka. It has Grama Niladhari Division Code 342.

Pattapola Ihala is a surrounded by the Kirimetiya Watta, Thismada, Alagalla Pahalagama, Andiyathenna, Pattapola Pahalagama, Mudagammana, Meegasthenna and Welivita Pahalagama South Grama Niladhari Divisions.

== Demographics ==
=== Ethnicity ===
The Pattapola Ihala Grama Niladhari Division has a Sinhalese majority (97.1%). In comparison, the Hatharaliyadda Divisional Secretariat (which contains the Pattapola Ihala Grama Niladhari Division) has a Sinhalese majority (92.9%)

Ethnicity in Pattapola Ihala
1. Sinhalese (97.1%)
2. Indian Tamil (1.80%)
3. Sri Lankan Tamil (1.10%)
4. Other (0.00%)

=== Religion ===
The Pattapola Ihala Grama Niladhari Division has a Buddhist majority (100.0%). In comparison, the Hatharaliyadda Divisional Secretariat (which contains the Pattapola Ihala Grama Niladhari Division) has a Buddhist majority (92.9%)

Religion in Pattapola Ihala
1. Buddhist (100.0%)
2. Other (0.00%)
