= Scots Kirk, Kandy =

Presbyterian Church, Kandy
- Scots Kirk
- Location within Sri Lanka
- 7°17′46″N 80°38′14″E
- Location: 127 D. S. Senanayake Street, Kandy, Sri Lanka
- Denomination: Church of Scotland
- Website: https://scotskirk.lk/

History
- Status: Church
- Founded: 1845; 181 years ago

Architecture
- Functional status: Active
- Architectural type: Gothic

Administration
- Diocese: International Presbytery

Clergy
- Priest: Saman Perera

Archaeological Protected Monument of Sri Lanka
- Designated: 8 July 2005

Scots Kirk (Sinhala: ස්කොට්ලන්ත කර්ක්) or Presbyterian Church, Kandy, is Presbyterian church, located at 127 D. S. Senanayake Street (formerly Trincomalee Street), Kandy.

The church was established by the Church of Scotland in 1845. The construction of the church was funded from donations collected by Scottish planters and managers from surrounding coffee estates.

Robert Smith was the chaplain of Scots Kirk from 1856 and was replaced by George Washington Sprott, who served from 1857 to 1864. Sprott was succeeded by John Watt, who was followed by Edmond Steuart Russell, the chaplain from 1903 to 1909 and then John Faulds from 1909 to 1920. The chaplain from 1927 to ?? was John Macara.

On 15 April 1863 the church combined with St. Andrew's Scots Kirk in Colombo, to form the Presbytery of Ceylon. In 1954 both churches formed the Presbytery of Lanka. The Scots Kirk continues to operate as part of the Church of Scotland, under the jurisdiction of the International Presbytery.

On 8 July 2005 it was formally included as an 'Archaeological Protected Monument' by the government.

== See also ==
- Protestantism in Sri Lanka
