= Doluwa Divisional Secretariat =

- Divisional Secretariat
- Interactive map of Doluwa Divisional Secretariat
- Coordinates: 7.1743°N 80.6399°E
- Country: Sri Lanka
- Province: Central Province
- District: Kandy District

Area
  - Total: 37 sq mi (95 km^{2})

Population (2024)
  - Total: 52,784
  - Density: 1,440/sq mi (556/km^{2})
- Time zone: UTC+5:30 (Sri Lanka Standard Time)

Doluwa Divisional Secretariat is a Divisional Secretariat of Kandy District, of Central Province, Sri Lanka.

== Demography-Religion ==
Religion in Doluwa DS Division (2012)
1. Buddhist (73.6%)
2. Hindu (18.6%)
3. Muslim (5.30%)
4. Roman Catholic (1.20%)
5. Other Christian (1.30%)
6. Other (0.00%)
