= Ganga Ihala Korale Divisional Secretariat =

- Divisional Secretariat
- Interactive map of Ganga Ihala Korale Divisional Secretariat
- Country: Sri Lanka
- Province: Central Province
- District: Kandy District
- Established: 1971

Government
  - Divisional Secretary: K. G. Lenarol

Area
  - Total: 94 km^{2} (36 sq mi)

Population (2024)
  - Total: 59,145
  - Density: 629.19/km^{2} (1,629.6/sq mi)
- Time zone: UTC+5:30 (Sri Lanka Standard Time)

Ganga Ihala Korale Divisional Secretariat is a Divisional Secretariat of Kandy District, of Central Province, Sri Lanka.

Religion in Ganga Ihala Korale DS Division (2012)
1. Buddhist (80.3%)
2. Hindu (11.3%)
3. Muslim (6.84%)
4. Roman Catholic (0.88%)
5. Other Christian (0.69%)
6. Other (0.03%)
