= Nawalapitiya Polling Division =

Nawalapitiya
- Polling Division
- Coordinates: 7.086327°N 80.554722°E
- Country: Sri Lanka
- Province: Central Province, Sri Lanka
- Electoral District: Kandy Electoral District

Area
  - Total: 303.23 km^{2} (117.08 sq mi)

Population (2012)
  - Total: 206,887
  - Density: 682/km^{2} (1,770/sq mi)
- ISO 3166 code: EC-04M

The Nawalapitiya Polling Division is a Polling Division in the Kandy Electoral District, in the Central Province, Sri Lanka.

== Presidential Election Results ==
=== Summary ===
The winner of Nawalapitiya has matched the final country result 6 out of 8 times. Hence, Nawalapitiya is a Weak Bellwether for Presidential Elections.

Year	Nawalapitiya	Kandy Electoral District	MAE %	Sri Lanka	MAE %
2019	NDF	SLPP	4.81%	SLPP	6.86%
2015	NDF	NDF	0.28%	NDF	3.23%
2010	UPFA	UPFA	3.15%	UPFA	0.54%
2005	UNP	UNP	3.85%	UPFA	2.03%
1999	PA	PA	4.35%	PA	2.89%
1994	PA	PA	0.34%	PA	5.24%
1988	UNP	UNP	4.27%	UNP	7.11%
1982	UNP	UNP	2.48%	UNP	6.99%
Matches/Mean MAE	6/8	7/8	2.94%	8/8	4.36%

=== 2019 Sri Lankan Presidential Election ===
Party	Nawalapitiya		Kandy Electoral District		Sri Lanka	
Party	Votes	%	Votes	%	Votes	%
NDF	39,887	49.51%	417,355	44.64%	5,564,239	41.99%
SLPP	36,436	45.22%	471,502	50.43%	6,924,255	52.25%
Other Parties (with < 1%)	2,504	3.11%	22,479	2.40%	345,452	2.61%
NMPP	1,740	2.16%	23,539	2.52%	418,553	3.16%
Valid Votes	80,567	98.74%	934,875	99.04%	13,252,499	98.99%
Rejected Votes	1,030	1.26%	9,020	0.96%	135,452	1.01%
Total Polled	81,597	84.42%	943,895	84.89%	13,387,951	83.71%
Registered Electors	96,659		1,111,860		15,992,568	

=== 2015 Sri Lankan Presidential Election ===
Party	Nawalapitiya		Kandy Electoral District		Sri Lanka	
Party	Votes	%	Votes	%	Votes	%
NDF	40,233	54.25%	466,994	54.56%	6,217,162	51.28%
UPFA	32,619	43.98%	378,585	44.23%	5,768,090	47.58%
Other Parties (with < 1%)	1,310	1.77%	10,329	1.21%	138,200	1.14%
Valid Votes	74,162	98.16%	855,908	98.73%	12,123,452	98.85%
Rejected Votes	1,393	1.84%	10,993	1.27%	140,925	1.15%
Total Polled	75,555	79.06%	866,901	79.71%	12,264,377	78.69%
Registered Electors	95,567		1,087,542		15,585,942	

=== 2010 Sri Lankan Presidential Election ===
Party	Nawalapitiya		Kandy Electoral District		Sri Lanka	
Party	Votes	%	Votes	%	Votes	%
UPFA	35,555	57.05%	406,636	54.16%	6,015,934	57.88%
NDF	25,107	40.29%	329,492	43.89%	4,173,185	40.15%
Other Parties (with < 1%)	1,658	2.66%	14,658	1.95%	204,494	1.97%
Valid Votes	62,320	98.31%	750,786	98.85%	10,393,613	99.03%
Rejected Votes	1,069	1.69%	8,700	1.15%	101,838	0.97%
Total Polled	63,389	74.46%	759,486	75.87%	10,495,451	66.70%
Registered Electors	85,136		1,001,074		15,734,587	

=== 2005 Sri Lankan Presidential Election ===
Party	Nawalapitiya		Kandy Electoral District		Sri Lanka	
Party	Votes	%	Votes	%	Votes	%
UNP	29,882	50.26%	387,150	54.33%	4,706,366	48.43%
UPFA	28,544	48.01%	315,672	44.30%	4,887,152	50.29%
Other Parties (with < 1%)	1,027	1.73%	9,798	1.37%	123,521	1.27%
Valid Votes	59,453	98.40%	712,620	98.64%	9,717,039	98.88%
Rejected Votes	965	1.60%	9,817	1.36%	109,869	1.12%
Total Polled	60,418	75.52%	722,437	77.37%	9,826,908	69.51%
Registered Electors	80,003		933,754		14,136,979	

=== 1999 Sri Lankan Presidential Election ===
Party	Nawalapitiya		Kandy Electoral District		Sri Lanka	
Party	Votes	%	Votes	%	Votes	%
PA	28,277	54.78%	308,187	50.29%	4,312,157	51.12%
UNP	20,885	40.46%	276,360	45.10%	3,602,748	42.71%
JVP	1,353	2.62%	15,512	2.53%	343,927	4.08%
Other Parties (with < 1%)	1,107	2.14%	12,752	2.08%	176,679	2.09%
Valid Votes	51,622	97.15%	612,811	97.29%	8,435,754	97.69%
Rejected Votes	1,513	2.85%	17,060	2.71%	199,536	2.31%
Total Polled	53,135	76.90%	629,871	77.61%	8,635,290	72.17%
Registered Electors	69,098		811,606		11,965,536	

=== 1994 Sri Lankan Presidential Election ===
Party	Nawalapitiya		Kandy Electoral District		Sri Lanka	
Party	Votes	%	Votes	%	Votes	%
PA	26,785	56.98%	320,110	56.64%	4,709,205	62.28%
UNP	19,423	41.32%	235,519	41.68%	2,715,283	35.91%
Other Parties (with < 1%)	799	1.70%	9,488	1.68%	137,040	1.81%
Valid Votes	47,007	96.89%	565,117	97.55%	7,561,526	98.03%
Rejected Votes	1,509	3.11%	14,179	2.45%	151,706	1.97%
Total Polled	48,516	77.01%	579,296	77.85%	7,713,232	69.12%
Registered Electors	62,996		744,151		11,158,880	

=== 1988 Sri Lankan Presidential Election ===
Party	Nawalapitiya		Kandy Electoral District		Sri Lanka	
Party	Votes	%	Votes	%	Votes	%
UNP	24,203	59.26%	234,124	54.88%	2,569,199	50.43%
SLFP	16,082	39.37%	186,187	43.65%	2,289,857	44.95%
SLMP	559	1.37%	6,266	1.47%	235,701	4.63%
Valid Votes	40,844	98.74%	426,577	98.57%	5,094,754	98.24%
Rejected Votes	521	1.26%	6,167	1.43%	91,499	1.76%
Total Polled	41,365	76.59%	432,744	68.36%	5,186,256	55.87%
Registered Electors	54,010		633,030		9,283,143	

=== 1982 Sri Lankan Presidential Election ===
Party	Nawalapitiya		Kandy Electoral District		Sri Lanka	
Party	Votes	%	Votes	%	Votes	%
UNP	24,586	62.32%	289,621	59.80%	3,450,815	52.93%
SLFP	13,512	34.25%	178,647	36.89%	2,546,348	39.05%
JVP	961	2.44%	12,493	2.58%	273,428	4.19%
Other Parties (with < 1%)	394	1.00%	3,536	0.73%	249,460	3.83%
Valid Votes	39,453	98.97%	484,297	99.07%	6,520,156	98.78%
Rejected Votes	411	1.03%	4,548	0.93%	80,470	1.22%
Total Polled	39,864	84.02%	488,845	89.44%	6,600,626	80.15%
Registered Electors	47,445		546,565		8,235,358	

== Parliamentary Election Results ==
=== Summary ===
The winner of Nawalapitiya has matched the final country result 4 out of 7 times. Hence, Nawalapitiya is a Weak Bellwether for Parliamentary Elections.

Year	Nawalapitiya	Kandy Electoral District	MAE %	Sri Lanka	MAE %
2015	UNP	UNP	0.59%	UNP	6.60%
2010	UPFA	UPFA	12.60%	UPFA	10.78%
2004	UNP	UNP	1.63%	UPFA	5.54%
2001	PA	UNP	9.38%	UNP	6.24%
2000	PA	PA	9.35%	PA	9.74%
1994	UNP	UNP	2.61%	PA	7.34%
1989	UNP	UNP	2.15%	UNP	7.43%
Matches/Mean MAE	4/7	5/7	5.47%	7/7	7.67%

=== 2015 Sri Lankan Parliamentary Election ===
Party	Nawalapitiya		Kandy Electoral District		Sri Lanka	
Party	Votes	%	Votes	%	Votes	%
UNP	37,611	56.12%	440,761	55.61%	5,098,916	45.77%
UPFA	25,672	38.31%	309,152	39.00%	4,732,664	42.48%
JVP	2,157	3.22%	30,669	3.87%	544,154	4.88%
Other Parties (with < 1%)	855	1.28%	7,655	0.97%	82,981	0.74%
CWC	719	1.07%	4,400	0.56%	17,107	0.15%
Valid Votes	67,014	92.82%	792,637	95.48%	11,140,333	95.35%
Rejected Votes	5,101	7.07%	37,065	4.46%	516,926	4.42%
Total Polled	72,200	75.55%	830,165	79.13%	11,684,111	77.66%
Registered Electors	95,567		1,049,160		15,044,490	

=== 2010 Sri Lankan Parliamentary Election ===
Party	Nawalapitiya		Kandy Electoral District		Sri Lanka	
Party	Votes	%	Votes	%	Votes	%
UPFA	38,153	74.76%	339,819	60.81%	4,846,388	60.38%
UNP	11,648	22.82%	192,798	34.50%	2,357,057	29.37%
DNA	1,128	2.21%	23,728	4.25%	441,251	5.50%
Other Parties (with < 1%)	108	0.21%	2,459	0.44%	30,354	0.38%
Valid Votes	51,037	92.23%	558,804	90.49%	8,026,322	96.03%
Rejected Votes	4,262	7.70%	58,333	9.45%	581,465	6.96%
Total Polled	55,338	65.00%	617,559	61.70%	8,358,246	59.29%
Registered Electors	85,136		1,000,861		14,097,690	

=== 2004 Sri Lankan Parliamentary Election ===
Party	Nawalapitiya		Kandy Electoral District		Sri Lanka	
Party	Votes	%	Votes	%	Votes	%
UNP	25,823	50.99%	313,859	49.99%	3,486,792	37.73%
UPFA	22,708	44.84%	268,131	42.71%	4,223,126	45.70%
JHU	1,793	3.54%	42,192	6.72%	552,723	5.98%
Other Parties (with < 1%)	318	0.63%	3,684	0.59%	64,227	0.69%
Valid Votes	50,642	91.92%	627,866	93.24%	9,241,931	94.52%
Rejected Votes	4,421	8.02%	45,484	6.75%	534,452	5.47%
Total Polled	55,093	71.83%	673,380	76.47%	9,777,821	75.74%
Registered Electors	76,700		880,634		12,909,631	

=== 2001 Sri Lankan Parliamentary Election ===
Party	Nawalapitiya		Kandy Electoral District		Sri Lanka	
Party	Votes	%	Votes	%	Votes	%
PA	25,630	49.81%	233,637	39.23%	3,330,815	37.19%
UNP	22,110	42.97%	314,297	52.77%	4,086,026	45.62%
JVP	2,811	5.46%	37,146	6.24%	815,353	9.10%
Other Parties (with < 1%)	902	1.75%	10,496	1.76%	129,347	1.44%
Valid Votes	51,453	93.16%	595,576	93.40%	8,955,844	94.77%
Rejected Votes	3,780	6.84%	42,103	6.60%	494,009	5.23%
Total Polled	55,233	75.68%	637,679	76.03%	9,449,878	76.03%
Registered Electors	72,986		838,687		12,428,762	

=== 2000 Sri Lankan Parliamentary Election ===
Party	Nawalapitiya		Kandy Electoral District		Sri Lanka	
Party	Votes	%	Votes	%	Votes	%
PA	30,259	58.26%	282,282	46.66%	3,899,329	45.33%
UNP	16,089	30.98%	243,623	40.27%	3,451,765	40.12%
JVP	1,668	3.21%	21,565	3.56%	518,725	6.03%
NUA	1,388	2.67%	32,023	5.29%	185,593	2.16%
CWC	1,372	2.64%	6,108	1.01%	22,985	0.27%
Other Parties (with < 1%)	1,160	2.23%	19,327	3.19%	266,683	3.10%
Valid Votes	51,936	N/A	604,928	N/A	8,602,617	N/A

=== 1994 Sri Lankan Parliamentary Election ===
Party	Nawalapitiya		Kandy Electoral District		Sri Lanka	
Party	Votes	%	Votes	%	Votes	%
UNP	26,836	55.20%	301,824	52.35%	3,498,370	44.04%
PA	21,402	44.03%	267,683	46.43%	3,887,805	48.94%
Other Parties (with < 1%)	374	0.77%	7,045	1.22%	175,576	2.21%
Valid Votes	48,612	93.92%	576,552	94.89%	7,943,688	95.20%
Rejected Votes	3,148	6.08%	31,019	5.11%	400,395	4.80%
Total Polled	51,760	82.16%	607,571	81.67%	8,344,095	74.75%
Registered Electors	62,996		743,939		11,163,064	

=== 1989 Sri Lankan Parliamentary Election ===
Party	Nawalapitiya		Kandy Electoral District		Sri Lanka	
Party	Votes	%	Votes	%	Votes	%
UNP	22,315	64.05%	204,973	61.72%	2,838,005	50.71%
SLFP	10,425	29.92%	105,977	31.91%	1,785,369	31.90%
SLMC	1,065	3.06%	14,697	4.43%	202,016	3.61%
USA	921	2.64%	5,147	1.55%	141,983	2.54%
Other Parties (with < 1%)	114	0.33%	1,315	0.40%	67,723	1.21%
Valid Votes	34,840	92.60%	332,109	93.69%	5,596,468	93.87%
Rejected Votes	2,784	7.40%	22,374	6.31%	365,563	6.13%
Total Polled	37,624	70.55%	354,483	56.42%	5,962,031	63.60%
Registered Electors	53,327		628,317		9,374,164	

== Demographics ==
=== Ethnicity ===
The Nawalapitiya Polling Division has a Sinhalese majority (60.1%), a significant Indian Tamil population (16.5%) and a significant Moor population (15.7%) . In comparison, the Kandy Electoral District (which contains the Nawalapitiya Polling Division) has a Sinhalese majority (74.4%) and a significant Moor population (13.9%)

Ethnicity in Nawalapitiya
1. Sinhalese (60.1%)
2. Indian Tamil (16.5%)
3. Moor (15.7%)
4. Sri Lankan Tamil (7.00%)
5. Other (0.70%)

=== Religion ===
The Nawalapitiya Polling Division has a Buddhist majority (59.3%), a significant Hindu population (20.9%) and a significant Muslim population (16.3%) . In comparison, the Kandy Electoral District (which contains the Nawalapitiya Polling Division) has a Buddhist majority (73.4%) and a significant Muslim population (14.3%)

Religion in Nawalapitiya
1. Buddhist (59.3%)
2. Hindu (20.9%)
3. Muslim (16.3%)
4. Roman Catholic (2.20%)
5. Other Christian (1.30%)
6. Other (0.00%)
