= Poojapitiya Divisional Secretariat =

Pujapitiya Divisional Secretariat
- Divisional Secretariat
- Interactive map of Pujapitiya Divisional Secretariat
- Country: Sri Lanka
- Province: Central Province
- District: Kandy District

Area
  - Total: 59 km^{2} (23 sq mi)

Population (2024)
  - Total: 60,316
  - Density: 1,022/km^{2} (2,650/sq mi)
- Time zone: UTC+5:30 (Sri Lanka Standard Time)

Pujapitiya Divisional Secretariat is a Divisional Secretariat of Kandy District, of Central Province, Sri Lanka.

== Demography-Religion ==
Religion in Poojapitiya DS Division (2012)
1. Buddhist (80.0%)
2. Hindu (2.70%)
3. Muslim (16.5%)
4. Roman Catholic (0.30%)
5. Other Christian (0.40%)
6. Other (0.00%)
