= Udadumbara Divisional Secretariat =

- Divisional Secretariat
- Country: Sri Lanka
- Province: Central Province
- District: Kandy District

Area
  - Total: 277 km^{2} (107 sq mi)

Population (2024)
  - Total: 23,046
  - Density: 83/km^{2} (210/sq mi)
- Time zone: UTC+5:30 (Sri Lanka Standard Time)

Udadumbara Divisional Secretariat is a Divisional Secretariat of Kandy District, of Central Province, Sri Lanka.

== Demography-Religion ==
Religion in Udadumbara DS Division (2012)
1. Buddhist (91.4%)
2. Hindu (7.30%)
3. Muslim (0.80%)
4. Roman Catholic (0.20%)
5. Other Christian (0.20%)
6. Other (0.00%)
