= Kandy Four Gravets and Gangawata Korale Divisional Secretariat =

Kandy Four Gravets and Gangawata Korale Divisional Secretariat මහනුවර කඩවත් සතර සහ ගඟවටකෝරළේ ප්‍රාදේශීය ලේකම් කාර්යාලය Gagawata Korale Divisional Secretariat
- Divisional Secretariat
- Interactive map of Kandy Four Gravets and Gangawata Korale Divisional Secretariat
- Country: Sri Lanka
- Province: Central Province
- District: Kandy District

Area
  - Total: 23 sq mi (59 km^{2})

Population (2024)
  - Total: 153,329
  - Density: 6,730/sq mi (2,599/km^{2})
- Time zone: UTC+5:30 (Sri Lanka Standard Time)
- Postal code: 20000
- Area code: 081

Kandy Four Gravets and Gangawata Korale Divisional Secretariat (Sinhala: මහනුවර කඩවත් සතර සහ ගඟවට කෝරළේ, Tamil: கண்டிப்பட்டினம்) is a Divisional Secretariat of Kandy District, of Central Province, Sri Lanka.

Gangawata Korale is divided into 64 Grama Niladhari Divisions.

== Demography-Religion ==
Religion in Kandy Four Gravets & Gangawata Korale DS Division (2012)
1. Buddhist (70.9%)
2. Hindu (10.2%)
3. Muslim (12.0%)
4. Roman Catholic (4.80%)
5. Other Christian (2.10%)
6. Other (0.00%)

== History ==
Prior to its formation, Kandy Four Gravets and Gangawata Korale Divisional Secretariat, including Kandy, was a part of Gangawata Korale, Yatinuwara Divisional Secretariat.
