= Giragama Walawwa =

- ගිරාගම වලව්ව
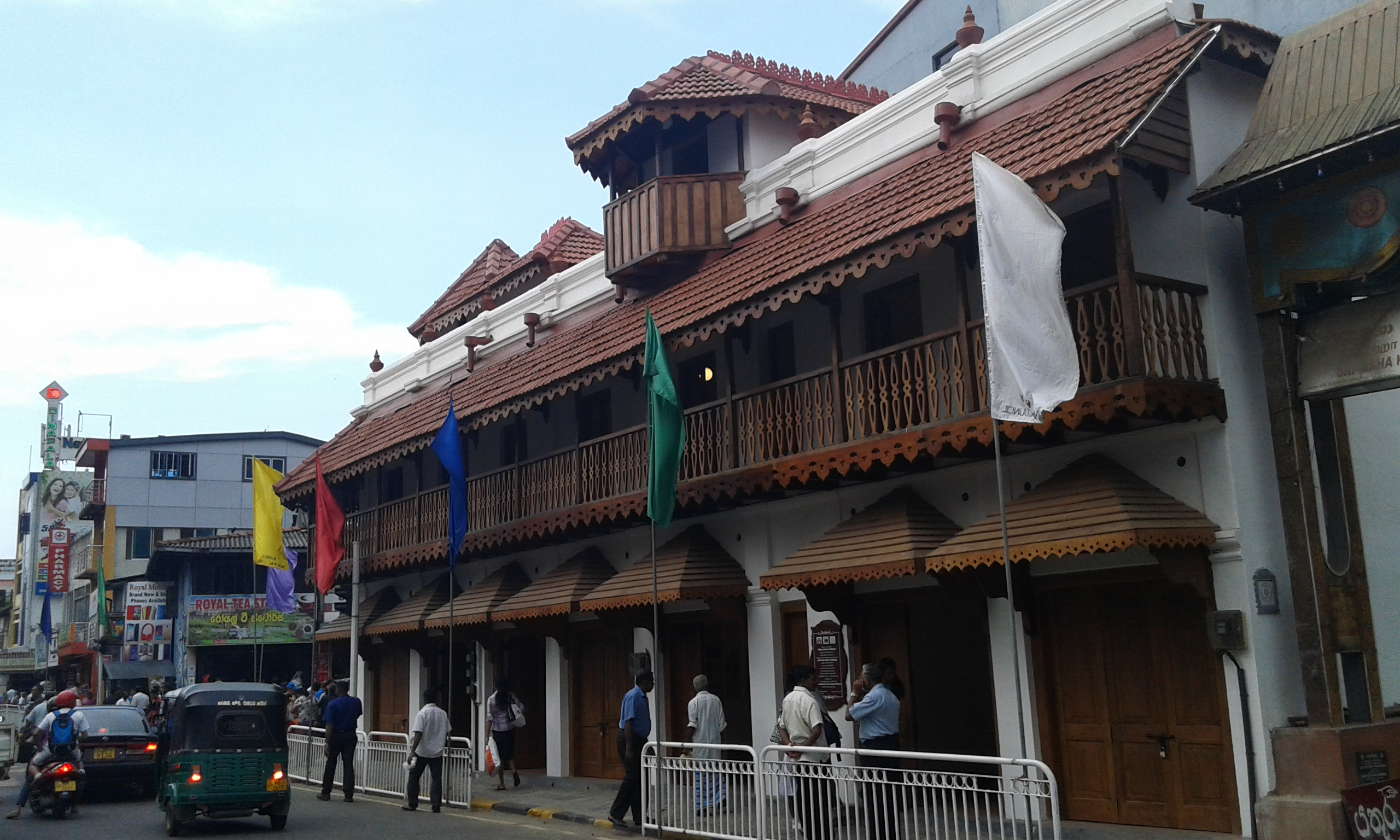
- Interactive map of Giragama Walawwa

General information
- Type: Walawwa
- Location: Yatinuwara veediya, Kandy, Sri Lanka
- Coordinates: 07°17′39.6″N 80°38′09.5″E
- Completed: 1814

Archaeological Protected Monument of Sri Lanka
- Designated: 8 July 2005; 23 February 2007

Giragama Walawwa is a historic Walawwa building located on the corner of Yatinuwara Veediya (Brownrigg Street) and Sir Bennet Soysa Veediya (Colombo Street) Kandy, Sri Lanka. The building is originally built in 1814 and considered as the oldest walawwa building within the Kandy. It was the residence of former Diyawadana Nilame Kudamudiyanse Giragama.

In the central part of the building is a wooden tower, which is unique to the building and can not be found in other Walawwas throughout the country. Archaeologists believe that tower could be some kind of a "watch tower or a "security tower" used by the early residents. The building has been formally recognised by the government as an archaeological protected monument.

In 2014 the Kandy Municipal Council together with the Central Cultural Fund and the Urban Redevelopment Authority resolved to restore the building, at an estimated cost of Rs 7.2 million. The works were completed in September 2015 at a total cost of Rs 15.08 million and officially opened by Governor Surangani Ellawala.

== See also ==
- Architecture of Sri Lanka

== Notes ==
- "PART I : SECTION (I) — GENERAL Government Notifications" (PDF). The Gazette of the Democratic Socialist Republic of Sri Lanka. 1486. 23 February 2007. Archived from the original (PDF) on 2019-06-22.
