= Hatharaliyadda Divisional Secretariat =

Hatharaliyadda Division
- Divisional Secretariat
- Country: Sri Lanka
- Province: Central Province
- District: Kandy District
- Hataraliyadda Divisional Secretariate: 2000

Government
  - Divisional Secretary: First Divisional Secretary - Mr. Daya Siriwardhana

Area
  - Total: 62 km^{2} (24 sq mi)

Population (2024)
  - Total: 31,141
  - Density: 502/km^{2} (1,300/sq mi)
- Time zone: UTC+5:30 (Sri Lanka Standard Time)

Hatharaliyadda Divisional Secretariat is a Divisional Secretariat of Kandy District, of Central Province, Sri Lanka.

== Demography-Religion ==
Religion in Hatharaliyadda DS Division (2012)
1. Buddhist (92.9%)
2. Hindu (1.50%)
3. Muslim (5.20%)
4. Roman Catholic (0.30%)
5. Other Christian (0.10%)
6. Other (0.00%)
