= Thumpane Divisional Secretariat =

- Divisional Secretariat
- Interactive map of Thumpane Divisional Secretariat
- Country: Sri Lanka
- Province: Central Province
- District: Kandy District

Area
  - Total: 54 km^{2} (21 sq mi)

Population (2024)
  - Total: 38,776
  - Density: 718/km^{2} (1,860/sq mi)
- Time zone: UTC+5:30 (Sri Lanka Standard Time)

Thumpane Divisional Secretariat is a Divisional Secretariat of Kandy District, of Central Province, Sri Lanka.

== Demography-Religion ==
Religion in Thumpane DS Division (2012)
1. Buddhist (91.9%)
2. Hindu (0.50%)
3. Muslim (6.90%)
4. Roman Catholic (0.30%)
5. Other Christian (0.40%)
6. Other (0.00%)
