= Teldeniya Polling Division =

Teldeniya
- Polling Division
- Coordinates: 7.297949°N 80.796226°E
- Country: Sri Lanka
- Province: Central Province, Sri Lanka
- Electoral District: Kandy Electoral District

Area
  - Total: 187.68 km^{2} (72.46 sq mi)

Population (2012)
  - Total: 61,034
  - Density: 325/km^{2} (840/sq mi)
- ISO 3166 code: EC-04E

The Teldeniya Polling Division is a Polling Division in the Kandy Electoral District, in the Central Province, Sri Lanka.

== Presidential Election Results ==
=== Summary ===
The winner of Teldeniya has matched the final country result 7 out of 8 times. Hence, Teldeniya is a bellwether for presidential elections.

Year	Teldeniya	Kandy Electoral District	MAE %	Sri Lanka	MAE %
2019	SLPP	SLPP	0.34%	SLPP	2.42%
2015	NDF	NDF	4.50%	NDF	1.21%
2010	UPFA	UPFA	2.24%	UPFA	1.45%
2005	UNP	UNP	3.03%	UPFA	2.86%
1999	PA	PA	1.90%	PA	0.81%
1994	PA	PA	0.52%	PA	6.12%
1988	UNP	UNP	4.28%	UNP	1.68%
1982	UNP	UNP	10.22%	UNP	5.33%
Matches/Mean MAE	7/8	7/8	3.38%	8/8	2.74%

=== 2019 Sri Lankan Presidential Election ===
Party	Teldeniya		Kandy Electoral District		Sri Lanka	
Party	Votes	%	Votes	%	Votes	%
SLPP	20,296	50.28%	471,502	50.43%	6,924,255	52.25%
NDF	18,238	45.18%	417,355	44.64%	5,564,239	41.99%
Other Parties (with < 1%)	1,153	2.86%	22,479	2.40%	345,452	2.61%
NMPP	681	1.69%	23,539	2.52%	418,553	3.16%
Valid Votes	40,368	98.97%	934,875	99.04%	13,252,499	98.99%
Rejected Votes	422	1.03%	9,020	0.96%	135,452	1.01%
Total Polled	40,790	85.86%	943,895	84.89%	13,387,951	83.71%
Registered Electors	47,510		1,111,860		15,992,568	

=== 2015 Sri Lankan Presidential Election ===
Party	Teldeniya		Kandy Electoral District		Sri Lanka	
Party	Votes	%	Votes	%	Votes	%
NDF	18,624	49.83%	466,994	54.56%	6,217,162	51.28%
UPFA	18,150	48.56%	378,585	44.23%	5,768,090	47.58%
Other Parties (with < 1%)	603	1.61%	10,329	1.21%	138,200	1.14%
Valid Votes	37,377	98.64%	855,908	98.73%	12,123,452	98.85%
Rejected Votes	517	1.36%	10,993	1.27%	140,925	1.15%
Total Polled	37,894	79.47%	866,901	79.71%	12,264,377	78.69%
Registered Electors	47,685		1,087,542		15,585,942	

=== 2010 Sri Lankan Presidential Election ===
Party	Teldeniya		Kandy Electoral District		Sri Lanka	
Party	Votes	%	Votes	%	Votes	%
UPFA	19,009	56.11%	406,636	54.16%	6,015,934	57.88%
NDF	13,957	41.20%	329,492	43.89%	4,173,185	40.15%
Other Parties (with < 1%)	910	2.69%	14,658	1.95%	204,494	1.97%
Valid Votes	33,876	98.52%	750,786	98.85%	10,393,613	99.03%
Rejected Votes	509	1.48%	8,700	1.15%	101,838	0.97%
Total Polled	34,385	76.17%	759,486	75.87%	10,495,451	66.70%
Registered Electors	45,144		1,001,074		15,734,587	

=== 2005 Sri Lankan Presidential Election ===
Party	Teldeniya		Kandy Electoral District		Sri Lanka	
Party	Votes	%	Votes	%	Votes	%
UNP	16,646	51.11%	387,150	54.33%	4,706,366	48.43%
UPFA	15,367	47.19%	315,672	44.30%	4,887,152	50.29%
Other Parties (with < 1%)	554	1.70%	9,798	1.37%	123,521	1.27%
Valid Votes	32,567	98.63%	712,620	98.64%	9,717,039	98.88%
Rejected Votes	452	1.37%	9,817	1.36%	109,869	1.12%
Total Polled	33,019	79.63%	722,437	77.37%	9,826,908	69.51%
Registered Electors	41,465		933,754		14,136,979	

=== 1999 Sri Lankan Presidential Election ===
Party	Teldeniya		Kandy Electoral District		Sri Lanka	
Party	Votes	%	Votes	%	Votes	%
PA	14,497	52.25%	308,187	50.29%	4,312,157	51.12%
UNP	11,955	43.09%	276,360	45.10%	3,602,748	42.71%
JVP	669	2.41%	15,512	2.53%	343,927	4.08%
Other Parties (with < 1%)	622	2.24%	12,752	2.08%	176,679	2.09%
Valid Votes	27,743	97.47%	612,811	97.29%	8,435,754	97.69%
Rejected Votes	720	2.53%	17,060	2.71%	199,536	2.31%
Total Polled	28,463	78.60%	629,871	77.61%	8,635,290	72.17%
Registered Electors	36,214		811,606		11,965,536	

=== 1994 Sri Lankan Presidential Election ===
Party	Teldeniya		Kandy Electoral District		Sri Lanka	
Party	Votes	%	Votes	%	Votes	%
PA	14,309	55.99%	320,110	56.64%	4,709,205	62.28%
UNP	10,742	42.03%	235,519	41.68%	2,715,283	35.91%
Other Parties (with < 1%)	505	1.98%	9,488	1.68%	137,040	1.81%
Valid Votes	25,556	97.61%	565,117	97.55%	7,561,526	98.03%
Rejected Votes	625	2.39%	14,179	2.45%	151,706	1.97%
Total Polled	26,181	79.36%	579,296	77.85%	7,713,232	69.12%
Registered Electors	32,992		744,151		11,158,880	

=== 1988 Sri Lankan Presidential Election ===
Party	Teldeniya		Kandy Electoral District		Sri Lanka	
Party	Votes	%	Votes	%	Votes	%
UNP	9,912	50.63%	234,124	54.88%	2,569,199	50.43%
SLFP	9,417	48.10%	186,187	43.65%	2,289,857	44.95%
SLMP	247	1.26%	6,266	1.47%	235,701	4.63%
Valid Votes	19,576	98.30%	426,577	98.57%	5,094,754	98.24%
Rejected Votes	339	1.70%	6,167	1.43%	91,499	1.76%
Total Polled	19,915	72.00%	432,744	68.36%	5,186,256	55.87%
Registered Electors	27,659		633,030		9,283,143	

=== 1982 Sri Lankan Presidential Election ===
Party	Teldeniya		Kandy Electoral District		Sri Lanka	
Party	Votes	%	Votes	%	Votes	%
UNP	13,258	49.08%	289,621	59.80%	3,450,815	52.93%
SLFP	12,747	47.19%	178,647	36.89%	2,546,348	39.05%
JVP	821	3.04%	12,493	2.58%	273,428	4.19%
Other Parties (with < 1%)	186	0.69%	3,536	0.73%	249,460	3.83%
Valid Votes	27,012	99.02%	484,297	99.07%	6,520,156	98.78%
Rejected Votes	267	0.98%	4,548	0.93%	80,470	1.22%
Total Polled	27,279	867.38%	488,845	89.44%	6,600,626	80.15%
Registered Electors	3,145		546,565		8,235,358	

== Parliamentary Election Results ==
=== Summary ===
The winner of Teldeniya has matched the final country result 5 out of 7 times. Hence, Teldeniya is a Weak Bellwether for Parliamentary Elections.

Year	Teldeniya	Kandy Electoral District	MAE %	Sri Lanka	MAE %
2015	UNP	UNP	3.57%	UNP	3.23%
2010	UPFA	UPFA	1.20%	UPFA	2.55%
2004	UNP	UNP	3.40%	UPFA	5.58%
2001	UNP	UNP	1.98%	UNP	4.12%
2000	PA	PA	3.17%	PA	3.61%
1994	UNP	UNP	1.11%	PA	3.84%
1989	UNP	UNP	5.36%	UNP	5.63%
Matches/Mean MAE	5/7	5/7	2.83%	7/7	4.08%

=== 2015 Sri Lankan Parliamentary Election ===
Party	Teldeniya		Kandy Electoral District		Sri Lanka	
Party	Votes	%	Votes	%	Votes	%
UNP	17,501	52.09%	440,761	55.61%	5,098,916	45.77%
UPFA	14,454	43.02%	309,152	39.00%	4,732,664	42.48%
JVP	962	2.86%	30,669	3.87%	544,154	4.88%
CWC	480	1.43%	4,400	0.56%	17,107	0.15%
Other Parties (with < 1%)	198	0.59%	7,655	0.97%	82,981	0.74%
Valid Votes	33,595	93.82%	792,637	95.48%	11,140,333	95.35%
Rejected Votes	2,195	6.13%	37,065	4.46%	516,926	4.42%
Total Polled	35,807	75.09%	830,165	79.13%	11,684,111	77.66%
Registered Electors	47,685		1,049,160		15,044,490	

=== 2010 Sri Lankan Parliamentary Election ===
Party	Teldeniya		Kandy Electoral District		Sri Lanka	
Party	Votes	%	Votes	%	Votes	%
UPFA	14,275	62.29%	339,819	60.81%	4,846,388	60.38%
UNP	7,732	33.74%	192,798	34.50%	2,357,057	29.37%
DNA	800	3.49%	23,728	4.25%	441,251	5.50%
Other Parties (with < 1%)	109	0.48%	2,459	0.44%	30,354	0.38%
Valid Votes	22,916	86.54%	558,804	90.49%	8,026,322	96.03%
Rejected Votes	3,540	13.37%	58,333	9.45%	581,465	6.96%
Total Polled	26,479	58.65%	617,559	61.70%	8,358,246	59.29%
Registered Electors	45,144		1,000,861		14,097,690	

=== 2004 Sri Lankan Parliamentary Election ===
Party	Teldeniya		Kandy Electoral District		Sri Lanka	
Party	Votes	%	Votes	%	Votes	%
UNP	13,380	48.65%	313,859	49.99%	3,486,792	37.73%
UPFA	13,321	48.43%	268,131	42.71%	4,223,126	45.70%
JHU	674	2.45%	42,192	6.72%	552,723	5.98%
Other Parties (with < 1%)	128	0.47%	3,684	0.59%	64,227	0.69%
Valid Votes	27,503	91.11%	627,866	93.24%	9,241,931	94.52%
Rejected Votes	2,685	8.89%	45,484	6.75%	534,452	5.47%
Total Polled	30,188	75.98%	673,380	76.47%	9,777,821	75.74%
Registered Electors	39,730		880,634		12,909,631	

=== 2001 Sri Lankan Parliamentary Election ===
Party	Teldeniya		Kandy Electoral District		Sri Lanka	
Party	Votes	%	Votes	%	Votes	%
UNP	13,792	50.64%	314,297	52.77%	4,086,026	45.62%
PA	11,276	41.40%	233,637	39.23%	3,330,815	37.19%
JVP	1,697	6.23%	37,146	6.24%	815,353	9.10%
Other Parties (with < 1%)	469	1.72%	10,496	1.76%	129,347	1.44%
Valid Votes	27,234	90.74%	595,576	93.40%	8,955,844	94.77%
Rejected Votes	2,780	9.26%	42,103	6.60%	494,009	5.23%
Total Polled	30,014	79.20%	637,679	76.03%	9,449,878	76.03%
Registered Electors	37,897		838,687		12,428,762	

=== 2000 Sri Lankan Parliamentary Election ===
Party	Teldeniya		Kandy Electoral District		Sri Lanka	
Party	Votes	%	Votes	%	Votes	%
PA	13,881	51.15%	282,282	46.66%	3,899,329	45.33%
UNP	10,373	38.23%	243,623	40.27%	3,451,765	40.12%
JVP	843	3.11%	21,565	3.56%	518,725	6.03%
Other Parties (with < 1%)	795	2.93%	19,327	3.19%	266,683	3.10%
CWC	772	2.84%	6,108	1.01%	22,985	0.27%
NUA	472	1.74%	32,023	5.29%	185,593	2.16%
Valid Votes	27,136	N/A	604,928	N/A	8,602,617	N/A

=== 1994 Sri Lankan Parliamentary Election ===
Party	Teldeniya		Kandy Electoral District		Sri Lanka	
Party	Votes	%	Votes	%	Votes	%
UNP	13,408	51.44%	301,824	52.35%	3,498,370	44.04%
PA	12,457	47.79%	267,683	46.43%	3,887,805	48.94%
Other Parties (with < 1%)	199	0.76%	7,045	1.22%	175,576	2.21%
Valid Votes	26,064	93.65%	576,552	94.89%	7,943,688	95.20%
Rejected Votes	1,766	6.35%	31,019	5.11%	400,395	4.80%
Total Polled	27,830	84.35%	607,571	81.67%	8,344,095	74.75%
Registered Electors	32,992		743,939		11,163,064	

=== 1989 Sri Lankan Parliamentary Election ===
Party	Teldeniya		Kandy Electoral District		Sri Lanka	
Party	Votes	%	Votes	%	Votes	%
UNP	6,019	56.99%	204,973	61.72%	2,838,005	50.71%
SLFP	4,146	39.26%	105,977	31.91%	1,785,369	31.90%
SLMC	249	2.36%	14,697	4.43%	202,016	3.61%
USA	113	1.07%	5,147	1.55%	141,983	2.54%
Other Parties (with < 1%)	34	0.32%	1,315	0.40%	67,723	1.21%
Valid Votes	10,561	93.30%	332,109	93.69%	5,596,468	93.87%
Rejected Votes	758	6.70%	22,374	6.31%	365,563	6.13%
Total Polled	11,319	41.53%	354,483	56.42%	5,962,031	63.60%
Registered Electors	27,254		628,317		9,374,164	

== Demographics ==
=== Ethnicity ===
The Teldeniya Polling Division has a Sinhalese majority (75.1%) and a significant Indian Tamil population (10.6%) . In comparison, the Kandy Electoral District (which contains the Teldeniya Polling Division) has a Sinhalese majority (74.4%) and a significant Moor population (13.9%)

Ethnicity in Teldeniya
1. Sinhalese (75.1%)
2. Indian Tamil (10.6%)
3. Sri Lankan Tamil (7.70%)
4. Moor (6.50%)
5. Other (0.10%)

=== Religion ===
The Teldeniya Polling Division has a Buddhist majority (74.8%) and a significant Hindu population (16.2%) . In comparison, the Kandy Electoral District (which contains the Teldeniya Polling Division) has a Buddhist majority (73.4%) and a significant Muslim population (14.3%)

Religion in Teldeniya
1. Buddhist (74.8%)
2. Hindu (16.2%)
3. Muslim (6.60%)
4. Roman Catholic (1.70%)
5. Other (0.80%)
