= Pathadumbara Divisional Secretariat =

- Divisional Secretariat
- Interactive map of Pathadumbara Divisional Secretariat
- Country: Sri Lanka
- Province: Central Province
- District: Kandy District

Area
  - Total: 51 km^{2} (20 sq mi)

Population (2024)
  - Total: 93,476
  - Density: 1,833/km^{2} (4,750/sq mi)
- Time zone: UTC+5:30 (Sri Lanka Standard Time)

Pathadumbara Divisional Secretariat is a Divisional Secretariat of Kandy District, of Central Province, Sri Lanka.

== Demography-Religion ==
Religion in Pathadumbara DS Division (2012)
1. Buddhist (73.3%)
2. Hindu (2.40%)
3. Muslim (22.8%)
4. Roman Catholic (1.20%)
5. Other Christian (0.40%)
6. Other (0.00%)
