= Medadumbara Divisional Secretariat =

- Divisional Secretariat
- Country: Sri Lanka
- Province: Central Province
- District: Kandy District

Area
  - Total: 196 km^{2} (76 sq mi)

Population (2024)
  - Total: 64,539
  - Density: 329/km^{2} (850/sq mi)
- Time zone: UTC+5:30 (Sri Lanka Standard Time)

Medadumbara Divisional Secretariat is a Divisional Secretariat of Kandy District, of Central Province, Sri Lanka.

== Demography-Religion ==
Religion in Medadumbara DS Division (2012)
1. Buddhist (74.8%)
2. Hindu (16.2%)
3. Muslim (6.60%)
4. Roman Catholic (1.70%)
5. Other Christian (0.80%)
6. Other (0.00%)
