= Udapalatha Divisional Secretariat =

Udapalatha Divisional Secretariat Udapalatha Pradeshiya Sabhava
- Divisional Secretariat
- Interactive map of Udapalatha Divisional Secretariat
- Country: Sri Lanka
- Province: Central Province
- District: Kandy District

Area
  - Total: 94 km^{2} (36 sq mi)

Population (2024)
  - Total: 103,181
  - Density: 1,098/km^{2} (2,840/sq mi)
- Time zone: UTC+5:30 (Sri Lanka Standard Time)
- Area code: 081

Udapalatha Divisional Secretariat is a Divisional Secretariat of Kandy District, of Central Province, Sri Lanka.

== Demography-Religion ==
Religion in Udapalatha DS Division (2024)
1. Buddhist (52.9%)
2. Hindu (20.2%)
3. Muslim (24.4%)
4. Roman Catholic (1.70%)
5. Other Christian (0.90%)
6. Other (0.00%)
