= Harispattuwa Divisional Secretariat =

- Divisional Secretariat
- Interactive map of Harispattuwa Divisional Secretariat
- Coordinates: 7°20′02″N 80°35′25″E
- Country: Sri Lanka
- Province: Central Province
- District: Kandy District

Area
  - Total: 49 km^{2} (19 sq mi)

Population (2024)
  - Total: 94,021
  - Density: 1,919/km^{2} (4,970/sq mi)
- Time zone: UTC+5:30 (Sri Lanka Standard Time)

Harispattuwa Divisional Secretariat is a Divisional Secretariat of Kandy District, of Central Province, Sri Lanka. Its office is located in Nugawela near the Kandy North bus depot.

== Demographics ==
Religion in Harispattuwa DS Division (2012)
1. Buddhist (85.6%)
2. Hindu (1.80%)
3. Muslim (10.9%)
4. Roman Catholic (1.20%)
5. Other Christian (0.50%)
6. Other (0.00%)
