= Kandy Electoral District =

Electoral district in Sri Lanka

Kandy (Mahanuwara)
- Electoral district for the Parliament of Sri Lanka
- Administrative district: Kandy
- Province: Central
- Polling divisions: 13
- Population: 1,396,000 (2008)
- Electorate: 970,456 (2010)
- Area: 1,940 km^{2} (750 sq mi)

Current Electoral district
- Number of members: 12
- MPs: NPP (9) K. D. Lalkantha; Jagath Manuwarna; Prasanna Gunasena; Hansaka Wijemuni; Thanura Dissanayake; E. M. Basnayaka; Riyaz Faruk; Thushari Jayasinghe; Mohomed Pasmin; Riyaz Faruk SJB (2) Rauff Hakeem; Chamindrani Kiriella NDF (1) Anuradha Jayaratne

Kandy (Mahanuwara) electoral district is one of the 22 multi-member electoral districts of Sri Lanka created by the 1978 Constitution of Sri Lanka. The district is conterminous with the administrative district of Kandy in the Central province. The district currently elects 12 of the 225 members of the Sri Lankan Parliament and had 970,456 registered electors in 2010. It is Sri Lanka's Electorate Number 04.

== Polling divisions ==
The Kandy Electoral District consists of the following polling divisions:

A: Galagedara

B: Harispattuwa

C: Pathadumbara

D: Ududumbara

E: Teldeniya

F: Kundasale

G: Hewaheta

H: Senkadagala

I: Mahanuwara (Kandy)

J: Yatinuwara

K: Udunuwara

L: Gampola

M: Nawalapitiya

== Presidential elections ==
=== 1982 presidential election ===
Results of the 1st presidential election held on 20 October 1982 for the district:

Candidate	Party	Votes per polling division													Postal votes	Total votes	%
Candidate	Party	Galagedara	Gampola	Harispattuwa	Hewaheta	Kandy	Kundasale	Nawalapitiya	Pathadumbara	Senkadagala	Teldeniya	Ududumbara	Udunuwara	Yatinuwara	Postal votes	Total votes	%
Junius Jayewardene	UNP	17,778	26,380	43,186	20,296	15,729	20,421	24,586	22,158	20,105	13,258	15,284	23,440	20,848	6,152	289,621	59.80%
Hector Kobbekaduwa	SLFP	11,874	15,340	23,301	12,286	6,498	12,898	13,512	11,783	13,219	12,747	12,242	12,100	17,596	3,251	178,647	36.89%
Rohana Wijeweera	JVP	1,092	528	3,374	419	408	1,138	961	669	621	821	456	852	964	190	12,493	2.58%
Colvin R. de Silva	LSSP	98	188	230	165	149	180	264	161	199	100	157	150	131	84	2,256	0.47%
Vasudeva Nanayakkara	NSSP	28	45	91	31	82	46	66	54	93	30	51	47	36	18	718	0.15%
Kumar Ponnambalam	ACTC	18	60	42	43	64	60	64	37	32	56	38	27	15	6	562	0.12%
Valid votes		30,888	42,541	70,224	33,240	22,930	34,743	39,453	34,862	34,269	27,012	28,228	36,616	39,590	9,701	484,297	100.00%
Rejected votes		214	394	605	414	203	355	411	382	277	267	358	246	325	97	4,548	
Total polled		31,102	42,935	70,829	33,654	23,133	35,098	39,864	35,244	34,546	27,279	28,586	36,862	39,915	9,798	488,845	
Registered electors		35,940	50,563	82,590	38,947	29,751	41,314	47,445	41,888	43,442	3,145	31,788	43,223	46,731		536,767	
Turnout		86.54%	84.91%	85.76%	86.41%	77.76%	84.95%	84.02%	84.14%	79.52%	867.38%	89.93%	85.28%	85.41%		91.07%	

=== 1988 presidential election ===
Results of the 2nd presidential election held on 19 December 1988 for the district:

Candidate	Party	Votes per polling division													Postal votes	Total votes	%
Candidate	Party	Galagedara	Gampola	Harispattuwa	Hewaheta	Kandy	Kundasale	Nawalapitiya	Pathadumbara	Senkadagala	Teldeniya	Ududumbara	Udunuwara	Yatinuwara	Postal votes	Total votes	%
Ranasinghe Premadasa	UNP	15,071	24,800	30,708	19,688	11,301	15,231	24,203	20,902	16,825	9,912	12,032	16,582	14,478	2,391	234,124	54.88%
Sirimavo Bandaranaike	SLFP	12,549	18,976	25,594	14,015	6,959	12,118	16,082	15,087	14,690	9,417	12,466	10,420	15,699	2,115	186,187	43.65%
Ossie Abeygunasekara	SLMP	330	418	719	298	617	433	559	557	834	247	324	315	515	100	6,266	1.47%
Valid votes		27,950	44,194	57,021	34,001	18,877	27,782	40,844	36,546	32,349	19,576	24,822	27,317	30,692	4,606	426,577	100.00%
Rejected votes		263	517	962	373	297	407	521	611	395	339	386	550	362	184	6,167	
Total polled		28,213	44,711	57,983	34,374	19,174	28,189	41,365	37,157	32,744	19,915	25,208	27,867	31,054	4,790	432,744	
Registered electors		39,671	55,425	94,109	42,868	28,958	48,841	54,010	48,741	48,208	27,659	37,345	50,223	52,182		628,240	
Turnout		71.12%	80.67%	61.61%	80.19%	66.21%	57.72%	76.59%	76.23%	67.92%	72.00%	67.50%	55.49%	59.51%		68.88%	

=== 1994 presidential election ===
Results of the 3rd presidential election held on 9 November 1994 for the district:

Candidate	Party	Votes per polling division													Postal votes	Total votes	%
Candidate	Party	Galagedara	Gampola	Harispattuwa	Hewaheta	Kandy	Kundasale	Nawalapitiya	Pathadumbara	Senkadagala	Teldeniya	Ududumbara	Udunuwara	Yatinuwara	Postal votes	Total votes	%
Chandrika Kumaratunga	PA	17,288	29,558	48,134	19,303	12,339	24,150	26,785	23,082	22,323	14,309	22,944	24,199	25,099	10,597	320,110	56.64%
Srima Dissanayake	UNP	14,862	19,692	33,007	18,076	10,477	18,243	19,423	19,995	17,152	10,742	11,906	17,442	17,621	6,881	235,519	41.68%
Hudson Samarasinghe	Ind 2	201	350	582	318	98	285	344	349	172	238	277	287	226	21	3,748	0.66%
Harischandra Wijayatunga	SMBP	118	193	303	107	258	238	176	175	335	92	86	215	220	102	2,618	0.46%
A. J. Ranasinghe	Ind 1	95	169	228	119	78	122	169	167	123	90	96	155	103	38	1,752	0.31%
Nihal Galappaththi	SLPF	61	105	219	74	41	102	110	109	62	85	126	101	130	45	1,370	0.24%
Valid votes		32,625	50,067	82,473	37,997	23,291	43,140	47,007	43,877	40,167	25,556	35,435	42,399	43,399	17,684	565,117	100.00%
Rejected votes		517	1,524	1,809	921	583	1,081	1,509	1,652	912	625	892	945	934	275	14,179	
Total polled		33,142	51,591	84,282	38,918	23,874	44,221	48,516	45,529	41,079	26,181	36,327	43,344	44,333	17,959	579,296	
Registered electors		43,462	66,812	109,246	50,376	32,335	56,925	62,996	57,482	55,740	32,992	42,700	56,671	58,455		726,192	
Turnout		76.26%	77.22%	77.15%	77.26%	73.83%	77.68%	77.01%	79.21%	73.70%	79.36%	85.07%	76.48%	75.84%		79.77%	

=== 1999 presidential election ===
Results of the 4th presidential election held on 21 December 1999 for the district:

Candidate	Party	Votes per polling division													Postal votes	Total votes	%
Candidate	Party	Galagedara	Gampola	Harispattuwa	Hewaheta	Kandy	Kundasale	Nawalapitiya	Pathadumbara	Senkadagala	Teldeniya	Ududumbara	Udunuwara	Yatinuwara	Postal votes	Total votes	%
Chandrika Kumaratunga	PA	16,777	29,986	40,996	19,900	10,101	23,259	28,277	32,945	19,893	14,497	18,216	22,192	23,135	8,013	308,187	50.29%
Ranil Wickramasinghe	UNP	16,428	23,928	41,640	19,808	13,809	22,974	20,885	17,372	20,803	11,955	16,335	21,920	21,219	7,284	276,360	45.10%
Nandana Gunathilake	JVP	933	828	2,782	638	639	1,569	1,353	928	1,173	669	632	1,199	1,293	876	15,512	2.53%
Harischandra Wijayatunga	SMBP	134	244	384	108	349	267	184	168	431	107	113	251	301	239	3,280	0.54%
W. V. M. Ranjith	Ind 2	115	141	244	153	40	131	195	134	83	139	135	139	125	1	1,775	0.29%
Abdul; Rasool	SLMP	57	163	359	149	109	78	110	122	114	33	54	240	105	13	1,706	0.28%
Rajiva; Wijesinha	LPSL	93	161	230	128	43	113	149	119	73	88	186	124	102	5	1,614	0.26%
Tennyson Edirisuriya	Ind 1	70	159	165	116	34	74	165	125	66	109	133	83	61	9	1,369	0.22%
Vasudeva Nanayakkara	LDA	46	94	110	42	105	60	88	55	133	34	29	68	103	98	1,065	0.17%
Kamal Karunadasa	PLSF	41	90	91	51	29	45	86	56	38	50	60	58	49	5	749	0.12%
Hudson Samarasinghe	Ind 3	49	51	114	46	14	43	77	35	29	34	48	45	54	0	639	0.10%
A. W. Premawardhana	PFF	15	22	43	16	9	25	31	20	13	14	30	31	21	0	290	0.05%
Ariyawansha Dissanayaka	DUNF	16	26	40	19	11	16	22	12	16	14	22	22	24	5	265	0.04%
Valid votes		34,774	55,893	87,198	41,174	25,292	48,654	51,622	52,091	42,865	27,743	35,993	46,372	46,592	16,548	612,811	100.00%
Rejected votes		637	1,626	2,720	1,059	624	1,415	1,513	1,338	1,213	720	922	1,204	1,464	605	17,060	
Total polled		35,411	57,519	89,918	42,233	25,916	50,069	53,135	53,429	44,078	28,463	36,915	47,576	48,056	17,153	629,871	
Registered electors		46,621	73,137	120,150	55,180	34,410	65,317	69,098	63,055	59,187	36,214	46,840	62,497	62,747		794,453	
Turnout		75.96%	78.65%	74.84%	76.54%	75.32%	76.66%	76.90%	84.73%	74.47%	78.60%	78.81%	76.13%	76.59%		79.28%	

=== 2005 presidential election ===
Results of the 5th presidential election held on 17 November 2005 for the district:

Candidate	Party	Votes per polling division													Postal votes	Total votes	%
Candidate	Party	Galagedara	Gampola	Harispattuwa	Hewaheta	Kandy	Kundasale	Nawalapitiya	Pathadumbara	Senkadagala	Teldeniya	Ududumbara	Udunuwara	Yatinuwara	Postal votes	Total votes	%
Ranil Wickramasinghe	UNP	20,177	35,829	59,899	25,874	17,130	31,321	29,882	31,957	28,894	16,646	20,269	30,979	27,791	10,502	387,150	54.33%
Mahinda Rajapaksa	UPFA	17,453	25,790	43,540	19,058	9,435	27,385	28,544	20,610	22,670	15,367	19,973	22,733	27,428	15,686	315,672	44.30%
Siritunga Jayasuriya	USP	177	276	390	233	55	204	296	284	124	176	186	203	159	12	2,775	0.39%
A. A. Suraweera	NDF	200	258	322	231	55	169	277	206	120	138	207	181	210	15	2,589	0.36%
Victor; Hettigoda	ULPP	48	86	147	55	57	83	85	100	83	45	55	90	100	57	1,091	0.15%
Chamil Jayaneththi	NLF	49	70	91	48	20	33	74	73	37	43	68	55	48	8	717	0.10%
Wimal Geeganage	SLNF	42	64	77	38	6	35	63	50	29	38	46	45	46	5	584	0.08%
Anura de Silva	ULF	43	65	84	38	14	26	44	39	25	35	33	45	34	4	529	0.07%
Aruna de Soyza	RPP	25	56	72	23	15	40	56	32	16	23	36	40	50	3	487	0.07%
A. K. J. Arachchige	DUA	20	41	62	28	7	24	40	27	16	22	28	29	26	2	372	0.05%
Wije; Dias	SEP	15	27	33	14	10	28	48	29	21	13	14	24	19	12	307	0.04%
P. Nelson; Perera	SLPF	12	19	39	14	6	20	28	17	12	17	9	14	12	0	219	0.03%
H. S. Dharmadwaja	UNAF	8	22	21	10	1	4	16	9	5	4	10	7	11	0	128	0.02%
Valid votes		38,269	62,603	104,777	45,664	26,811	59,372	59,453	53,433	52,052	32,567	40,934	54,445	55,934	26,306	712,620	100.00%
Rejected votes		382	1,036	1,432	660	335	746	965	885	630	452	564	726	594	410	9,817	
Total polled		38,651	63,639	106,209	46,324	27,146	60,118	60,418	54,318	52,682	33,019	41,498	55,171	56,528	26,716	722,437	
Registered electors		50,898	84,167	138,171	61,006	36,326	77,020	80,003	71,823	69,243	41,465	52,747	71,840	72,329		907,038	
Turnout		75.94%	75.61%	76.87%	75.93%	74.73%	78.06%	75.52%	75.63%	76.08%	79.63%	78.67%	76.80%	78.15%		79.65%	

=== 2010 presidential election ===
Results of the 6th presidential election held on 26 January 2010 for the district:

Candidate	Party	Votes per polling division													Postal votes	Total votes	%
Candidate	Party	Galagedara	Gampola	Harispattuwa	Hewaheta	Kandy	Kundasale	Nawalapitiya	Pathadumbara	Senkadagala	Teldeniya	Ududumbara	Udunuwara	Yatinuwara	Postal votes	Total votes	%
Mahinda Rajapaksa	UPFA	22,703	33,078	56,508	24,601	11,636	36,212	35,555	28,628	28,444	19,009	27,179	29,235	33,664	20,184	406,636	54.16%
Sarath; Fonseka	NDF	15,338	32,090	51,406	21,791	15,358	27,852	25,107	27,692	25,243	13,957	13,220	27,123	23,290	10,025	329,492	43.89%
M. C. M. Ismail	DUNF	170	273	277	295	47	209	332	238	105	183	265	216	177	23	2,810	0.37%
A. A. Suraweera	NDF	120	184	249	202	24	119	209	167	83	119	183	146	135	10	1,950	0.26%
C. J. Sugathsiri; Gamage	UDF	84	171	240	136	20	113	208	162	71	105	97	114	94	9	1,624	0.22%
W. V. M. Ranjith	Ind 1	59	129	148	94	31	79	124	97	65	75	132	82	77	8	1,200	0.16%
A. S. P. Liyanage	SLLP	75	104	107	119	16	73	117	108	50	45	89	76	74	6	1,059	0.14%
Sarath Manamendra	NSH	36	99	124	56	20	62	103	84	41	62	58	57	43	3	848	0.11%
Ukkubanda Wijekoon	Ind 3	42	60	112	62	11	50	73	66	28	45	68	54	37	3	711	0.09%
Lal; Perera	ONF	30	83	91	71	14	49	84	68	27	47	51	56	26	6	703	0.09%
Siritunga Jayasuriya	USP	28	61	84	52	4	39	64	71	29	35	44	45	40	4	600	0.08%
Aithurus; M. Illias	Ind 2	30	57	63	35	9	26	51	52	27	37	51	44	38	3	523	0.07%
Vikramabahu Karunaratne	LF	17	38	59	38	28	40	28	33	35	27	30	36	41	12	462	0.06%
M. K. Shivajilingam	Ind 5	19	49	34	41	16	29	51	50	28	21	30	39	31	4	442	0.06%
Wije; Dias	SEP	10	30	47	8	8	26	40	36	17	22	19	16	20	6	305	0.04%
Sanath Pinnaduwa	NA	13	46	33	31	7	12	36	29	10	12	18	30	17	1	295	0.04%
M. Mohamed; Musthaffa	Ind 4	14	18	29	26	4	16	22	24	16	18	17	15	23	1	243	0.03%
Ven.Battaramulla; Seelarathana Thero	JP	13	18	14	21	4	9	32	27	5	14	15	17	22	5	216	0.03%
Aruna de Soyza	RPP	13	25	27	12	5	12	21	19	3	14	11	20	9	1	192	0.03%
Senaratna de Silva	PNF	6	20	22	17	9	15	24	17	6	9	17	10	6	0	178	0.02%
M. B. Thaminimulla	ACAKO	13	14	22	5	5	8	15	20	19	12	6	11	6	2	158	0.02%
Sarath Kongahage	UNAF	3	10	18	8	1	10	24	15	4	8	13	12	11	2	139	0.02%
Valid votes		38,836	66,657	109,714	47,721	27,277	65,060	62,320	57,703	54,356	33,876	41,613	57,454	57,881	30,318	750,786	100.00%
Rejected votes		300	857	1,161	674	268	656	1,069	838	534	509	397	631	506	300	8,700	
Total polled		39,136	67,514	110,875	48,395	27,545	65,716	63,389	58,541	54,890	34,385	42,010	58,085	58,387	30,618	759,486	
Registered electors		52,553	91,146	147,475	65,176	36,938	85,857	85,136	78,688	72,906	45,144	55,629	76,812	76,996		970,456	
Turnout		74.47%	74.07%	75.18%	74.25%	74.57%	76.54%	74.46%	74.40%	75.29%	76.17%	75.52%	75.62%	75.83%		78.26%	

=== 2015 presidential election ===
Results of the 7th presidential election held on 26 January 2010 for the district:

Candidate	Party	Votes per polling division													Postal votes	Total votes	%
Candidate	Party	Galagedara	Gampola	Harispattuwa	Hewaheta	Kandy	Kundasale	Nawalapitiya	Pathadumbara	Senkadagala	Teldeniya	Ududumbara	Udunuwara	Yatinuwara	Postal votes	Total votes	%
Maithripala Sirisena	NDF	19,818	45,328	71,533	28,049	20,316	41,238	40,233	37,840	36,127	18,624	18,472	38,018	32,298	19,100	466,994	54.56%
Mahinda Rajapaksa	UPFA	21,466	33,293	51,156	24,167	10,200	32,930	32,619	26,762	26,062	18,150	27,722	25,984	30,194	17,880	378,585	44.23%
R. A. Sirisena	PNF	79	151	152	106	26	90	173	101	49	80	112	87	88	11	1,306	0.15%
Namal Rajapaksa	ONF	72	130	149	111	10	85	146	88	61	56	129	76	78	13	1,204	0.14%
M. I. Mohanmed; Mishlar	UPF	44	161	117	112	19	65	128	90	57	65	80	87	74	4	1,103	0.13%
A. S. P. Liyanage	SLLP	46	132	148	91	19	75	127	85	45	68	58	82	45	7	1,028	0.12%
R. Peduru Arachchi	ULPP	42	131	119	95	23	73	144	90	49	49	66	61	58	3	1,003	0.12%
Aithurus; M. Illias	Ind 1	47	68	108	56	24	49	95	64	48	63	66	59	42	10	799	0.09%
Duminda Nagamuwa	FSP	26	65	121	44	18	59	70	65	53	37	25	61	47	32	723	0.08%
Siritunga Jayasuriya	USP	39	61	82	46	15	32	105	57	31	31	44	48	28	9	628	0.07%
Sarath Manamendra	NSH	30	50	77	48	8	41	74	52	31	30	36	37	35	5	554	0.06%
Anurudha Polgampola	Ind 2	22	39	37	30	2	24	42	37	18	18	14	26	16	3	328	0.04%
Vajirapani Wijesiriwardene	SEP	16	43	35	17	7	23	42	23	25	29	13	25	15	5	318	0.04%
M. B. Theminimulla	ACAKO	15	37	46	33	5	20	25	30	31	15	11	29	11	4	312	0.04%
Sundaram Mahendran	NSSP	19	29	31	30	6	23	37	19	12	17	22	20	18	2	285	0.03%
Ven.Battaramulla Seelarathana Thero	JSP	10	22	37	17	7	20	44	27	17	11	10	19	21	15	277	0.03%
Prasanna Priyankara	DNM	11	14	19	14	5	20	22	20	10	11	12	13	9	2	182	0.02%
Jayantha Kulathunga	ULGC	5	20	20	11	2	13	26	22	5	9	10	13	3	4	163	0.02%
Wimal Geeganage	SLNF	8	11	10	2	3	10	10	8	4	14	15	9	9	3	116	0.01%
Valid votes		41,815	79,785	123,998	53,079	30,715	74,890	74,162	65,480	62,735	37,377	46,917	64,754	63,089	37,112	855,908	100.00%
Rejected votes		390	1,020	1,356	673	401	794	1,393	1,023	834	517	479	763	748	602	10,993	
Total polled		42,205	80,805	125,354	53,752	31,116	75,684	75,555	66,503	63,569	37,894	47,396	65,517	63,837	37,714	866,901	
Registered electors		54,214	102,219	157,463	69,243	40,020	94,870	95,567	85,375	81,149	47,685	58,637	82,298	80,420	38,382	1,049,106	
Turnout		77.85%	79.05%	79.61%	77.63%	77.75%	79.78%	79.06%	77.90%	78.34%	79.47%	80.83%	79.61%	79.38%	98.26%	82.63%	

=== 2019 presidential election ===
Results of the 8th presidential election held on 16 November 2019:

Candidate	Party	Votes per polling division													Postal votes	Total votes	%
Candidate	Party	Galagedara	Gampola	Harispattuwa	Hewaheta	Kandy	Kundasale	Nawalapitiya	Pathadumbara	Senkadagala	Teldeniya	Ududumbara	Udunuwara	Yatinuwara	Postal votes	Total votes	%
Gotabaya; Rajapaksa	SLPP	24,829	37,648	64,298	27,263	13,795	43,788	36,436	32,057	35,247	20,296	29,334	33,003	38,765	34,748	471,502	50.43%
Sajith; Premadasa	NDF	16,839	46,531	62,044	28,166	16,334	33,293	39,887	35,848	27,399	18,238	19,098	33,131	24,244	16,303	417,355	44.64%
Anura Kumara; Dissanayake	NMPP	959	1,469	3,401	791	966	2,539	1,740	1,439	2,189	681	748	1,913	2,021	2,683	25,539	2.52%
Mahesh; Senanayake	NPP	135	181	383	116	282	344	179	208	509	107	105	261	302	507	3,619	0.39%
Ariyawansa; Dissanayake	DUNF	105	244	245	190	37	143	284	213	122	109	135	146	112	24	2,109	0.23%
Ajantha; Perera	SPSL	132	160	251	136	41	140	189	153	112	84	120	126	146	34	1,824	0.2%
M. L. A. M. Hizbullah	Ind 11	78	192	227	125	33	137	224	157	86	96	142	122	92	22	1,733	0.19%
Rohan; Pallewatte	JSWP	93	118	219	84	81	155	138	123	162	79	98	109	125	55	1,639	0.18%
Siripala; Amarasinghe	Ind 02	77	171	137	103	22	91	178	159	58	85	78	93	57	13	1,322	0.14%
Milroy; Fernando	Ind 09	48	93	121	82	38	84	127	94	50	57	68	72	51	6	991	0.11%
Ven.Battaramulla; Seelarathana Thero	JSP	39	118	108	60	25	62	102	101	54	50	47	67	63	12	908	0.1%
Ajantha de zoysa	RJP	49	98	139	63	13	72	102	75	44	58	56	51	67	8	895	0.1%
Anuruddha; Polgampola	Ind 08	25	117	97	64	17	54	116	102	29	51	45	53	42	3	815	0.09%
Jayantha; Ketagoda	Ind 07	38	112	86	57	9	53	126	81	29	53	36	61	49	7	797	0.09%
Namal; Rajapaksa	NUA	44	52	80	36	19	37	62	35	40	28	50	42	42	1	577	0.06%
Subramanium; Gunaratnam	ONF	32	61	68	52	10	33	82	64	27	46	38	31	29	4	577	0.06%
Ven.Aparekke; Punnananda Thero	Ind 01	31	77	56	37	10	39	60	60	32	31	38	42	36	23	572	0.06%
A. S. P. Liyanage	SLLP	27	62	60	36	6	36	63	50	28	28	38	35	20	1	490	0.05%
Duminda; Nagamuwa	FSP	9	48	85	17	8	35	36	39	28	23	16	40	32	40	456	0.05%
Piyasiri; Wijenayake	Ind 13	19	30	33	21	4	28	36	30	15	16	23	24	16	3	298	0.03%
Aruna de soyza	DNM	16	28	42	20	2	20	34	28	13	16	15	23	15	2	274	0.03%
Rajiva; Wijesinha	Ind 14	22	21	27	26	2	15	31	33	15	17	18	22	11	6	266	0.03%
Sirithunga; Jayasuriya	USP	13	21	38	22	8	19	44	20	13	13	17	15	14	7	264	0.03%
Aithurus; M. Illiyas	Ind 03	9	25	26	14	8	20	45	39	13	8	17	18	16	2	260	0.03%
Sarath; Manamendra	NSU	12	24	43	19	5	20	26	24	5	14	13	13	16	2	236	0.03%
A. H. M. Alavi	Ind 04	10	27	31	14	4	18	26	20	11	15	10	9	8	2	205	0.02%
M. K. Shivajilingam	Ind 10	4	20	17	17	11	19	36	22	14	8	7	9	13	7	204	0.02%
Vajirapani; Wijesiriwardene	SEP	9	19	18	13	5	10	31	19	8	5	12	11	14	7	181	0.02%
Ashoka; Wadigamangawa	Ind 12	8	23	10	10	4	11	35	21	11	10	8	12	16	4	176	0.02%
Saman; Perera	OPPP	7	17	25	11	2	10	24	21	9	13	11	8	3	4	165	0.02%
Samaraweera; Weeravanni	Ind 15	3	17	19	21	1	14	19	21	4	3	7	11	7	0	147	0.02%
B.G. Nandimithra	NSSP	8	20	25	9	0	10	18	14	14	9	6	4	8	1	146	0.02%
Priyantha; Edirisinghe	ACAKO	7	19	16	6	2	6	14	14	10	6	9	17	12	1	139	0.01%
Sarath; Keerthirathna	Ind 05	4	10	17	7	0	10	11	16	9	9	8	8	7	4	120	0.01%
Samansiri; Herath	Ind 06	5	8	5	8	0	5	6	14	1	6	9	5	0	4	74	0.01%
Valid votes		43,745	87,881	132,497	57,716	31,804	81,370	80,567	71,414	66,405	40,368	50,478	69,607	66,464	55,559	934,875	100.00%
Rejected votes		277	816	1,135	627	409	700	1,030	684	666	422	345	563	584	762	9,020	0.81%
Total polled		44,022	88,697	133,632	58,343	32,213	82,070	81,597	72,098	67,071	40,790	50,823	70,170	67,048	55,321	943,895	84.89%
Registered electors		51,632	105,054	158,903	69,251	40,507	97,309	96,659	86,342	82,680	47,510	57,764	82,842	79,471	55,936	1,111,860	

=== 2024 presidential election ===
Results of the 9th presidential election held on 21 September 2024:

Candidate	Party	Votes per polling division													Postal votes	votes	%
Candidate	Party	Galagedara	Gampola	Harispattuwa	Hewaheta	Kandy	Kundasale	Nawalapitiya	Pathadumbara	Senkadagala	Teldeniya	Ududumbara	Udunuwara	Yatinuwara	Postal votes	votes	%
Anura Kumara; Dissanayake	NPP	18,232	28,750	59,456	19,457	13,336	38,452	28,929	26,788	30,655	14,817	17,226	33,232	32,909	32,295	394,534	42.26%
Sajith; Premadasa	SJB	15,568	31,503	50,539	23,658	9,083	27,999	28,535	29,760	17,851	15,332	22,336	23,326	19,374	9,134	323,998	34.71%
Ranil; Wickremesinghe	Ind16	5,982	21,991	17,182	10,729	6,361	11,628	19,470	10,539	13,139	7,192	6,280	10,383	11,196	10,635	162,707	17.43%
Namal; Rajapaksa	SLPP	1,224	1,652	2,732	1,469	380	1,933	969	1,367	1,018	795	2,386	1,367	1,409	702	19,403	2.08%
Dilith; Jayaweera	SLCP	386	859	1,167	406	416	914	687	589	849	427	200	845	927	426	9,098	0.97%
K. K. Piyadasa	Ind04	125	389	467	292	46	224	373	396	97	251	269	199	120	30	3,278	0.35%
D. M. Bandaranayake	Ind13	165	206	438	172	37	179	208	159	107	133	161	207	161	32	2,365	0.25%
Wijeyadasa; Rajapakshe	JPF	101	163	246	128	30	133	161	201	81	88	114	122	74	26	1,668	0.18%
Sarath; Fonseka	Ind12	77	175	201	94	45	127	166	125	100	87	104	115	118	50	1,584	0.17%
Suranjeewa; Anoj de Silva	DUNF	66	63	187	72	26	138	93	163	67	36	43	70	72	80	1,176	0.13%
Anuruddha; Polgampola	Ind11	50	99	181	86	32	87	111	103	40	58	73	79	63	12	1,074	0.12%
Sarath; Keerthirathne	Ind05	52	84	186	70	12	66	119	87	54	59	62	85	70	4	1,010	0.11%
Priyantha; Wickremesinghe	NSSP	38	132	102	87	19	60	131	101	47	80	79	58	50	15	999	0.11%
Ven.Akmeemana; Dayarathana Thero	Ind01	39	91	106	68	14	77	76	70	41	55	79	47	57	17	837	0.09%
Victor; Anthony Perera	Ind10	35	76	99	72	6	45	127	82	31	50	62	42	30	7	764	0.08%
K. R. Krishan	APP	47	62	120	53	10	70	85	73	23	30	71	59	47	4	754	0.08%
Siripala; Amarasinghe	Ind02	35	89	115	67	11	44	84	62	22	48	36	61	49	8	731	0.08%
Ajantha de Zoyza	RJA	48	80	110	50	15	51	72	59	32	40	44	58	47	9	715	0.08%
Namal; Rajapaksa	SBP	38	46	108	64	15	65	43	62	38	24	64	47	41	44	699	0.07%
Sirithunga; Jayasuriya	USP	29	73	86	43	11	32	78	54	30	36	39	42	36	5	594	0.06%
Nuwan; Bopege	SPF	11	85	106	18	18	47	31	33	18	8	24	65	34	48	546	0.06%
Ven.Battaramulle; Seelarathana Thero	JSP	28	39	75	32	15	45	40	34	42	21	8	37	57	24	497	0.05%
Abubakar Mohamed; Infaz	DUA	24	56	73	37	9	32	48	62	20	40	29	34	19	4	487	0.05%
Pakkiyaselvam; Ariyanethiran	Ind09	9	49	31	50	53	45	59	32	37	13	16	17	12	10	433	0.05%
Keerthi; Wickremeratne	AJP	15	54	48	23	25	35	44	22	28	36	28	31	32	11	432	0.05%
Premasiri; Manage	Ind14	29	48	53	30	5	17	31	66	10	22	25	23	23	2	384	0.04%
Vajirapani; Wijesiriwardene	SEP	13	50	41	21	11	27	64	38	16	14	8	25	23	3	354	0.04%
Oshala; Herath	NIF	19	29	38	42	9	25	39	39	9	17	27	21	19	4	337	0.04%
Mahinda; Dewage	SLSP	16	29	46	18	8	26	38	21	25	16	19	29	18	10	319	0.03%
Ananda; Kularatne	Ind06	19	31	47	20	3	15	30	24	9	23	16	12	16	10	275	0.03%
Roshan; Ranasinghe	Ind15	15	25	46	13	9	21	22	24	25	15	11	12	10	17	265	0.03%
P. W. S. K. Bandaranayake	NDF	13	32	36	14	4	13	21	18	13	18	20	14	12	5	233	0.02%
Lalith; De Silva	UNFP	21	13	27	13	8	28	24	15	12	11	21	14	18	7	232	0.02%
Sidney; Jayarathna	Ind07	4	22	19	12	5	14	13	14	11	11	7	17	12	1	162	0.02%
Mylvanagam; Thilakarajah	Ind08	7	20	24	6	3	26	15	18	8	8	6	11	9	0	161	0.02%
Janaka; Ratnayake	ULPP	8	12	19	12	7	8	13	16	21	6	9	6	16	7	160	0.02%
Sarath; Manamendra	NSU	6	12	29	11	8	8	12	15	3	7	9	10	9	1	140	0.01%
A. S. P. Liyanage	SLLP	9	9	25	5	4	12	9	6	6	6	11	5	3	1	111	0.01%
Valid votes		42,603	87,198	134,611	57,514	30,109	82,768	81,070	71,337	64,635	39,930	50,022	70,827	67,192	53,700	933,516	100.00%
Rejected votes		895	2,750	3,067	1,704	534	2,100	2,714	1,796	1,694	1,301	981	1,573	1,550	1,494	24,153	2.52%
Total polled		43,498	89,948	137,678	59,218	30,643	84,868	83,784	73,133	66,329	41,231	51,003	72,400	68,742	55,194	957,669	80.38%
Registered electors		54,236	113,385	173,626	74,173	41,303	106,339	103,976	93,042	87,760	50,662	61,289	89,918	85,893	55,797	1,191,399	

Preferential votes

8,020	9,188
Anura Kumara Dissanayake	Sajith Premadasa

== Parliamentary general elections ==
=== 1989 parliamentary general election ===
Results of the 9th parliamentary election held on 15 February 1989 for the district:

Party	Votes per polling division													Postal votes	Total votes	%	Seats
Party	Galagedara	Gampola	Harispattuwa	Hewaheta	Kandy	Kundasale	Nawalapitiya	Pathadumbara	Senkadagala	Teldeniya	Ududumbara	Udunuwara	Yatinuwara	Postal votes	Total votes	%	Seats
United National Party (Note: Including the Ceylon Workers' Congress.)	16,777	23,262	21,218	20,917	9,513	9,594	22,315	17,031	14,471	6,019	16,255	9,012	11,064	7,525	204,973	61.72%	8
Sri Lanka Freedom Party	7,686	13,450	10,538	10,307	3,911	4,206	10,425	6,979	8,853	4,146	9,373	3,352	8,661	4,090	105,977	31.91%	4
Sri Lanka Muslim Congress	495	1,555	2,476	800	1,263	685	1,065	1,740	1,018	249	84	2,682	500	85	14,697	4.43%	0
United Socialist Alliance (Note: Including the CPSL, LSSP, NSSP, SLMP.)	288	288	157	192	556	295	921	476	774	113	263	106	334	384	5,147	1.55%	0
United Lanka People's Party	81	97	108	119	132	116	114	73	129	34	110	52	61	89	1,315	0.40%	0
Valid votes	25,327	38,652	34,497	32,335	15,375	14,896	34,840	26,299	25,245	10,561	26,085	15,204	20,620	12,173	332,109	100.00%	12
Rejected votes	1,298	2,642	2,519	2,025	768	1,225	2,784	1,897	1,357	758	2,585	1,048	1,062	406	22,374		
Total polled	26,625	41,294	37,016	34,360	16,143	16,121	37,624	28,196	26,602	11,319	28,670	16,252	21,682	12,579	354,483		
Registered electors	38,747	54,611	92,300	42,178	28,267	47,758	53,327	47,713	46,746	27,254	36,923	48,915	50,598	12,980	628,317		
Turnout	68.71%	75.61%	40.10%	81.46%	57.11%	33.76%	70.55%	59.10%	56.91%	41.53%	77.65%	33.22%	42.85%	96.91%	56.42%		

The following candidates were elected:

Preferential votes
Alliance	Party	Candidate	Votes
UNP	UNP	D. B. Wijethunga	58,617
SLFP	SLFP	D. M. Jayaratne	54,290
UNP	UNP	M. A. Daniel (Note: Mahahitana Arachchige Daniel (UNP) was murdered on 25 June 1989.)	53,396
UNP	UNP	A. C. S. Hameed	36,375
UNP	UNP	A. R. M. Abdul Cader	33,757
UNP	UNP	Chandraman de Silva	29,726
UNP	UNP	Harindra Dunuwille	28,377
UNP	UNP	Tissa Attanayake	27,788
UNP	UNP	Lakshman Wijesiri	27,555
SLFP	SLFP	Mahinda Abeykoon	26,881
SLFP	SLFP	Yasaratne Tennakoon	22,736
SLFP	SLFP	Lakshman Kiriella	20,898

=== 1994 parliamentary general election ===
Results of the 10th parliamentary election held on 16 August 1994 for the district:

Party	Votes per polling division													Postal votes	Total votes	%	Seats
Party	Galagedara	Gampola	Harispattuwa	Hewaheta	Kandy	Kundasale	Nawalapitiya	Pathadumbara	Senkadagala	Teldeniya	Ududumbara	Udunuwara	Yatinuwara	Postal votes	Total votes	%	Seats
United National Party (Note: Including the Ceylon Workers' Congress.)	18,240	27,942	42,356	22,141	13,342	22,434	26,836	25,471	21,005	13,408	18,116	21,586	21,602	7,345	301,824	52.35%	7
People's Alliance (Note: Including the SLFP et al..)	14,762	22,962	41,035	15,365	10,591	20,461	21,402	17,816	20,318	12,457	16,590	21,635	23,096	9,193	267,683	46.43%	5
Mahajana Eksath Peramuna	205	156	425	107	355	402	129	240	474	68	75	384	288	187	3,495	0.61%	0
Sri Lanka Progressive Front (Note: Including the JVP.)	144	174	546	92	140	318	211	186	286	99	93	311	350	122	3,072	0.53%	0
Independent Group 1	14	30	46	16	8	26	22	20	14	17	25	13	15	4	270	0.05%	0
Independent Group 2	10	16	35	13	7	10	12	21	17	15	17	17	15	3	208	0.04%	0
Valid votes	33,375	51,280	84,443	37,734	24,443	43,651	48,612	43,754	42,114	26,064	34,916	43,946	45,366	16,854	576,552	100.00%	12
Rejected votes	1,648	3,117	4,352	2,611	843	2,434	3,148	2,731	1,610	1,766	2,149	2,238	2,122	250	31,019		
Total polled	35,023	54,397	88,795	40,345	25,286	46,085	51,760	46,485	43,724	27,830	37,065	46,184	47,488	17,104	607,571		
Registered electors	43,462	66,812	109,246	50,376	32,335	56,925	62,996	57,482	55,740	32,992	42,700	56,671	58,455		726,192		
Turnout	80.58%	81.42%	81.28%	80.09%	78.20%	80.96%	82.16%	80.87%	78.44%	84.35%	86.80%	81.49%	81.24%		83.67%		

The following candidates were elected:

Preferential votes
Alliance	Party	Candidate	Votes
UNP	UNP	Gamini Dissanayake (Note: Gamini Dissanayake (UNP) was murdered on 24 October 1994.)	198,207
PA	SLFP	D. M. Jayaratne	101,558
PA	SLFP	Anuruddha Ratwatte	92,644
UNP	UNP	Lucky Jayawardena	66,340
UNP	UNP	A. R. M. Abdul Cader	66,136
PA	SLFP	Wilson Kuruppuarachchi	63,969
UNP	UNP	A. C. S. Hameed	61,906
UNP	UNP	Tissa Attanayake	60,531
PA	SLFP	Lakshman Kiriella	59,463
UNP	UNP	Sarath Amunugama	53,997
PA	SLFP	Ediriweera Weerawardena	53,192
UNP	CWC	Sivasamy Rajarathnan	38,343

=== 2000 parliamentary general election ===
Results of the 11th parliamentary election held on 10 October 2000 for the district:

Party	Votes per polling division													Postal votes	Total votes	%	Seats
Party	Galagedara	Gampola	Harispattuwa	Hewaheta	Kandy	Kundasale	Nawalapitiya	Pathadumbara	Senkadagala	Teldeniya	Ududumbara	Udunuwara	Yatinuwara	Postal votes	Total votes	%	Seats
People's Alliance (Note: Including the SLFP et al..)	16,051	29,140	34,177	18,695	7,254	21,906	30,259	24,235	17,342	13,881	17,897	19,988	21,793	9,664	282,282	46.66%	6
United National Party	15,399	19,769	35,828	16,021	12,460	22,106	16,089	13,805	20,096	10,373	13,825	19,591	20,405	7,856	243,623	40.27%	5
National Unity Alliance (Note: Including the SLMC.)	1,048	2,544	10,990	1,564	1,803	883	1,388	3,277	1,469	472	43	4,990	1,341	211	32,023	5.29%	1
Janatha Vimukthi Peramuna	1,144	1,181	3,732	673	1,105	2,315	1,668	1,016	2,027	843	744	1,698	2,082	1,337	21,565	3.56%	0
Sinhala Heritage	331	491	1,592	291	1,722	898	311	521	2,093	156	48	731	1,208	606	10,999	1.82%	0
Ceylon Workers' Congress	9	490	108	1,053	401	967	1,372	454	337	772	46	43	16	40	6,108	1.01%	0
New Left; Front (Note: Including the NSSP et al.)	176	218	329	194	100	157	437	170	168	209	210	207	220	25	2,820	0.47%	0
Citizen's; Front	23	97	99	43	89	176	44	203	74	208	95	43	61	49	1,304	0.22%	0
National Union of Workers	22	132	244	72	51	55	97	77	65	43	8	149	45	6	1,066	0.18%	0
United Sinhala Great Council	53	62	113	47	12	52	69	55	44	59	74	60	48	9	757	0.13%	0
Sinhalaye Mahasammatha Bhoomiputra Pakshaya	20	73	80	12	66	71	41	31	114	11	7	47	80	55	708	0.12%	0
Democratic United National Front	18	34	41	18	7	27	32	17	27	17	25	18	41	1	323	0.05%	0
Liberal; Party	14	15	31	15	18	17	28	19	56	23	32	21	10	2	301	0.05%	0
Independent Group 2	12	24	40	11	18	17	21	13	14	32	12	31	14	5	264	0.04%	0
Independent Group 4	9	7	9	4	9	37	16	9	29	4	14	12	11	9	179	0.03%	0
Sri Lanka Muslim Party	9	14	26	3	11	14	13	8	11	3	9	6	26	8	161	0.03%	0
Independent Group 5	7	11	16	8	9	10	16	8	9	13	9	4	3	0	123	0.02%	0
Independent Group	2	5	20	5	5	7	7	8	6	7	7	18	4	2	103	0.02%	0
Ruhunu People's Party	2	9	11	5	6	3	10	7	1	6	2	7	9	0	78	0.01%	0
National Development Front	5	4	13	3	3	7	11	4	7	3	5	4	6	1	76	0.01%	0
Independent Group 3	3	2	13	5	8	7	7	1	4	1	4	4	4	2	65	0.01%	0
Valid votes	34,357	54,322	87,512	38,742	25,157	49,732	51,936	43,938	43,993	27,136	33,116	47,672	47,427	19,888	604,928	100.00%	12
Rejected votes	2,099	4,055	6,340	3,268	1,136	3,289	4,060	2,334	2,373	2,578	3,473	3,171	2,972	600	41,748		
Total polled	36,456	58,377	93,852	42,010	26,293	53,021	55,996	46,272	46,366	29,714	36,589	50,843	50,399	20,488	646,676		
Registered electors	47,418	75,067	122,891	56,465	34,559	67,435	70,727	64,618	60,032	37,031	48,095	63,837	64,303		812,478		
Turnout	76.88%	77.77%	76.37%	74.40%	76.08%	78.63%	79.17%	71.61%	77.24%	80.24%	76.08%	79.65%	78.38%		79.59%		

The following candidates were elected:

Preferential votes
Alliance	Party	Candidate	Votes
UNP	UNP	Keheliya Rambukwella	154,403
PA	SLFP	Anuruddha Ratwatte	152,511
PA	SLFP	D. M. Jayaratne	85,711
UNP	UNP	Tissa Attanayake	73,111
PA	SLFP	Mahindananda Aluthgamage	71,653
PA	SLFP	Sarath Amunugama	67,731
UNP	UNP	A. R. M. Abdul Cader	58,375
PA	SLFP	Lakshman Kiriella	57,424
UNP	UNP	M. H. A. Haleem	47,271
UNP	UNP	Lucky Jayawardena	42,085
PA	SLFP	Ediriweera Weerawardena	35,388
NUA	SLMC	Rauff Hakeem	28,033

=== 2001 parliamentary general election ===
Results of the 12th parliamentary election held on 5 December 2001 for the district:

Party	Votes per polling division													Postal votes	Total votes	%	Seats
Party	Galagedara	Gampola	Harispattuwa	Hewaheta	Kandy	Kundasale	Nawalapitiya	Pathadumbara	Senkadagala	Teldeniya	Ududumbara	Udunuwara	Yatinuwara	Postal votes	Total votes	%	Seats
United National Front (Note: Including the UNP, SLMC, CWC, WPF.)	18,180	25,089	53,249	14,055	16,764	26,815	22,110	19,461	25,140	13,792	17,477	28,101	24,871	9,193	314,297	52.77%	7
People's Alliance (Note: Including the SLFP et al.)	13,721	24,798	28,636	10,371	6,489	18,908	25,630	19,911	15,289	11,276	14,110	15,990	20,318	8,190	233,637	39.23%	4
Janatha Vimukthi Peramuna	1,688	2,168	7,496	996	1,551	3,355	2,811	2,071	3,254	1,697	1,695	2,859	3,243	2,262	37,146	6.24%	1
Sinhala Heritage	119	228	595	72	551	331	195	187	653	59	55	292	508	195	4,040	0.68%	0
New Left; Front (Note: Including the NSSP et al.)	214	467	503	192	89	282	435	270	219	268	290	294	344	38	3,905	0.66%	0
Muslim United Liberation Front	50	75	128	30	13	42	63	40	35	42	33	37	50	3	641	0.11%	0
United Sinhala Great Council	32	41	83	30	12	38	64	50	24	46	62	45	36	5	568	0.10%	0
National Development Front	3	28	17	14	22	18	18	6	34	13	12	18	38	12	253	0.04%	0
People's Freedom Front	10	27	28	8	5	10	37	7	10	12	23	19	15	1	212	0.04%	0
Sinhalaye Mahasammatha Bhoomiputra Pakshaya	8	22	22	4	14	22	15	5	29	4	4	19	12	10	190	0.03%	0
Independent Group 2	6	7	19	5	14	21	8	8	29	3	3	11	2	5	141	0.02%	0
Independent Group 1	6	8	14	3	3	9	9	10	6	3	12	7	12	3	105	0.02%	0
Independent Group 6	6	6	15	8	4	10	12	9	6	4	7	5	5	1	98	0.02%	0
Independent Group 4	2	4	11	2	3	10	10	5	5	3	3	12	6	1	77	0.01%	0
Independent Group 3	4	3	15	5	1	3	4	1	3	5	7	5	6	2	64	0.01%	0
Ruhunu People's Party	2	6	16	1	0	4	7	2	2	4	1	16	1	0	62	0.01%	0
Sri Lanka National Front	2	3	5	1	2	3	7	2	2	2	8	5	6	0	48	0.01%	0
Sri Lanka Progressive Front	3	3	7	4	0	4	12	3	4	1	1	3	3	0	48	0.01%	0
Independent Group 5	4	2	10	3	1	2	6	4	1	0	3	5	3	0	44	0.01%	0
Valid votes	34,060	52,985	90,869	25,804	25,538	49,887	51,453	42,052	44,745	27,234	33,806	47,743	49,479	19,921	595,576	100.00%	12
Rejected votes	2,032	4,338	6,813	2,230	1,152	3,413	3,780	3,069	2,252	2,780	3,946	3,068	2,512	718	42,103	6.6%	
Total polled	36,092	57,323	97,682	28,034	26,690	53,300	55,233	45,121	46,997	30,014	37,752	50,811	51,991	20,639	637,679	76.03%	
Registered electors	48,642	77,854	126,815	57,850	35,351	70,383	72,986	67,327	61,677	37,897	49,524	65,863	66,518		838,687		
Turnout	74.20%	73.63%	77.03%	48.46%	75.50%	75.73%	75.68%	67.02%	76.20%	79.20%	76.23%	77.15%	78.16%		76.03%		

The following candidates were elected:

Preferential votes
Alliance	Party	Candidate	Votes
UNF	UNP	Keheliya Rambukwella	143,235
PA	SLFP	Anuruddha Ratwatte	102,906
UNF	UNP	Tissa Attanayake	99,381
PA	SLFP	Sarath Amunugama	78,110
UNF	UNP	M. H. A. Haleem	75,630
UNF	SLMC	Rauff Hakeem	71,094
UNF	UNP	Lakshman Kiriella	70,241
UNF	UNP	Chithra Srimathi Manthilake	51,768
PA	SLFP	Thilina Bandara Tennakoon	51,542
PA	SLFP	Mahindananda Aluthgamage	50,618
UNF	UNP	Lucky Jayawardena	45,693
JVP	JVP	Dimuthu Bandara Abayakoon	5,967

=== 2004 parliamentary general election ===
Results of the 13th parliamentary election held on 2 April 2004 for the district:

Party	Votes per polling division													Postal votes	Total votes	%	Seats
Party	Galagedara	Gampola	Harispattuwa	Hewaheta	Kandy	Kundasale	Nawalapitiya	Pathadumbara	Senkadagala	Teldeniya	Ududumbara	Udunuwara	Yatinuwara	Postal votes	Total votes	%	Seats
United National Front (Note: Including the UNP, SLMC, CWC, WPF.)	16,645	30,109	46,572	22,724	14,367	24,807	25,823	26,230	22,435	13,380	15,285	23,413	22,647	9,422	313,859	49.99%	6
United People's Freedom Alliance (Note: Including the SLFP, JVP.)	15,896	22,066	37,806	16,277	7,141	23,918	22,708	16,071	17,403	13,321	18,319	21,739	22,887	12,579	268,131	42.71%	5
Jathika Hela Urumaya	1,513	2,515	7,079	1,253	3,959	3,896	1,793	2,946	6,191	674	307	3,678	4,376	2,012	42,192	6.72%	1
National Development Front	43	63	183	77	70	112	61	75	127	27	20	134	96	21	1,109	0.18%	0
United Muslim People's Party	30	68	93	39	12	40	55	45	26	28	26	41	38	7	548	0.09%	0
New Left; Front (Note: Including the NSSP.)	11	34	84	22	59	28	44	31	61	9	12	34	51	21	501	0.08%	0
United Socialist Party	19	30	56	28	15	20	35	33	11	14	15	25	18	5	324	0.05%	0
Independent Group 9	18	18	24	18	3	18	39	20	7	10	24	21	12	1	233	0.04%	0
Independent Group 7	5	13	52	3	10	22	10	11	16	3	11	11	6	5	178	0.03%	0
United Lalith Front	3	16	20	14	3	14	14	12	10	7	7	11	14	2	147	0.02%	0
Independent Group 8	9	16	18	8	3	7	16	12	6	10	7	11	5	1	129	0.02%	0
Swarajya; Party	28	3	25	2	5	4	2	10	13	1	3	2	5	0	103	0.02%	0
Sinhalaye Mahasammatha Bhoomiputra Pakshaya	3	6	10	7	2	3	2	7	11	0	2	4	20	4	81	0.01%	0
Sri Lanka Muslim Party	4	3	20	0	3	1	6	2	4	1	1	8	0	0	53	0.01%	0
Sri Lanka National Front	3	4	5	5	0	3	6	5	1	5	1	5	4	1	48	0.01%	0
Independent Group 6	1	3	3	3	2	3	10	7	5	2	1	2	1	0	43	0.01%	0
Independent Group 1	3	2	4	3	2	1	2	7	3	0	1	4	1	4	37	0.01%	0
Independent Group 5	4	4	5	3	2	3	2	5	1	2	1	1	1	1	35	0.01%	0
Independent Group 3	0	1	6	2	1	0	3	1	1	2	1	3	7	1	29	0.00%	0
Independent Group 4	0	1	5	5	0	5	1	2	2	1	1	2	1	0	26	0.00%	0
Ruhuna People's Party	0	2	1	5	0	2	3	1	1	3	3	3	0	0	24	0.00%	0
Sri Lanka Progressive Front	0	1	6	2	0	0	3	1	1	2	0	3	1	0	20	0.00%	0
Independent Group 2	3	1	1	0	0	0	4	2	2	1	1	0	1	0	16	0.00%	0
Valid votes	34,241	54,979	92,078	40,500	25,659	52,907	50,642	45,536	46,338	27,503	34,049	49,155	50,192	24,087	627,866	100.00%	12
Rejected votes	2,523	4,415	6,988	3,423	1,123	3,607	4,421	4,250	2,424	2,685	3,749	2,999	2,465	412	45,484		
Total polled	36,764	59,394	99,066	43,923	26,782	56,514	55,063	49,786	48,762	30,188	37,798	52,154	52,657	24,499	673,350		
Registered electors	49,964	81,694	133,404	59,853	36,760	74,784	76,700	69,554	66,995	39,730	51,360	69,844	69,992		880,634		
Turnout	73.58%	72.70%	74.26%	73.38%	72.86%	75.57%	71.79%	71.58%	72.78%	75.98%	73.59%	74.67%	75.23%		76.46%		

The following candidates were elected:

Preferential votes
Alliance	Party	Candidate	Votes
UPFA	JVP	Dimuthu Bandara Abayakoon	111,923
UNF	UNP	Keheliya Rambukwella	110,720
UNF	UNP	Tissa Attanayake	93,971
UNF	UNP	A. R. M. Abdul Cader	89,829
UPFA	SLFP	Mahindananda Aluthgamage	82,036
UNF	UNP	Lakshman Kiriella	81,136
UPFA	JVP	Y. M. Nawartna Banda	81,036
UPFA	SLFP	Sarath Amunugama	78,817
UNF	UNP	M. H. A. Haleem	66,669
UPFA	SLFP	D. M. Jayaratne	64,317
UNF	CWC	Faiszer Musthapha	40,475
JHU	JHU	Ven.Udawatte Nanda Thero	10,846

=== 2010 parliamentary general election ===
Results of the 14th parliamentary election held on 8 April 2010 for the district:

Party	Votes per polling division													Postal votes	Total votes	%	Seats
Party	Galagedara	Gampola	Harispattuwa	Hewaheta	Kandy	Kundasale	Nawalapitiya	Pathadumbara	Senkadagala	Teldeniya	Ududumbara	Udunuwara	Yatinuwara	Postal votes	Total votes	%	Seats
United People's Freedom Alliance (Note: Including the SLFP.)	18,198	27,843	46,026	20,848	9,187	26,070	38,153	23,956	21,431	14,275	20,851	26,154	26,419	20,408	339,819	60.77%	8
United National Front (Note: Including the UNP, SLMC, DPF, SLFP(P).)	8,836	19,144	30,124	13,145	10,226	16,282	11,648	16,214	15,411	7,732	7,544	15,590	14,621	6,281	192,798	34.48%	4
Democratic National Alliance (Note: Including the JVP, DNF et al.)	1,209	1,228	3,551	736	1,454	2,775	1,128	1,477	2,965	800	521	1,949	1,983	1,952	23,728	4.24%	0
Sri Lanka National Front	10	13	62	35	54	205	2	132	280	39	13	23	15	38	921	0.16%	0
National Development Front	27	75	87	34	13	56	19	48	21	17	22	27	50	9	505	0.09%	0
United National Alternative Front	15	31	38	23	5	22	11	34	13	9	12	16	11	5	245	0.04%	0
Independent Group 17	3	17	13	7	0	10	14	11	1	7	13	6	5	1	108	0.02%	0
Independent Group 11	6	13	4	14	4	11	6	10	12	4	2	4	3	2	95	0.02%	0
Independent Group 4	2	7	5	3	1	8	16	10	8	4	4	0	3	1	72	0.01%	0
Left Liberation Front	1	7	5	1	6	5	2	2	4	3	2	8	18	2	66	0.01%	0
Patriotic National Front	8	2	9	5	1	7	8	1	2	3	3	6	6	1	62	0.01%	0
Independent Group 5	2	10	12	5	1	2	4	5	3	3	2	3	4	2	58	0.01%	0
United Lanka Great Council	3	5	7	2	2	3	4	8	6	2	6	5	2	1	56	0.01%	0
Independent Group 8	1	1	4	1	1	4	2	4	6	9	18	2	1	1	55	0.01%	0
Independent Group 13	0	12	14	1	1	2	2	4	4	1	5	3	2	3	54	0.01%	0
Independent Group 2	2	1	6	1	2	3	5	7	14	1	3	4	4	0	53	0.01%	0
Muslim Liberation Front	3	2	20	2	1	4	4	1	2	2	4	2	2	1	50	0.01%	0
Independent Group 1	6	7	7	4	1	5	3	1	3	5	1	2	3	0	48	0.01%	0
Ceylon Democratic Unity Alliance	4	8	4	2	1	5	8	5	0	0	3	3	1	4	48	0.01%	0
Janasetha Peramuna	4	0	5	2	4	5	4	1	2	1	2	8	4	3	45	0.01%	0
Independent Group 12	0	3	4	2	1	3	1	1	1	4	19	2	1	2	44	0.01%	0
Independent Group 9	2	1	4	3	0	10	2	3	1	2	3	6	4	3	44	0.01%	0
Independent Group 14	3	7	8	1	0	2	5	1	2	3	1	4	2	0	39	0.01%	0
Independent Group 16	3	3	8	4	0	2	5	3	0	2	2	1	4	1	38	0.01%	0
Independent Group 15	0	3	6	1	0	2	6	2	3	2	2	4	2	2	35	0.01%	0
Independent Group 6	1	5	5	0	10	2	1	1	2	2	1	1	1	2	34	0.01%	0
Sri Lanka Labour Party	0	3	5	1	1	5	2	2	4	0	0	0	2	1	26	0.00%	0
Sinhalaye Mahasammatha Bhoomiputra Pakshaya	1	1	0	0	1	2	8	3	2	3	0	1	2	1	25	0.00%	0
Independent Group 3	2	4	3	1	0	2	1	0	1	3	0	2	3	0	22	0.00%	0
Independent Group 10	2	2	6	2	2	1	0	1	0	0	0	3	1	0	20	0.00%	0
Independent Group 7	0	1	4	0	0	0	2	2	1	1	1	0	0	1	13	0.00%	0
Valid votes	28,354	48,459	80,056	34,886	20,980	45,515	51,076	41,950	40,205	22,939	29,060	43,839	43,179	28,728	559,226	100.00%	12
Rejected votes	3,007	6,780	8,345	4,763	1,389	4,783	4,262	5,177	2,935	3,540	4,163	4,043	3,862	1,284	58,333		
Total polled	31,361	55,239	88,401	39,649	22,369	50,298	55,338	47,127	43,140	26,479	33,223	47,882	47,041	30,012	617,559		
Registered electors	52,553	91,146	147,475	65,176	36,938	85,857	85,136	78,688	72,906	45,144	55,629	76,812	76,996		970,456		
Turnout	59.67%	60.60%	59.94%	60.83%	60.56%	58.58%	65.00%	59.89%	59.17%	58.65%	59.72%	62.34%	61.10%		63.64%		

The following candidates were elected:

Preferential votes
Alliance	Party	Candidate	Votes
UPFA	SLFP	Mahindananda Aluthgamage	146,765
UPFA	UNP	Keheliya Rambukwella	133,060
UPFA	UNP	S. B. Dissanayake	108,169
UPFA	SLFP	Lohan Ratwatte	81,812
UPFA	UNP	A. R. M. Abdul Cader	54,937
UPFA	SLFP	Erik Weerawardena	54,195
UNF	SLMC	Rauff Hakeem	54,047
UNF	UNP	Lakshman Kiriella	53,690
UNF	UNP	M. H. A. Haleem	48,588
UPFA	SLFP	Dilum Amunugama	45,909
UPFA	SLFP	Faiszer Musthapha	44,648
UPFA	SLFP	Sarath Amunugama	44,478

=== 2015 parliamentary general election ===
Results of the 15th parliamentary election held on 17 August 2015:

Party	Votes per polling division													Postal votes	Total votes	%	Seats
Party	Galagedara	Gampola	Harispattuwa	Hewaheta	Kandy	Kundasale	Nawalapitiya	Pathadumbara	Senkadagala	Teldeniya	Ududumbara	Udunuwara	Yatinuwara	Postal votes	Total votes	%	Seats
United National Front for Good Governance (Note: The alliance consisted of ACMC, DNM, JHU, MTNA, NFGG, SLMC, TPA (DPF, NUW and UCPF), ULF and UNP.)	19,522	42,657	63,853	28,115	18,346	37,355	37,611	35,619	32,354	17,501	19,674	35,580	29,310	23,264	440,761	55.57%	7
United People's Freedom Alliance (Note: The alliance consisted of CF, DNF, DPC, LPSL, MEP, NC, NFF, PHU, SA (CPSL, DLF, LSSP, NLPP and SLPP), SLFP, TMVP and UCF.)	17,231	27,025	42,799	18,029	8,396	26,637	25,672	20,822	21,775	14,454	21,919	20,808	24,986	18,626	309,152	38.98%	5
Janatha Vimukthi Peramuna	1,287	1,583	4,459	1,059	1,497	3,250	2,157	1,779	3,211	962	876	2,307	2,823	3,419	30,669	3.87%	0
Ceylon Workers' Congress	3	1,399	43	415	28	189	719	944	24	480	9	7	11	129	4,400	0.55%	0
Democratic Party	110	154	463	98	119	279	469	196	167	35	61	148	193	279	2771	0.35%	0
Bodu Jana Peramuna	80	189	455	138	120	197	120	168	194	35	25	265	183	136	2,305	0.29%	0
Independent Group 07	51	72	127	42	9	41	65	65	26	45	62	48	51	2	706	0.09%	0
United People's Party	15	57	68	38	18	24	73	48	31	34	44	39	22	6	517	0.07%	0
Frontline Socialist Party	8	21	100	5	8	24	18	24	21	14	3	47	25	31	349	0.04%	0
United Socialist Party	14	54	50	13	11	31	58	29	12	14	8	24	21	6	345	0.04%	0
Independent Group 05	7	17	24	13	3	21	36	11	10	8	10	27	16	0	203	0.03%	0
Janasetha Peramuna	9	4	61	4	4	18	5	12	6	4	0	17	4	7	155	0.02%	0
All Citizens All Kings Organization	1	11	6	4	8	68	5	13	10	1	2	7	4	14	154	0.02%	0
Independent Group 02	4	9	15	6	4	4	21	2	8	2	4	8	2	1	90	0.01%	0
Independent Group 06	6	4	9	8	2	6	15	14	1	5	2	4	5	1	82	0.01%	0
United Peace Front	2	8	21	4	4	7	12	1	2	3	0	4	3	1	72	0.01%	0
United Lanka People's Party	7	9	13	4	1	6	9	7	4	3	0	3	1	0	67	0.01%	0
New Sinhala Heritage	3	3	19	7	3	0	7	5	1	3	2	1	4	2	60	0.01%	0
Independent Group 01	2	4	10	1	4	2	5	10	1	2	2	5	1	1	53	0.01%	0
Independent Group 04	7	2	3	2	1	2	5	3	3	1	1	4	10	0	47	0.01%	0
Sri Lanka National Force	4	4	6	1	0	2	5	5	3	2	1	1	11	1	46	0.01%	0
Independent Group 03	0	9	7	4	0	3	8	4	3	1	6	1	1	1	41	0.01%	0
Muslim National Alliance	2	5	5	4	1	2	2	6	1	2	3	0	0	0	33	0.00%	0
Motherland People's Party	0	2	6	2	1	2	2	2	2	1	0	2	0	0	22	0.00%	0
Valid votes	38,375	73,301	112,622	48,016	28,561	68,170	67,099	57,789	57,870	33,612	42,714	59,357	57,686	45,928	793,100	100.00%	12
Rejected votes	1,558	4,204	5,126	2,903	721	2,695	5,101	3,406	1,604	2,195	2,368	2,365	2,067	752	37,065	4.46%	
Total polled	39,933	77,505	117,748	50,919	29,282	70,865	72,200	63,195	59,474	35,807	45,082	61,722	59,753	46,680	830,165	79.13%	
Registered electors	52,214	102,219	157,463	69,243	40,020	94,870	95,567	85,375	81,149	47,685	58,637	82,298	80,420		1,049,160		

Preferential votes
Alliance	Party	Candidate	Votes
UNFGG	UNP	Lakshman Kiriella	199,046
UPFA	SLFP	Lohan Ratwatte	129,750
UPFA	SLFP	Mahindananda Aluthgamage	123,393
UNFGG	UNP	Mayantha Dissanayake	111,190
UNFGG	UNP	M. H. A. Haleem	111,011
UPFA	SLFP	Dilum Amunugama	104,469
UNFGG	SLMC	Rauff Hakeem	102,186
UPFA	SLFP	Anuradha Jayaratne	93,567
UPFA	SLFP	Keheliya Rambukwella	65,687
UNFGG	UNP	Lucky Jayawardena	65,461
UNFGG	DPF	M. Velu Kumar	62,556
UNFGG	UNP	Ananda Aluthgamage	56,625

=== 2020 parliamentary general election ===
Results of the 16th parliamentary election held on 5 August 2020:

Party	Votes per polling division													Postal votes	Total votes	%	Seats
Party	Galagedara	Gampola	Harispattuwa	Hewaheta	Kandy	Kundasale	Nawalapitiya	Pathadumbara	Senkadagala	Teldeniya	Ududumbara	Udunuwara	Yatinuwara	Postal votes	Total votes	%	Seats
Sri Lanka People's Freedom Alliance (Note: The alliance consisted of SLFP, CWC, CPSL, DLF, DVJP, EPDP, LSSP, MEP, MTK, NC, NFF, PHU, SLMP, SLPP, TMVP, UPP & VDJS.)	24,888	41,759	61,159	27,733	13,337	40,939	43,629	32,456	32,433	20,486	28,630	35,786	38,839	35,372	477,446	58.76%	8
Samagi Jana Balawegaya (Note: The alliance consisted of JHU, SLMC, TPA (NUW, DPF, UCPF), ACMC, NLNP & JSP.)	8,575	26,331	35,532	16,963	9,366	18,707	21,538	20,438	15,502	10,391	12,410	17,732	12,532	8,511	234,523	28.86%	4
Independent Group 01	949	2,101	3,457	1,437	698	4,401	1,269	2,168	2,221	1,595	619	2,142	2,000	814	25,797	3.17%	0
National People's Power (Note: Including JVP.)	948	1,276	2,712	594	1,339	2,528	1,431	1,222	2,890	601	937	1,753	1,831	2,935	22,997	2.83%	0
United National Party	645	1,937	2,290	1,437	1,234	1,555	1,327	1,604	1,665	635	450	1,567	1,257	1,409	19,012	2.34%	0
Independent Group 11	198	1,382	8,199	378	318	189	315	1,218	323	127	110	580	226	201	13,672	1.68%	0
Our Power of People's Party	188	406	1,552	439	311	572	425	1,065	618	114	152	436	567	433	7,288	0.9%	0
National Development Front	189	208	288	140	74	174	252	169	142	101	138	122	128	47	2,012	0.25%	0
Jana Setha Peramuna	44	114	98	79	16	55	99	104	34	55	67	67	56	18	906	0.11%	0
Independent Group 06	21	46	29	56	196	64	67	176	109	48	25	14	8	41	900	0.11%	0
Socialist Party of Sri Lanka	55	90	109	56	21	61	109	72	60	59	66	55	52	10	875	0.11%	0
Independent Group 02	36	90	91	56	14	61	101	59	28	36	62	68	33	27	762	0.09%	0
Frontline Socialist Party	25	48	129	30	12	54	63	63	29	29	20	99	36	51	688	0.08%	0
National People's Party	26	48	64	42	20	47	69	48	31	30	50	74	39	24	612	0.08%	0
National Democratic Front	67	38	70	30	9	42	67	54	23	36	47	43	38	15	579	0.07%	0
Independent Group 10	32	47	111	34	7	37	47	48	31	34	27	36	32	12	535	0.07%	0
Sinhaladeepa National Front	16	31	105	59	17	32	61	30	40	13	21	30	16	51	522	0.06%	0
Sri Lanka Labour Party	24	54	54	32	12	29	58	66	27	25	40	31	21	13	486	0.06%	0
All Citizens are All Kings Organization	20	43	79	20	12	32	41	35	32	22	22	35	23	10	426	0.05%	0
Independent Group 12	16	48	79	17	13	24	52	62	18	26	17	22	15	15	424	0.05%	0
New Sinhala Heritage	20	29	46	18	20	27	26	51	20	20	16	36	28	42	399	0.05%	0
Independent Group 07	19	46	39	30	10	21	29	33	12	30	23	27	12	5	336	0.04%	0
Democratic United National Front	20	40	18	13	11	39	26	29	16	22	26	18	13	28	319	0.04%	0
Independent Group 03	10	24	36	15	5	15	36	31	17	18	19	12	10	5	253	0.03%	0
Motherland People's Party	6	16	25	14	1	21	24	25	15	12	9	10	16	9	203	0.02%	0
Independent Group 09	11	17	18	14	5	15	16	15	13	19	12	5	6	5	171	0.02%	0
Independent Group 05	14	12	20	8	11	17	14	9	11	7	11	8	14	12	168	0.02%	0
Independent Group 08	7	16	14	7	7	6	10	13	6	29	6	6	10	2	139	0.02%	0
Independent Group 04	6	11	14	16	0	10	11	26	3	6	8	5	5	4	126	0.02%	0
Valid votes	36,915	76,308	116,357	49,693	27,096	69,774	71,207	61,389	56,369	34,626	44,040	60,819	57,863	50,122	812,578	100.00%	12
Rejected votes	2,365	6,885	7,908	4,438	1,167	4,743	6,053	5,063	3,061	3,262	3,423	3,724	2,779	2,220	57,091	5.06%	
Total polled	39,280	83,193	124,265	54,131	28,263	74,517	77,260	66,452	59,430	37,888	47,463	64,543	60,642	52,342	869,669	77.02%	
Registered electors	52,073	107,217	162,717	70,373	40,471	99,506	98,425	87,639	83,715	48,329	58,588	84,711	81,284	54,054	1,129,100		

Preferential votes
Alliance	Party	Candidate	Votes
SLPFA	SLPP	Dilum Amunugama	171,758
SLPFA	SLPP	Mahindananda Aluthgamage	161,471
SLPFA	SLPP	Lohan Ratwatte	140,917
SLPFA	SLPP	Anuradha Jayaratne	140,798
SLPFA	SLPP	Keheliya Rambukwella	110,832
SLPFA	SLPP	Wasantha Yapa Bandara	108,940
SJB	SLMC	Rauff Hakeem	83,398
SJB	SJB	M. H. A. Haleem	71,063
SJB	DPF	M. Velu Kumar	57,445
SJB	SJB	Lakshman Kiriella	52,311
SLPFA	SLPP	Gunathilaka Rajapaksha	49,317
SLPFA	SLPP	Udayana Kirindigoda	39,904

== Provincial council elections ==
=== 1988 provincial council election ===
Results of the 1st Central provincial council election held on 2 June 1988

Party	Total votes	%	Seats
United National Party	195,259	60.46%	17
United Socialist Alliance (Note: Including the CPSL, LSSP, NSSP & SLMP)	98,493	30.5%	9
Sri Lanka Muslim Congress	29,198	9.04%	2
Valid votes	322,950	100.00%	28

=== 1993 provincial council election ===
Results of the 2nd Central provincial council election held on 17 May 1993:

Party	Votes	%	Seats
United National Party	252,926	49.78%	14
People's Alliance (Note: Including the SLFP et al.)	155,298	30.57%	9
Democratic United National Front	90,366	17.79%	5
Sri Lanka Muslim Congress	6,079	1.19%	0
Nava Sama Samaja Party	3,382	0.67%	0
Valid votes	508,051	100.00%	28

=== 1999 provincial council election ===
Results of the 3rd Central provincial council election held on 6 April 1999 for the district:

Party	Votes per polling division													Postal votes	Total votes	%	Seats
Party	Galagedara	Gampola	Harispattuwa	Hewaheta	Kandy	Kundasale	Nawalapitiya	Pathadumbara	Senkadagala	Teldeniya	Ududumbara	Udunuwara	Yatinuwara	Postal votes	Total votes	%	Seats
People's Alliance (Note: Including the SLFP.)	14,412	23,298	34,377	18,390	7,988	17,053	26,220	21,166	15,840	11,368	16,095	17,760	18,732	4,551	247,250	47.51%	13
United National Party	13,736	20,227	35,903	15,266	11,040	20,053	14,947	13,419	17,760	10,024	13,419	19,480	18,643	4,410	232,934	46.04%	13
National Union of Workers	50	2,716	267	2,238	1,085	1,617	3,481	2,897	741	1,477	113	95	135	42	16,954	3.26%	1
Janatha Vimukthi Peramuna	995	982	2,761	558	899	1,616	1,301	1,045	1,509	671	746	1,288	1,346	348	16,065	3.09%	1
Mahajana Eksath Peramuna	109	155	518	106	802	651	141	330	830	93	102	269	331	196	4,433	0.85%	0
Liberal Party	45	72	134	68	30	74	91	80	33	83	80	55	55	1	881	0.17%	0
Independent Group	27	69	174	57	38	59	70	64	49	37	41	56	96	16	853	0.16%	0
Sri Lanka Progressive Front	36	30	79	32	16	30	39	36	41	25	26	151	133	15	689	0.13%	0
Valid votes	29,410	47,549	74,213	36,715	21,698	41,153	46,290	43,264	36,803	23,778	30,622	39,154	39,471	9,579	520,659	100.00%	28
Rejected votes	2,024	4,494	6,736	3,225	1,526	3,508	4,409	4,158	2,882	2,296	2,654	3,201	3,195	692	45,000	7.96%	
Total polled	31,434	52,043	80,949	39,940	23,224	44,661	50,699	47,782	39,485	26,074	33,476	42,355	42,666	10,271	565,059	72.42%	
Registered electors	45,997	71,328	117,613	53,927	34,640	63,678	87,877	62,149	58,745	35,580	45,900	61,229	61,559		780,232		

The following candidates were elected:

Preferential votes
Party	Candidate	Votes
UNP	Keheliya Rambukwella	141,552
PA	Mahindananda Aluthgamage	51,558
UNP	Chithra Srimathi Manthilake	43,519
UNP	M. H. A. Haleem	38,283
PA	Thilina Bandara Thennakoon	34,375
PA	Mahinda Abeykoon	30,073
PA	Kamal Ajith Kumara	25,831
PA	Anura Fernando	24,653
PA	Chaminda Kuruppuarachchi	24,210
UNP	Mahinda Wijesiri	22,440
UNP	W. M. P. B. Dissanayake	21,919
PA	Sunil Kithsiri Amaratunga	21,077
UNP	H. L. M. Rafeek	21,014
PA	M. T. M. Ameen	20,730
UNP	A. M. S. M. Shafie	20,359
PA	R. B. Herath	20,339
PA	M. G. Jayaratne	19,450
UNP	Karunarathne Bandara	19,185
UNP	Rupa Sriyani Daniel	19,098
PA	H. A. Ranasinghe	18,761
PA	S. M. R. B. Samarakoon	18,576
PA	A. G. Sirisena	18,488
UNP	Kesera Senanayake	16,790
UNP	Sarath Piyadasa	16,411
UNP	Jayaweera Bandara	16,347
UNP	H. L. M. Jaufer	13,478
NUW	Thureysami Madiyugaraja	10,277
JVP	A. R. G. Dharmaratne	1,794

=== 2004 provincial council election ===
Results of the 4th Central provincial council election held on 10 July 2004 for the district:

Party	Votes per polling division													Postal votes	Total votes	%	Seats
Party	Galagedara	Gampola	Harispattuwa	Hewaheta	Kandy	Kundasale	Nawalapitiya	Pathadumbara	Senkadagala	Teldeniya	Ududumbara	Udunuwara	Yatinuwara	Postal votes	Total votes	%	Seats
United People's Freedom Alliance (Note: Including the SLFP, JVP.)	15,546	20,406	36,289	15,423	6,150	23,101	23,296	14,108	15,294	13,752	18,607	17,582	16,901	8,140	244,595	54.17%	16
United National Party	10,504	18,564	29,938	16,541	9,468	14,656	14,220	16,850	14,353	10,270	10,526	14,605	16,834	4,935	202,264	44.80%	14
National Development Front	54	69	100	49	20	106	62	144	100	45	38	390	132	51	1,360	0.30%	0
United Socialist Party	67	98	157	82	49	86	116	127	49	59	43	71	70	14	1,088	0.24%	0
United Muslim People's Alliance	27	73	372	38	68	32	53	96	36	22	22	72	71	5	987	0.22%	0
Sinhalaye Mahasammatha Bhoomiputra Pakshaya	12	31	43	13	51	32	21	28	47	12	6	29	49	45	419	0.09%	0
Independent Group 2	22	27	36	21	1	14	26	18	15	19	13	15	15	5	247	0.05%	0
National Democratic Party	6	13	21	10	23	8	25	15	15	6	6	10	6	14	178	0.04%	0
Ruhunu People's Party	5	8	41	10	2	6	6	7	9	3	3	10	35	16	161	0.04%	0
Independent Group 1	10	9	20	7	3	12	11	10	11	12	11	12	8	7	143	0.03%	0
Sri Lanka Progressive Front	4	11	11	2	4	2	4	6	12	3	1	6	6	4	76	0.02%	0
Valid votes	26,257	39,309	67,028	32,196	15,839	38,055	37,840	31,409	29,941	24,203	29,276	32,802	34,127	13,236	451,518	100.00%	30
Rejected votes	1,567	2,799	4,942	2,424	1,135	2,477	2,872	2,435	2,046	1,641	2,198	2,120	2,022	824	31,502		
Total polled	27,824	42,108	71,970	34,620	16,974	40,532	40,712	33,844	31,987	25,844	31,474	34,922	36,149	14,060	483,020		
Registered electors	49,964	81,695	133,404	59,853	36,760	74,784	76,700	69,554	66,995	39,730	51,360	69,844	69,992		880,635		
Turnout	55.69%	51.54%	53.95%	57.84%	46.18%	54.20%	53.08%	48.66%	47.75%	65.05%	61.28%	50.00%	51.65%		54.85%		

The following candidates were elected:

Preferential votes
Party	Candidate	Votes
UPFA	Dilum Amunugama	48,491
UPFA	Amaranath Samansiri Fernando	39,476
UPFA	Sarath Ekanayake	36,387
UNP	Lucky Jayawardena	31,071
UNP	M. R. M. Hamjad	28,447
UPFA	Ananda Aluthgamage	28,034
UPFA	Mahinda Abeykoon	27,643
UPFA	Ediriweera Weerawardena	27,047
UNP	A. G. M. Saheed	24,991
UPFA	R. G. Samaranayake	24,181
UNP	Thureysami Madiyugaraja	23,519
UNP	Chithra Srimathi Manthilake	23,247
UNP	Mahinda Wijesiri	23,097
UPFA	M. G. Jayaratne	21,577
UPFA	Manel Bandara	21,067
UPFA	Nishshanka Herath	20,658
UPFA	Sunil Wickramasinghe	20,613
UNP	Nihal Gunasekara	20,454
UPFA	A. G. Sirisena	19,651
UNP	Chanaka Ailapperuma	18,185
UPFA	Sunil Kithsiri Amarathunga	18,116
UPFA	H. A. Ranasinghe	17,428
UPFA	P. B. Dissanayake	17,392
UPFA	Chandana Dissanayake	17,099
UNP	Srima Shanthini Kongahage	16,973
UNP	Sivasamy Rajarathnam	14,267
UNP	Padmalal de Alwis	14,071
UNP	M. M. M. Alhaj	13,719
UNP	Rupa Sriyani Daniel	13,203
UNP	A. M. N. Alhaj	13,147

=== 2009 provincial council election ===
Results of the 5th Central provincial council election held on 14 February 2009 for the district:

Party	Votes per polling division													Postal votes	Total votes	%	Seats
Party	Galagedara	Gampola	Harispattuwa	Hewaheta	Kandy	Kundasale	Nawalapitiya	Pathadumbara	Senkadagala	Teldeniya	Ududumbara	Udunuwara	Yatinuwara	Postal votes	Total votes	%	Seats
United People's Freedom Alliance (Note: Including the SLFP .)	21,646	29,628	53,858	22,752	10,243	32,964	32,016	26,629	24,125	17,881	22,911	27,269	28,967	12,601	363,490	59.41%	18
United National Party	10,446	24,745	35,928	16,523	12,146	20,078	16,126	20,309	19,507	9,997	9,906	19,708	18,654	3,754	237,827	38.87%	12
Janatha Vimukthi Peramuna	548	410	1,402	469	355	870	813	333	760	351	398	652	591	341	8,293	1.36%	0
United Socialist Party	24	60	90	34	22	31	83	45	40	21	12	42	35	7	546	0.09%	0
Independent Group 3	15	4	39	27	55	24	9	12	145	3	7	11	14	11	376	0.06%	0
United Lanka People's Party	15	40	35	23	5	16	44	31	18	13	10	24	15	3	292	0.05%	0
Independent Group 1	2	4	29	3	2	8	2	15	6	89	17	8	6	7	198	0.03%	0
Independent Group 8	8	28	24	17	9	13	27	15	9	3	9	11	10	1	184	0.03%	0
Independent Group 7	2	6	13	6	4	4	24	8	3	4	4	5	1	0	84	0.01%	0
United Lanka Great Council	1	7	9	9	1	2	11	4	2	11	4	6	5	3	75	0.01%	0
National People's Party	4	6	9	9	2	4	10	2	1	5	3	6	4	1	66	0.01%	0
Independent Group 5	8	2	9	4	1	7	7	6	5		3	4	0	1	57	0.01%	0
Patriotic National Front	4	5	8	10	2	2	5	1	5	2	2	4	1	5	56	0.01%	0
Independent Group 6	2	5	6	5		10	3	6	2	4	0	4	5	1	53	0.01%	0
Sri Lanka Progressive Front	1	2	5	1	7	4	5	8	5	3	2	2	5	2	52	0.01%	0
Ruhunu People's Party	3	9	2	8	5	7	3	4	3	0	3	1	3	51	0.01%	0	
Independent Group 4	3	5	5	8	2	2	1	4	5	1	4	3	2	0	45	0.01%	0
Independent Group 2	2	3	5	1	2	3	9	6	1	3	3	2	3	0	43	0.01%	0
Valid votes	32,731	54,963	91,483	39,903	22,866	54,047	49,202	47,437	44,643	28,394	33,295	47,764	48,319	16,741	611,788	100.00%	30
Rejected votes	1,399	3,174	4,587	2,674	711	2,476	3,818	3,057	1,696	1,881	1,947	2,048	2,020	341	31,829		
Total polled	34,130	58,137	96,070	42,577	23,577	56,523	53,020	50,494	46,339	30,275	35,242	49,812	50,339	17,082	643,617		
Registered electors	52,169	89,422	145,752	64,133	36,702	84,371	82,686	76,751	71,886	44,057	54,923	75,994	76,262		955,108		
Turnout	65.42%	65.01%	65.91%	66.39%	64.24%	66.99%	64.12%	65.79%	64.46%	68.72%	64.17%	65.55%	66.01%		67.39%		

The following candidates were elected:

Preferential votes
Party	Candidate	Votes
UNP	S. B. Dissanayake	181,783
UPFA	Sarath Ekanayake	99,932
UPFA	Dilum Amunugama	77,179
UPFA	Lohan Ratwatte	70,372
UPFA	Ediriweera Weerawardena	46,903
UPFA	Ananda Aluthgamage	45,178
UPFA	Thilina Bandara Thennakoon	30,476
UPFA	Mahinda Abeykoon	30,170
UPFA	S. M. R. B. Samarakoon	29,686
UPFA	Wilson Kuruppuarachchi	29,637
UPFA	R. G. Samaranayake	28,479
UNP	M. R. M. Hamjad	27,421
UPFA	A. G. Sirisena	26,676
UNP	Jamaldeen Jeilabdeen	26,103
UPFA	Gunathilaka Rajapaksha	25,957
UPFA	Sunil Kithsiri Amaratunga	25,787
UPFA	G. V. Jayawardhana	23,963
UPFA	Nishshanka Herath	23,477
UPFA	Linton Wijesinghe	22,879
UNP	Chanaka Ailapperuma	22,477
UNP	Chithra Srimathi Manthilake	22,063
UPFA	M. G. Jayaratne	21,310
UNP	Lucky Jayawardena	21,028
UPFA	H. A. Ranasinghe	21,011
UNP	Sivasami Rajarathnam	20,228
UNP	S. M. M. Marjan	19,520
UNP	Srima Shanthini Kongahage	18,472
UNP	A. M. S. M. Shafie	18,367
UNP	Nihal Gunasekara	18,115
UNP	Lakshman Wijesiri	16,479

=== 2013 provincial council election ===
Results of the 6th provincial council election held on 21 September 2013 for the district:

Party	Votes per polling division													Postal votes	Total votes	%	Seats
Party	Galagedara	Gampola	Harispattuwa	Hewaheta	Kandy	Kundasale	Nawalapitiya	Pathadumbara	Senkadagala	Teldeniya	Ududumbara	Udunuwara	Yatinuwara	Postal votes	Total votes	%	Seats
United People's Freedom Alliance (Note: Including the SLFP .)	19,072	34,310	52,924	24,103	9,156	31,606	34,824	24,514	23,270	15,945	22,225	23,613	25,667	14,583	355,812	55.76%	16
United National Party	8,931	21,578	32,401	11,559	10,047	13,136	13,358	16,432	16,762	7,938	10,782	19,071	13,973	4,219	200,187	31.37%	9
Democratic Party	1,548	1,545	5,216	1,408	1,741	6,369	2,606	2,788	3,388	1,632	321	2,422	4,173	2,274	37,431	5.87%	2
Ceylon Workers' Congress	97	3,221	242	2,296	498	1,832	3,490	3,905	838	1,764	41	302	94	167	18,787	2.94%	1
Sri Lanka Muslim Congress	632	535	2,386	1,303	293	511	287	1,391	215	181	28	2,448	842	85	11,137	1.75%	1
Janatha Vimukthi Peramuna	463	389	1,308	144	221	1,104	701	512	635	425	505	347	484	402	7,640	1.20%	0
Sri Lanka People's Party	63	59	165	47	107	103	44	95	275	41	50	168	311	22	1,550	0.24%	0
Up-Country People's Front	12	341	65	162	234	53	360	70	63	48	4	18	10	18	1,458	0.23%	0
Jana Setha Peramuna	10	13	85	7	16	31	24	13	20	3	5	68	438	23	756	0.12%	0
United Lanka Great Council	22	47	82	33	15	75	54	39	30	30	24	43	40	10	544	0.09%	0
New Democratic Front	28	33	59	12	22	67	46	43	47	11	4	27	28	77	504	0.08%	0
Our National Front	17	55	54	30	8	38	54	38	24	28	33	43	27	17	466	0.07%	0
Patriotic National Front	19	16	43	12	20	59	23	26	23	16	1	26	38	20	342	0,05%	0
Independent Group 8	17	20	32	27	7	14	41	14	8	21	10	19	15	6	257	0.04%	0
Independent Group 4	3	23	20	20	8	23	39	40	13	11	4	6	12	6	228	0.04%	0
Ruhunu People's Party	0	41	10	8	2	6	20	13	21	2	1	28	12	3	167	0.03%	0
New Sinhala Heritage	7	10	21	6	6	15	18	14	16	2	4	9	16	10	154	0.02%	0
Independent Group 7	6	9	8	13	3	14	19	11	5	8	2	7	7	0	112	0,02%	0
Independent Group 6	3	12	6	2	6	8	25	9	6	5	9	4	14	1	110	0.02%	0
Independent Group 1	6	7	20	3	6	5	9	6	10	4	6	7	10	7	106	0.02%	0
Muslim Liberation Front	5	11	17	4	4	9	11	7	4	6	2	3	4	2	89	0.01%	0
Sri Lanka Labour Party	2	8	6	3	1	6	14	18	6	8	1	1	3	0	77	0.01%	0
Independent Group 2	4	6	8	5	0	7	7	8	2	3	3	3	8	2	66	0.01%	0
Independent Group 5	4	4	13	3	2	2	10	3	3	4	4	6	6	1	65	0.01%	0
Independent Group 3	3	5	10	3	3	8	4	4	1	3	4	7	2	2	58	0.01%	0
Valid votes	30,974	62,298	95,201	41,213	22,426	55,101	56,088	50,013	45,685	28,139	34,073	48,695	46,234	21,957	638,097	100.00%	29
Rejected votes	1,471	4,331	4,993	3,003	941	2,961	4,990	3,610	2,111	2,116	2,264	2,835	2,385	1,137	39,148		
Total polled	32,445	66,629	100,194	44,216	23,367	58,062	61,078	53,623	47,796	30,255	36,337	51,530	48,619	23,094	677,245		
Registered electors	53,484	97,640	152,688	67,710	38,364	90,563	91,894	82,896	77,805	46,254	57,334	79,945	78,738	23,805	1,015,315		
Turnout	60.66%	68.24%	65.62%	65.30%	60.91%	64.11%	66.47%	64.69%	61.43%	65.41	63,38%	64.46%	61.75%	97.01%	66.7%		

The following candidates were elected:

Preferential votes
Party	Candidate	Votes
UPFA	Anuradha Jayaratne	107,644
UPFA	Sarath Ekanayake	70,121
UNP	Azath Salley	55,395
UNP	Jamaldeen Jeilabdeen	45,792
UPFA	Thilina Bandara Tennakoon	45,027
UPFA	Ediriweera Weerawardena	44,206
UPFA	Mahinda Abeykoon	29,889
UPFA	R. G. Samaranayake	28,646
UNP	Mayantha Dissanayake	27,204
UPFA	Nishshanka Herath	25,877
UPFA	Gunathilaka Rajapaksha	24,560
UNP	Lucky Jayawardena	24,437
UPFA	A. G. Sirisena	24,429
UPFA	Linton Wijesinghe	24,266
UPFA	Sunil Kithsiri Amaratunga	23,946
UPFA	Aluthgamage Weerasinghe	23,652
UPFA	Manel Bandara	23,400
UPFA	M. G. Jayaratne	22,816
UPFA	Jagath Wijenayake	22,386
UPFA	Gamini Wijaya Bandara	21,639
UNP	Padmalal de Alwis	19,037
UNP	Chanaka Ailapperuma	18,603
UNP	M. Velu Kumar	18,159
UNP	P. B. Warawewa	16,990
UNP	Chithra Srimathi Manthilake	16,054
CWC	Thureysami Madiyugaraja	8,774
DP	Channa Galappaththige	7,628
DP	Asanga Thilakaratne	5,542
SLMC	A. L. M. Uvais	3,275
