= Mayantha Dissanayake =

Sri Lankan politician

Hon. Mayantha Dissanayake
- මයන්ත දිසානායක மயந்த திஸாநாயக்க
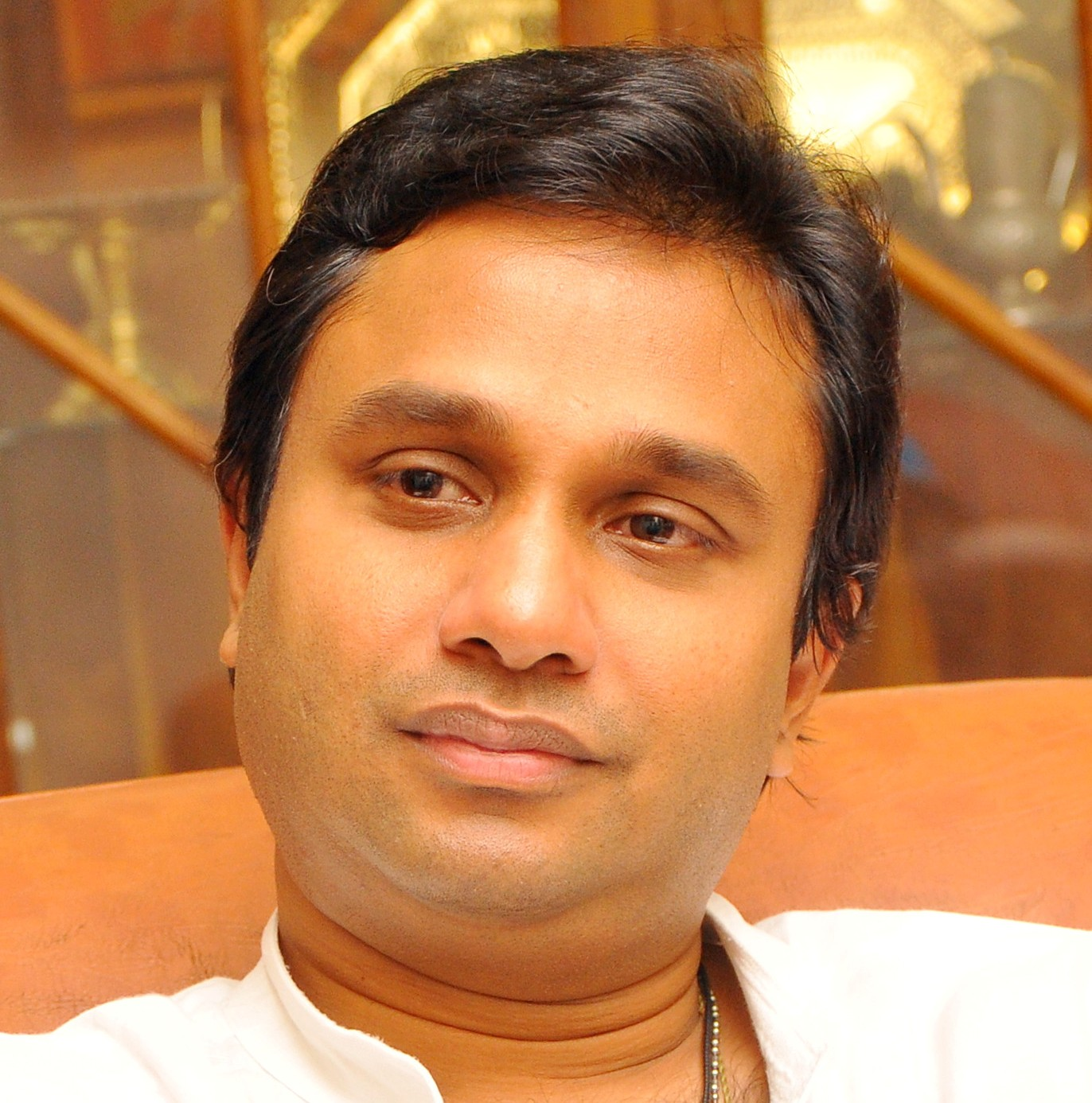
- Mayantha Yaswanth Dissanayake

Member of Parliament for National List
- In office 20 August 2020 – 24 September 2024

Member of Parliament for Kandy District
- In office 1 September 2015 – 3 March 2020
- Majority: 111,190

Personal details
- Born: 11 January 1974 (age 52)
- Party: Samagi Jana Balawegaya (since 2020); United National Party (2010–2020) Sri Lanka Freedom Party (until 2010)
- Relations: Navin (brother); Varuni (sister)
- Parent(s): Gamini Dissanayake; Srima Dissanayake
- Education: Royal College, Colombo

Mayantha Yaswanth Dissanayake (Sinhala: මයන්ත දිසානායක; Tamil: மயந்த திஸாநாயக்க; born 11 January 1974) is a Sri Lankan politician. He is a former Member of Parliament from the Kandy District and a former Provincial Councillor of the Central Provincial Council.

He is the youngest son of Gamini Dissanayake, former leader of the opposition and a prominent minister of the United National Party from 1977 to 1994. He is also a grandson of Andrew Dissanayake. His brother, Navin Dissanayake is also a former UNP MP from the Nuwara Eliya District. Mayantha Dissanayake was educated at Royal College, Colombo.

Dissanayake was the SLFP organizer for the Ampara District under former president Mahinda Rajapaksa. He supported general Sarath Fonseka at the 2010 presidential election and crossed over from the SLFP to the UNP. He was appointed as chief organizer to the Ududumbara electorate, Nawalapitiya electorate and at last the Yatinuwara electorate. A few years later, he polled the second highest number of preferential votes in the Kandy district and was elected as a Councillor of the Central Provincial Council. Dissanayake then served as the chief organizer for the Yatinuwara electorate for the UNP.

== See also ==
- List of political families in Sri Lanka
