= Udawatte =

Udawatte is both a surname and a given name. Notable people with the name include:

- Mahela Udawatte (born 1986), Sri Lankan cricketer
- Praba Udawatte (born 1980), Sri Lankan cricketer
- Udawatte Nanda Thero, Sri Lankan politician
