= Abayakoon =

Abayakoon (Sinhala: අබයකූන්, romanized: Abayakūn) is a Sinhalese surname. Notable people with the surname include:

- Dimuthu Bandara Abayakoon (born 1971), Sri Lankan politician
- S. B. S. Abayakoon (born 1958), Sri Lankan academic
