= Udayana (disambiguation) =

Udayana may refer to:

- Udayana, Indian philosopher
- Udayana (king), legendary Indian king
- Udayanan Vasavadatta, 1947 Indian film
- Udayana Kirindigoda, Sri Lankan politician
- Udayana Warmadewa, king of Bali
- Oddiyana or Udayana, a kingdom of early medieval India
