= Aluthgamage =

Aluthgamage (Sinhala: අලුත්ගමගේ, romanized: Alutgamagē) is a Sinhalese surname. Notable people with the surname include:

- Ananda Aluthgamage, Sri Lankan businessman and politician
- Mahindananda Aluthgamage (born 1964), Sri Lankan politician

== See also ==
- List of political families in Sri Lanka (section Aluthgamage)
