= Gunathilaka Rajapaksha =

Sri Lankan politician

Hon. Gunathilaka Rajapaksha
- ගුණතිලක රාජපක්ෂ குணதிலக ராஜபக்ஷ

Member of the Parliament of Sri Lanka
- Incumbent
- Assumed office 2020
- Constituency: Kandy District

Member of the Central Provincial Council
- In office 2009–2018
- Constituency: Kandy District

Personal details
- Born: Rajapaksha Gedara Gunathilaka Rajapaksha; 8 November 1957 (age 68)
- Party: Sri Lanka Podujana Peramuna
- Other political affiliations: Sri Lanka People's Freedom Alliance

Rajapaksha Gedara Gunathilaka Rajapaksha (born 8 November 1957) is a Sri Lankan politician, former provincial councillor and Member of Parliament.

Rajapaksha was born on 8 November 1957. He was a member of Poojapitiya Divisional Council and the Central Provincial Council. He contested the 2020 parliamentary election as a Sri Lanka People's Freedom Alliance electoral alliance candidate in Kandy District and was elected to the Parliament of Sri Lanka.

Electoral history of Gunathilaka Rajapaksha
Election	Constituency	Party	Alliance	Votes	Result
2009 provincial	Kandy District		United People's Freedom Alliance	25,957	Elected
2013 provincial	Kandy District		United People's Freedom Alliance	24,560	Elected
2020 parliamentary	Kandy District	Sri Lanka Podujana Peramuna	Sri Lanka People's Freedom Alliance	49,317	Elected
