= Ediriweera Weerawardhana =

Sri Lankan politician

Hon. Ediriweera Weerawardhana MP
- එදිරිවීර වීරවර්ධන

Member of Parliament for Kandy District
- In office 1994–2005

Deputy Minister of Development, Rehabilitation and Reconstruction of the East and Rural Housing Development
- In office 2000–2005

Personal details
- Born: 30 April 1951 (age 74) Kandy, Sri Lanka
- Party: Sri Lanka Freedom Party
- Children: Eric Prasanna Weerawardhana
- Profession: Politician

Ediriweera Weerawardhana (Sinhala: එදිරිවීර වීරවර්ධන), is a Sri Lankan politician and former Member of Parliament. He served as a Deputy Minister in the Central Government for some time, later withdrew from national politics and entered provincial council politics.

== Political career ==
In 2000, he was appointed as the Deputy Minister of Development, Rehabilitation and Reconstruction of the East and Rural Housing Development under Kumaratunga cabinet. In 2014, he assumed the duties as the Central Provincial Minister of Road Development, Transport, Power, Energy, Housing and Construction. In June 2016, Weerawardhana was appointed as the acting Chief Minister in Central Province. In 2019, he was appointed as the New seat organizer for Harispattuwa seat in Kandy district. In 2021 under the presidency of Maithripala Sirisena, he was appointed as one of the 10 Vice Presidents of The Sri Lanka Freedom Party's (SLFP) Executive Committee.

Electoral history of Ediriweera Weerawardhana
Election	Constituency	Party	Alliance	Votes	Result
1994 parliamentary	Kandy District	Sri Lanka Freedom Party	People's Alliance	53,192	Elected
2000 parliamentary	Kandy District	Sri Lanka Freedom Party	People's Alliance	35,388	Elected
2004 provincial	Kandy District	Sri Lanka Freedom Party	United People's Freedom Alliance	27,047	Elected
2009 provincial	Kandy District	Sri Lanka Freedom Party	United People's Freedom Alliance	46,903	Elected
2013 provincial	Kandy District	Sri Lanka Freedom Party	United People's Freedom Alliance	44,206	Elected
