= Y. M. Nawaratna Banda =

Sri Lankan politician

Hon. Nawaratna Banda

Member of Parliament for Kandy District
- In office 2004–2010

Personal details
- Party: Janatha Vimukthi Peramuna

Yapa Mudiyanselage Nawaratna Banda is a Sri Lankan politician and a former member of the Parliament of Sri Lanka.
