= M. H. A. Haleem =

Sri Lankan politician

Hon. M. H. A. Haleem MP
- முகமது ஹாசிம் அப்துல் ஹலீம் මොහොමඩ් හෂීම් අබ්දුල් හලීම්

Member of Parliament for Kandy District
- Incumbent
- Assumed office 2000

Minister of Muslim Religious Affairs and Posts
- In office 21 January 2015 – 21 November 2019
- President: Maithripala Sirisena
- Prime Minister: Ranil Wickremesinghe

Personal details
- Born: August 29, 1956 (age 69) Sri Lanka
- Party: Samagi Jana Balawegaya (since 2020)
- Other political affiliations: United National Party (until 2020)
- Occupation: Bank Officer

Mohamed Hashim Abdul Haleem (born August 29, 1956) is a Sri Lankan politician and a member of the Parliament of Sri Lanka. He was the inaugural and so far only Minister of Muslim Religious Affairs and Posts in Sri Lanka.
