= A. R. M. Abdul Cader =

Sri Lankan politician (1936–2015)

Hon. Abdul Cader

Minister of Co-operatives
- In office 2001–2004

Member of Parliament for Kandy District
- Incumbent
- Assumed office 2004
- In office 1989–2001

Member of Parliament for National List
- In office 2001–2004

Personal details
- Born: 30 October 1936
- Died: 3 October 2015 (aged 78) Kandy, Sri Lanka
- Party: United People's Freedom Alliance

Abdul Rahim Mohideen Abdul Cader (30 October 1936 – 3 October 2015) was a Sri Lankan politician and businessman. He was a representative from the Kandy District (Mahanuwara) for the United National Party in the Parliament of Sri Lanka. He was Minister of Cooperatives in the UNP government formed in 2001. In August 2004, he was arrested on corruption accusations. In November 2004, he was granted bail.
