= Harispattuwa Polling Division =

Harispattuwa
- Polling Division
- Coordinates: 7.371188°N 80.584934°E
- Country: Sri Lanka
- Province: Central Province, Sri Lanka
- Electoral District: Kandy Electoral District

Area
  - Total: 137.63 km^{2} (53.14 sq mi)

Population (2012)
  - Total: 209,488
  - Density: 1,522/km^{2} (3,940/sq mi)
- ISO 3166 code: EC-04B

The Harispattuwa Polling Division is a Polling Division in the Kandy Electoral District, in the Central Province, Sri Lanka.

== Presidential Election Results ==
=== Summary ===
The winner of Harispattuwa has matched the final country result 6 out of 8 times. Hence, Harispattuwa is a Weak Bellwether for Presidential Elections.

Year	Harispattuwa	Kandy Electoral District	MAE %	Sri Lanka	MAE %
2019	SLPP	SLPP	1.94%	SLPP	4.00%
2015	NDF	NDF	3.02%	NDF	6.29%
2010	UPFA	UPFA	2.74%	UPFA	6.38%
2005	UNP	UNP	2.76%	UPFA	8.63%
1999	UNP	PA	2.86%	PA	4.29%
1994	PA	PA	1.66%	PA	3.92%
1988	UNP	UNP	1.11%	UNP	1.91%
1982	UNP	UNP	2.44%	UNP	6.93%
Matches/Mean MAE	6/8	7/8	2.32%	8/8	5.29%

=== 2019 Sri Lankan Presidential Election ===
Party	Harispattuwa		Kandy Electoral District		Sri Lanka	
Party	Votes	%	Votes	%	Votes	%
SLPP	64,298	48.53%	471,502	50.43%	6,924,255	52.25%
NDF	62,044	46.83%	417,355	44.64%	5,564,239	41.99%
NMPP	3,401	2.57%	23,539	2.52%	418,553	3.16%
Other Parties (with < 1%)	2,754	2.08%	22,479	2.40%	345,452	2.61%
Valid Votes	132,497	99.15%	934,875	99.04%	13,252,499	98.99%
Rejected Votes	1,135	0.85%	9,020	0.96%	135,452	1.01%
Total Polled	133,632	84.10%	943,895	84.89%	13,387,951	83.71%
Registered Electors	158,903		1,111,860		15,992,568	

=== 2015 Sri Lankan Presidential Election ===
Party	Harispattuwa		Kandy Electoral District		Sri Lanka	
Party	Votes	%	Votes	%	Votes	%
NDF	71,533	57.69%	466,994	54.56%	6,217,162	51.28%
UPFA	51,156	41.26%	378,585	44.23%	5,768,090	47.58%
Other Parties (with < 1%)	1,309	1.06%	10,329	1.21%	138,200	1.14%
Valid Votes	123,998	98.92%	855,908	98.73%	12,123,452	98.85%
Rejected Votes	1,356	1.08%	10,993	1.27%	140,925	1.15%
Total Polled	125,354	79.61%	866,901	79.71%	12,264,377	78.69%
Registered Electors	157,463		1,087,542		15,585,942	

=== 2010 Sri Lankan Presidential Election ===
Party	Harispattuwa		Kandy Electoral District		Sri Lanka	
Party	Votes	%	Votes	%	Votes	%
UPFA	56,508	51.50%	406,636	54.16%	6,015,934	57.88%
NDF	51,406	46.85%	329,492	43.89%	4,173,185	40.15%
Other Parties (with < 1%)	1,800	1.64%	14,658	1.95%	204,494	1.97%
Valid Votes	109,714	98.95%	750,786	98.85%	10,393,613	99.03%
Rejected Votes	1,161	1.05%	8,700	1.15%	101,838	0.97%
Total Polled	110,875	75.18%	759,486	75.87%	10,495,451	66.70%
Registered Electors	147,475		1,001,074		15,734,587	

=== 2005 Sri Lankan Presidential Election ===
Party	Harispattuwa		Kandy Electoral District		Sri Lanka	
Party	Votes	%	Votes	%	Votes	%
UNP	59,899	57.17%	387,150	54.33%	4,706,366	48.43%
UPFA	43,540	41.55%	315,672	44.30%	4,887,152	50.29%
Other Parties (with < 1%)	1,338	1.28%	9,798	1.37%	123,521	1.27%
Valid Votes	104,777	98.65%	712,620	98.64%	9,717,039	98.88%
Rejected Votes	1,432	1.35%	9,817	1.36%	109,869	1.12%
Total Polled	106,209	76.87%	722,437	77.37%	9,826,908	69.51%
Registered Electors	138,171		933,754		14,136,979	

=== 1999 Sri Lankan Presidential Election ===
Party	Harispattuwa		Kandy Electoral District		Sri Lanka	
Party	Votes	%	Votes	%	Votes	%
UNP	41,640	47.75%	276,360	45.10%	3,602,748	42.71%
PA	40,996	47.01%	308,187	50.29%	4,312,157	51.12%
JVP	2,782	3.19%	15,512	2.53%	343,927	4.08%
Other Parties (with < 1%)	1,780	2.04%	12,752	2.08%	176,679	2.09%
Valid Votes	87,198	96.98%	612,811	97.29%	8,435,754	97.69%
Rejected Votes	2,720	3.02%	17,060	2.71%	199,536	2.31%
Total Polled	89,918	74.84%	629,871	77.61%	8,635,290	72.17%
Registered Electors	120,150		811,606		11,965,536	

=== 1994 Sri Lankan Presidential Election ===
Party	Harispattuwa		Kandy Electoral District		Sri Lanka	
Party	Votes	%	Votes	%	Votes	%
PA	48,134	58.36%	320,110	56.64%	4,709,205	62.28%
UNP	33,007	40.02%	235,519	41.68%	2,715,283	35.91%
Other Parties (with < 1%)	1,332	1.62%	9,488	1.68%	137,040	1.81%
Valid Votes	82,473	97.85%	565,117	97.55%	7,561,526	98.03%
Rejected Votes	1,809	2.15%	14,179	2.45%	151,706	1.97%
Total Polled	84,282	77.15%	579,296	77.85%	7,713,232	69.12%
Registered Electors	109,246		744,151		11,158,880	

=== 1988 Sri Lankan Presidential Election ===
Party	Harispattuwa		Kandy Electoral District		Sri Lanka	
Party	Votes	%	Votes	%	Votes	%
UNP	30,708	53.85%	234,124	54.88%	2,569,199	50.43%
SLFP	25,594	44.89%	186,187	43.65%	2,289,857	44.95%
SLMP	719	1.26%	6,266	1.47%	235,701	4.63%
Valid Votes	57,021	98.34%	426,577	98.57%	5,094,754	98.24%
Rejected Votes	962	1.66%	6,167	1.43%	91,499	1.76%
Total Polled	57,983	61.61%	432,744	68.36%	5,186,256	55.87%
Registered Electors	94,109		633,030		9,283,143	

=== 1982 Sri Lankan Presidential Election ===
Party	Harispattuwa		Kandy Electoral District		Sri Lanka	
Party	Votes	%	Votes	%	Votes	%
UNP	43,186	61.50%	289,621	59.80%	3,450,815	52.93%
SLFP	23,301	33.18%	178,647	36.89%	2,546,348	39.05%
JVP	3,374	4.80%	12,493	2.58%	273,428	4.19%
Other Parties (with < 1%)	363	0.52%	3,536	0.73%	249,460	3.83%
Valid Votes	70,224	99.15%	484,297	99.07%	6,520,156	98.78%
Rejected Votes	605	0.85%	4,548	0.93%	80,470	1.22%
Total Polled	70,829	85.76%	488,845	89.44%	6,600,626	80.15%
Registered Electors	82,590		546,565		8,235,358	

== Parliamentary Election Results ==
=== Summary ===
The winner of Harispattuwa has matched the final country result 4 out of 7 times. Hence, Harispattuwa is a Weak Bellwether for Parliamentary Elections.

Year	Harispattuwa	Kandy Electoral District	MAE %	Sri Lanka	MAE %
2015	UNP	UNP	1.01%	UNP	6.96%
2010	UPFA	UPFA	3.09%	UPFA	4.21%
2004	UNP	UNP	1.06%	UPFA	7.07%
2001	UNP	UNP	6.23%	UNP	8.11%
2000	UNP	PA	4.24%	PA	3.51%
1994	UNP	UNP	2.15%	PA	2.87%
1989	UNP	UNP	0.70%	UNP	6.10%
Matches/Mean MAE	4/7	5/7	2.64%	7/7	5.55%

=== 2015 Sri Lankan Parliamentary Election ===
Party	Harispattuwa		Kandy Electoral District		Sri Lanka	
Party	Votes	%	Votes	%	Votes	%
UNP	63,853	56.73%	440,761	55.61%	5,098,916	45.77%
UPFA	42,799	38.02%	309,152	39.00%	4,732,664	42.48%
JVP	4,459	3.96%	30,669	3.87%	544,154	4.88%
Other Parties (with < 1%)	1,453	1.29%	12,055	1.52%	100,088	0.90%
Valid Votes	112,564	95.60%	792,637	95.48%	11,140,333	95.35%
Rejected Votes	5,126	4.35%	37,065	4.46%	516,926	4.42%
Total Polled	117,748	74.78%	830,165	79.13%	11,684,111	77.66%
Registered Electors	157,463		1,049,160		15,044,490	

=== 2010 Sri Lankan Parliamentary Election ===
Party	Harispattuwa		Kandy Electoral District		Sri Lanka	
Party	Votes	%	Votes	%	Votes	%
UPFA	46,026	57.53%	339,819	60.81%	4,846,388	60.38%
UNP	30,124	37.66%	192,798	34.50%	2,357,057	29.37%
DNA	3,551	4.44%	23,728	4.25%	441,251	5.50%
Other Parties (with < 1%)	296	0.37%	2,459	0.44%	30,354	0.38%
Valid Votes	79,997	90.49%	558,804	90.49%	8,026,322	96.03%
Rejected Votes	8,345	9.44%	58,333	9.45%	581,465	6.96%
Total Polled	88,401	59.94%	617,559	61.70%	8,358,246	59.29%
Registered Electors	147,475		1,000,861		14,097,690	

=== 2004 Sri Lankan Parliamentary Election ===
Party	Harispattuwa		Kandy Electoral District		Sri Lanka	
Party	Votes	%	Votes	%	Votes	%
UNP	46,572	50.58%	313,859	49.99%	3,486,792	37.73%
UPFA	37,806	41.06%	268,131	42.71%	4,223,126	45.70%
JHU	7,079	7.69%	42,192	6.72%	552,723	5.98%
Other Parties (with < 1%)	621	0.67%	3,684	0.59%	64,227	0.69%
Valid Votes	92,078	92.95%	627,866	93.24%	9,241,931	94.52%
Rejected Votes	6,988	7.05%	45,484	6.75%	534,452	5.47%
Total Polled	99,066	74.26%	673,380	76.47%	9,777,821	75.74%
Registered Electors	133,404		880,634		12,909,631	

=== 2001 Sri Lankan Parliamentary Election ===
Party	Harispattuwa		Kandy Electoral District		Sri Lanka	
Party	Votes	%	Votes	%	Votes	%
UNP	53,249	58.60%	314,297	52.77%	4,086,026	45.62%
PA	28,636	31.51%	233,637	39.23%	3,330,815	37.19%
JVP	7,496	8.25%	37,146	6.24%	815,353	9.10%
Other Parties (with < 1%)	1,488	1.64%	10,496	1.76%	129,347	1.44%
Valid Votes	90,869	93.03%	595,576	93.40%	8,955,844	94.77%
Rejected Votes	6,813	6.97%	42,103	6.60%	494,009	5.23%
Total Polled	97,682	77.03%	637,679	76.03%	9,449,878	76.03%
Registered Electors	126,815		838,687		12,428,762	

=== 2000 Sri Lankan Parliamentary Election ===
Party	Harispattuwa		Kandy Electoral District		Sri Lanka	
Party	Votes	%	Votes	%	Votes	%
UNP	35,828	40.94%	243,623	40.27%	3,451,765	40.12%
PA	34,177	39.05%	282,282	46.66%	3,899,329	45.33%
NUA	10,990	12.56%	32,023	5.29%	185,593	2.16%
JVP	3,732	4.26%	21,565	3.56%	518,725	6.03%
SU	1,592	1.82%	10,999	1.82%	127,859	1.49%
Other Parties (with < 1%)	1,193	1.36%	14,436	2.39%	161,809	1.88%
Valid Votes	87,512	N/A	604,928	N/A	8,602,617	N/A

=== 1994 Sri Lankan Parliamentary Election ===
Party	Harispattuwa		Kandy Electoral District		Sri Lanka	
Party	Votes	%	Votes	%	Votes	%
UNP	42,356	50.16%	301,824	52.35%	3,498,370	44.04%
PA	41,035	48.59%	267,683	46.43%	3,887,805	48.94%
Other Parties (with < 1%)	1,052	1.25%	7,045	1.22%	175,576	2.21%
Valid Votes	84,443	95.10%	576,552	94.89%	7,943,688	95.20%
Rejected Votes	4,352	4.90%	31,019	5.11%	400,395	4.80%
Total Polled	88,795	81.28%	607,571	81.67%	8,344,095	74.75%
Registered Electors	109,246		743,939		11,163,064	

=== 1989 Sri Lankan Parliamentary Election ===
Party	Harispattuwa		Kandy Electoral District		Sri Lanka	
Party	Votes	%	Votes	%	Votes	%
UNP	21,218	61.51%	204,973	61.72%	2,838,005	50.71%
SLFP	10,538	30.55%	105,977	31.91%	1,785,369	31.90%
SLMC	2,476	7.18%	14,697	4.43%	202,016	3.61%
Other Parties (with < 1%)	265	0.77%	6,462	1.95%	209,706	3.75%
Valid Votes	34,497	93.19%	332,109	93.69%	5,596,468	93.87%
Rejected Votes	2,519	6.81%	22,374	6.31%	365,563	6.13%
Total Polled	37,016	40.10%	354,483	56.42%	5,962,031	63.60%
Registered Electors	92,300		628,317		9,374,164	

== Demographics ==
=== Ethnicity ===
The Harispattuwa Polling Division has a Sinhalese majority (67.7%) and a significant Moor population (28.2%) . In comparison, the Kandy Electoral District (which contains the Harispattuwa Polling Division) has a Sinhalese majority (74.4%) and a significant Moor population (13.9%)

Ethnicity in Harispattuwa
1. Sinhalese (67.7%)
2. Moor (28.2%)
3. Indian Tamil (2.10%)
4. Sri Lankan Tamil (1.70%)
5. Other (0.20%)

=== Religion ===
The Harispattuwa Polling Division has a Buddhist majority (67.1%) and a significant Muslim population (28.8%) . In comparison, the Kandy Electoral District (which contains the Harispattuwa Polling Division) has a Buddhist majority (73.4%) and a significant Muslim population (14.3%)

Religion in Harispattuwa
1. Buddhist (67.1%)
2. Muslim (28.8%)
3. Hindu (3.00%)
4. Other (1.10%)
