= M. Velu Kumar =

Sri Lankan politician

Hon. M. Velu Kumar MP
- வேலு குமார் වේලු කුමාර්

Member of the Parliament of Sri Lanka
- Incumbent
- Assumed office August 2020
- Constituency: Kandy District
- In office August 2015 – March 2020
- Constituency: Kandy District

Member of the Central Provincial Council
- In office 2013–2015
- Constituency: Kandy District

Personal details
- Born: 16 January 1973 (age 53)
- Party: Democratic People's Front
- Other political affiliations: Samagi Jana Balawegaya
- Education: University of Colombo

M. Velu Kumar (born 16 January 1973) is a Sri Lankan politician, former provincial minister and Member of Parliament.

== Early life ==
Velu Kumar was born on 16 January 1973. He was educated at Thalathuoya Tamil Maha Vidyalayam, Asoka Vidyalayam, Kandy and St. Sylvester's College, Kandy. He graduated with a B.B.A. degree from the University of Colombo.

== Career ==
Velu Kumar is a member of the Democratic People's Front. He was elected as one of the vice-presidents of the Tamil Progressive Alliance in June 2015.

Velu Kumar contested the 2013 provincial council election as one of the United National Front electoral alliance's candidates in Kandy District and was elected to the Central Provincial Council. He contested the 2015 parliamentary election as one of the United National Front for Good Governance electoral alliance's candidates in Kandy District and was elected to the Parliament of Sri Lanka. He was re-elected at the 2020 parliamentary election.

== Electoral history ==
Electoral history of M. Velu Kumar
Election	Constituency	Party	Alliance	Votes	Result
2013 provincial	Kandy District	Democratic People's Front	United National Front	18,159	Elected
2015 parliamentary	Kandy District	Democratic People's Front	United National Front for Good Governance	62,556	Elected
2020 parliamentary	Kandy District	Democratic People's Front	Samagi Jana Balawegaya	57,445	Elected
