= Neurosurgery in Sri Lanka =

Neurosurgery in Sri Lanka

== Origin ==
Shelton Cabraal, FRCS is known as the father of neurosurgery in Sri Lanka. In 1956 he formed the first organised neurosurgery unit in the country. The unit was located in the General Hospital Colombo (present National Hospital of Sri Lanka). It is said that this unit was an up-to-date unit at the time. It even had the facility to perform skull base surgery, which was a novelty at that time. Most of the "first neurosurgery operation in the country" were performed here.

== Associations ==
Fifty years later in 2006, Neurosurgeons Association of Sri Lanka was formed under the leadership of Jaliya Lokuketagoda. Other leading neurosurgeons who contributed to this task were Deepal Attanayake, Fred Perera, S.C.Abeysuriya, Prasanna Gunasena, Ranjith Wickramasinghe, Saman Wadanamby, Jayantha Liyanage, Himashi Kularatne, Arul Kanagarajan, T. Rajakaruna, Nishantha Gunasekara and Sunil Perera . S C Abeysooriya was elected the first president.

== Technological contributions ==
First ever operative neurosurgery contribution from Sri Lanka to the world surfaced in 2012. It was a combination of open craniotomy and stereotaxy which is used to treat intraventricular hemorrhage and the technique was designed by Jaliya Lokuketagoda.

== Neurosurgeon training and certification ==
Sri Lanka has just over 20 consultant neurosurgeons for over 20 million people. The country produces its own neurosurgeons through a seven-year rigorous training process. The training includes a mandatory training segment that has to be completed in Sri Lanka and another mandatory training segment which has to be completed in a reputed neurosurgery center in England or in Australia. This way Sri Lanka manages to offer a high level of care to its neurosurgery patients. The Postgraduate Institute of Medicine (PGIM) of University of Colombo is the responsible body for training and certifying neurosurgeons. The Sri Lanka Medical Council (SLMC) maintains a list of Consultant Specialists of the country including neurosurgeons. If a non-Sri Lankan neurosurgeon wishes to practice in the country a temporary medical licence should be obtained from the SLMC.

== Patient care ==
The Sri Lankan population is served by two systems. In the private healthcare system, the patient has to pay, and in the public healthcare system, healthcare is free. Both systems offer reasonably good neurosurgery service to the population. However, most modern neurosurgery facilities are only available in major cities like Colombo. The government neurosurgical centers are situated in Colombo, Sri Jayawardenepura, Kandy, Karapititya (Galle), Jaffna, Batticalo and Badulla. The Colombo center, which is affiliated to the National Hospital of Sri Lanka is the best equipped and well staffed unit. All the private neurosurgical units are located in Colombo. They are affiliated to the private hospitals; Nawaloka hospital, Asiri Group (Central hospital) and Lanka hospital. Central hospital has the leading neurosurgery division in the private sector. All these units have well equipped intensive care units for post-operative care. Although medical tourism is not a major industry in Sri Lanka, there are quite a number of foreigners who have sought neurosurgery care in these private hospitals during emergency situations. The private neurosurgery units accept most international and local health insurances.
