= Wasantha Yapa Bandara =

Sri Lankan politician

Hon. Wasantha Yapa Bandara MP
- වසන්ත යාපා බණ්ඩාර வசந்த யாப்பா பண்டார

Member of Parliament for Kandy District
- Incumbent
- Assumed office 2020

Personal details
- Party: Sri Lanka Podujana Peramuna
- Other political affiliations: Sri Lanka People's Freedom Alliance

Wasantha Yapa Bandara is a Sri Lankan politician and a member of the Sri Lankan parliament from Kandy Electoral District as a member of the Sri Lanka Podujana Peramuna.

Electoral history of Wasantha Yapa Bandara
Election	Constituency	Party	Alliance	Votes	Result
2020 parliamentary	Kandy District	Sri Lanka Podujana Peramuna	Sri Lanka People's Freedom Alliance	108,940	Elected
