= Ministry of Muslim Religious Affairs =

Agency overview
- Formed: 21 January 2015
- Jurisdiction: Government of Sri Lanka
- Minister responsible: Vacant
- Child agency: Ministry of Postal Service

The Ministry of Muslim Religious Affairs is a ministry in the Government of Sri Lanka that represents and protects the interests of the Sri Lankan Muslims and the minority religion of Islam. The ministry was created on 21 January 2015 under the Sirisena government.

Only one individual has ever served as the responsible minister for the ministry, M. H. A. Haleem, and the ministry has had no responsible minister since November 2019.

== Ministers ==
Minister of Muslim Religious Affairs of Sri Lanka
- Incumbent; Vacant since 21 November 2019
- Ministry of Muslim Religious Affairs
- Appointer: The president with the advice of the prime minister
- Term length: 5 years
- Inaugural holder: M. H. A. Haleem
- Formation: 21 January 2015
- Final holder: M. H. A. Haleem

The minister of Muslim religious affairs is an appointment in the Cabinet of Sri Lanka and representing the minority religion Islam.

Parties

United National Party Sri Lanka Freedom Party

Name	Portrait	Party	Took office	Left office	Head(s) of government
M. H. A. Haleem		United National Party	21 January 2015	21 November 2019	Maithripala Sirisena
