= Lucky Jayawardena =

Sri Lankan politician (1955–2025)

Hon. Lucky Jayawardana MP
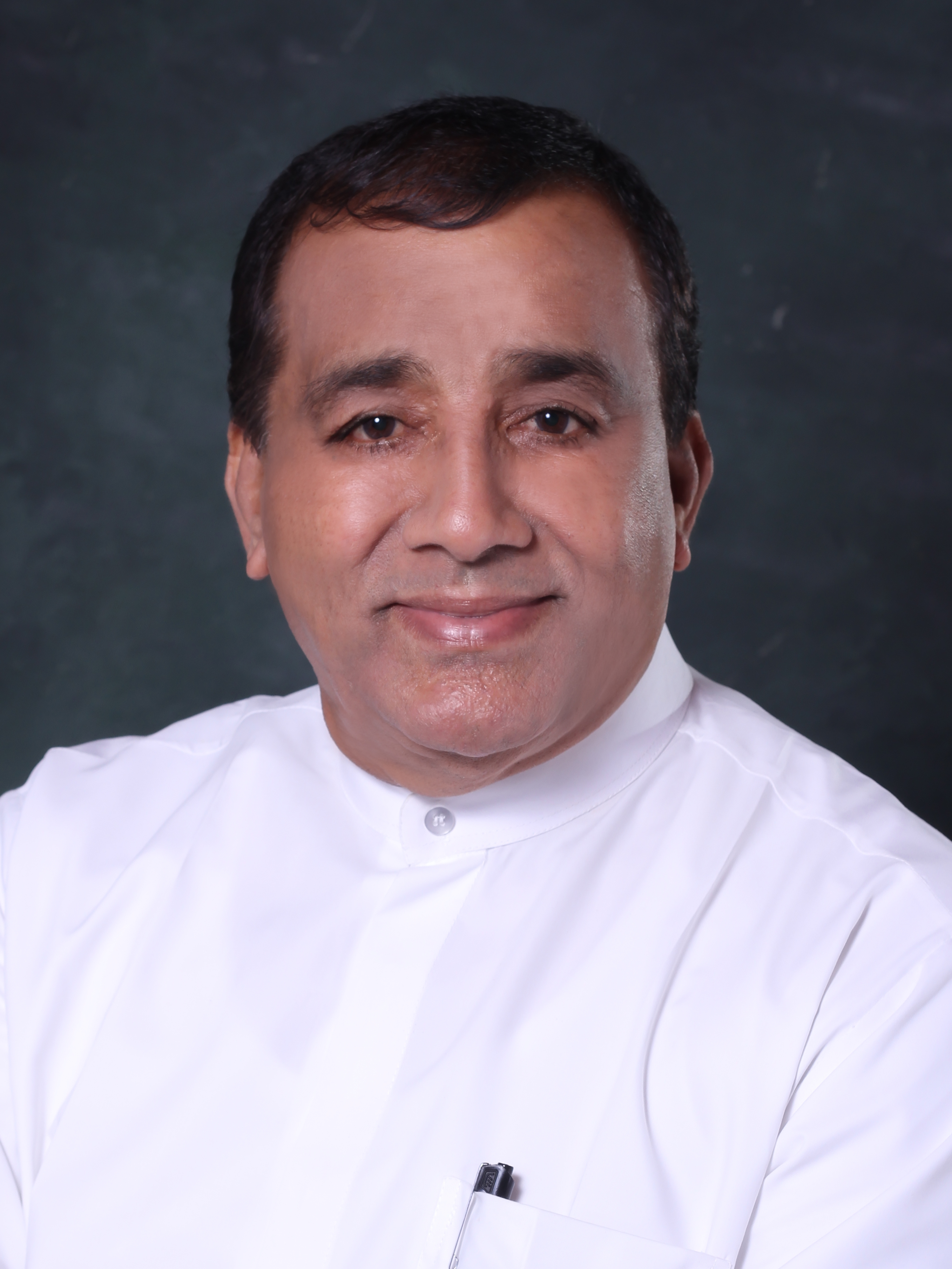
- Jayawardena in 2015

Member of Parliament for Kandy District
- In office 1 September 2015 – 3 March 2020
- President: Maithripala Sirisena
- Prime Minister: Ranil Wickremesinghe
- In office 25 August 1994 – 7 February 2004

Personal details
- Born: 1955 Kandy, Dominion of Ceylon
- Died: 8 January 2025 (aged 70) Kandy, Sri Lanka
- Party: United National Party
- Spouse: Achala née Wijethunge
- Children: Two
- Occupation: Politician

Lucky Dissanayake Jayawardena (1955 – 8 January 2025) was a Sri Lankan politician who served as a member of parliament of the United National Party from the Kandy District from 1994 to 2004 and from 2015 to 2020. He also served as the minister of city planning, water supply and higher education.

== Political career ==
Jayawardena started his political career from by running in the 1988 provincial council elections. Following the election, he was elected Chief Government Whip and later the vice chairman of the Central Provincial Council. He was re-elected to the council in 1993, and was appointed the Minister of Road Development, Power and Energy, Housing and Construction, Transport, Sports, Youth Affairs, Art and Culture, Corporative Development, Food Supply and Distribution and Rural Development. In the meantime, he was appointed as Chief Organizer of the United National Party in the Udunuwara electorate President D. B. Wijetunga.

Jayawardena was elected as a Member of Parliament for the Kandy District in 1994. Jayawardena's party, the UNP, became the main opposition in the election. Jayawardena was re-elected in 2000. Parliament was dissolved within a year and Jayawardena was able to resecure his parliamentary seat in 2001 and was subsequently appointed the minister of Land & Deeds. Meanwhile, he also acted as the Chairman of the Kandy District Development Committee. In 2004, he contested as the chief ministerial candidate of the UNP.

From 2004 to 2009, he served as the Chief Opposition Whip and as the General Secretary for Kandy District of the United National Party. In 2013, he was the chief ministerial candidate for the provincial council elections of that year and after the election, he was appointed as Opposition Leader of the Central Province. After the 2015 parliamentary election, he was reelected to the Sri Lankan parliament. Jayawardena was later appointed a state minister. He also chaired the sectoral oversight committee on Health and Social Qelfare. In addition, he was the chairman of the Kandy district development committee. He previously served as the state minister for hill country new township, infrastructure and community development, and in 2018, he was appointed the state minister of city planning and water supply.

== Personal life and death ==
Jayawardena was married to Achala Wijethunge and together they had two sons. On 8 January 2025, he died at the age of 70.
