= Mohomed Pasmin =

Sri Lankan politician

Hon. Mohomed Pasmin මොහමඩ් පස්මින් MP

Member of Parliament for Kandy District
- Incumbent
- Assumed office 21 November 2024
- Majority: 57,716 preferential votes

Member of Parliament for Kandy District

Personal details
- Party: Janatha Vimukthi Peramuna
- Other political affiliations: National People's Power
- Profession: Businessman

Mohomed Pasmin is a Sri Lankan politician and member of the National People's Power who was elected to the parliament in the 2024 Sri Lankan parliamentary election, representing Kandy Electoral District. He is a businessman by profession.
