= Udayana Kirindigoda =

Sri Lankan politician

Hon. Udayana Chaminda Kirindigoda MP
- උදයන කිරිඳිගොඩ உதயண கிரிந்திகொட

Member of Parliament for Kandy District
- Incumbent
- Assumed office 2020

Personal details
- Born: May 24th, 1970 ( Age 51 years) Kandy
- Citizenship: Sri Lankan
- Party: Sri Lanka Podujana Peramuna
- Other political affiliations: Sri Lanka People's Freedom Alliance
- Education: Dharmaraja College Kandy
- Occupation: Lawyer
- Profession: Attorney -at-law

Udayana Chaminda Kirindigoda is a Sri Lankan lawyer, politician and Member of Parliament. He is the son of late attorney Upali Kirindigoda. He has studied at Dharmaraja College Kandy and Sri Lanka Law College .

Kirindigoda is a member of Viyathmaga (Path of the Learned), a network of academics, businesspeople and professionals. He contested the 2020 parliamentary election as a Sri Lanka People's Freedom Alliance electoral alliance candidate in Kandy District and was elected to the Parliament of Sri Lanka.

Electoral history of Udayana Kirindigoda
Election	Constituency	Party	Alliance	Votes	Result
2020 parliamentary	Kandy District	Sri Lanka Podujana Peramuna	Sri Lanka People's Freedom Alliance	39,904	Elected
