= Udawatte Nanda Thera =

Sri Lankan politician

Hon. Udawatte Nanda

Member of Parliament for Kandy District
- In office 2004–2010

Personal details
- Party: Sri Lanka National Front 2010-
- Other political affiliations: United People's Freedom Alliance, Jathika Hela Urumaya 2004–2010

Udawatte Nanda Thera is a Sri Lankan politician and a former member of the Parliament of Sri Lanka.

In the 2010 general election he contested from the Sri Lanka National Front in Kandy District but was not elected. During the campaign he criticised his former party, the JHU and said that it was hijacked by laymen.
