= Ududumbara Polling Division =

Ududumbara
- Polling Division
- Coordinates: 7.342011°N 80.925399°E
- Country: Sri Lanka
- Province: Central Province, Sri Lanka
- Electoral District: Kandy Electoral District

Area
  - Total: 506.53 km^{2} (195.57 sq mi)

Population (2012)
  - Total: 74,388
  - Density: 147/km^{2} (380/sq mi)
- ISO 3166 code: EC-04D

The Ududumbara Polling Division is a Polling Division in the Kandy Electoral District, in the Central Province, Sri Lanka.

== Presidential Election Results ==
=== Summary ===
The winner of Ududumbara has matched the final country result 5 out of 8 times. Hence, Ududumbara is a Weak Bellwether for Presidential Elections.

Year	Ududumbara	Kandy Electoral District	MAE %	Sri Lanka	MAE %
2019	SLPP	SLPP	6.94%	SLPP	4.86%
2015	UPFA	NDF	14.86%	NDF	11.58%
2010	UPFA	UPFA	11.36%	UPFA	7.67%
2005	UNP	UNP	4.61%	UPFA	1.28%
1999	PA	PA	0.31%	PA	1.50%
1994	PA	PA	7.96%	PA	2.37%
1988	SLFP	UNP	6.39%	UNP	3.51%
1982	UNP	UNP	5.80%	UNP	2.51%
Matches/Mean MAE	5/8	7/8	7.28%	8/8	4.41%

=== 2019 Sri Lankan Presidential Election ===
Party	Ududumbara		Kandy Electoral District		Sri Lanka	
Party	Votes	%	Votes	%	Votes	%
SLPP	29,334	58.11%	471,502	50.43%	6,924,255	52.25%
NDF	19,098	37.83%	417,355	44.64%	5,564,239	41.99%
Other Parties (with < 1%)	1,298	2.57%	22,479	2.40%	345,452	2.61%
NMPP	748	1.48%	23,539	2.52%	418,553	3.16%
Valid Votes	50,478	99.32%	934,875	99.04%	13,252,499	98.99%
Rejected Votes	345	0.68%	9,020	0.96%	135,452	1.01%
Total Polled	50,823	87.98%	943,895	84.89%	13,387,951	83.71%
Registered Electors	57,764		1,111,860		15,992,568	

=== 2015 Sri Lankan Presidential Election ===
Party	Ududumbara		Kandy Electoral District		Sri Lanka	
Party	Votes	%	Votes	%	Votes	%
UPFA	27,722	59.09%	378,585	44.23%	5,768,090	47.58%
NDF	18,472	39.37%	466,994	54.56%	6,217,162	51.28%
Other Parties (with < 1%)	723	1.54%	10,329	1.21%	138,200	1.14%
Valid Votes	46,917	98.99%	855,908	98.73%	12,123,452	98.85%
Rejected Votes	479	1.01%	10,993	1.27%	140,925	1.15%
Total Polled	47,396	80.83%	866,901	79.71%	12,264,377	78.69%
Registered Electors	58,637		1,087,542		15,585,942	

=== 2010 Sri Lankan Presidential Election ===
Party	Ududumbara		Kandy Electoral District		Sri Lanka	
Party	Votes	%	Votes	%	Votes	%
UPFA	27,179	65.31%	406,636	54.16%	6,015,934	57.88%
NDF	13,220	31.77%	329,492	43.89%	4,173,185	40.15%
Other Parties (with < 1%)	1,214	2.92%	14,658	1.95%	204,494	1.97%
Valid Votes	41,613	99.05%	750,786	98.85%	10,393,613	99.03%
Rejected Votes	397	0.95%	8,700	1.15%	101,838	0.97%
Total Polled	42,010	75.52%	759,486	75.87%	10,495,451	66.70%
Registered Electors	55,629		1,001,074		15,734,587	

=== 2005 Sri Lankan Presidential Election ===
Party	Ududumbara		Kandy Electoral District		Sri Lanka	
Party	Votes	%	Votes	%	Votes	%
UNP	20,269	49.52%	387,150	54.33%	4,706,366	48.43%
UPFA	19,973	48.79%	315,672	44.30%	4,887,152	50.29%
Other Parties (with < 1%)	692	1.69%	9,798	1.37%	123,521	1.27%
Valid Votes	40,934	98.64%	712,620	98.64%	9,717,039	98.88%
Rejected Votes	564	1.36%	9,817	1.36%	109,869	1.12%
Total Polled	41,498	78.67%	722,437	77.37%	9,826,908	69.51%
Registered Electors	52,747		933,754		14,136,979	

=== 1999 Sri Lankan Presidential Election ===
Party	Ududumbara		Kandy Electoral District		Sri Lanka	
Party	Votes	%	Votes	%	Votes	%
PA	18,216	50.61%	308,187	50.29%	4,312,157	51.12%
UNP	16,335	45.38%	276,360	45.10%	3,602,748	42.71%
Other Parties (with < 1%)	810	2.25%	12,752	2.08%	176,679	2.09%
JVP	632	1.76%	15,512	2.53%	343,927	4.08%
Valid Votes	35,993	97.50%	612,811	97.29%	8,435,754	97.69%
Rejected Votes	922	2.50%	17,060	2.71%	199,536	2.31%
Total Polled	36,915	78.81%	629,871	77.61%	8,635,290	72.17%
Registered Electors	46,840		811,606		11,965,536	

=== 1994 Sri Lankan Presidential Election ===
Party	Ududumbara		Kandy Electoral District		Sri Lanka	
Party	Votes	%	Votes	%	Votes	%
PA	22,944	64.75%	320,110	56.64%	4,709,205	62.28%
UNP	11,906	33.60%	235,519	41.68%	2,715,283	35.91%
Other Parties (with < 1%)	585	1.65%	9,488	1.68%	137,040	1.81%
Valid Votes	35,435	97.54%	565,117	97.55%	7,561,526	98.03%
Rejected Votes	892	2.46%	14,179	2.45%	151,706	1.97%
Total Polled	36,327	85.07%	579,296	77.85%	7,713,232	69.12%
Registered Electors	42,700		744,151		11,158,880	

=== 1988 Sri Lankan Presidential Election ===
Party	Ududumbara		Kandy Electoral District		Sri Lanka	
Party	Votes	%	Votes	%	Votes	%
SLFP	12,466	50.22%	186,187	43.65%	2,289,857	44.95%
UNP	12,032	48.47%	234,124	54.88%	2,569,199	50.43%
SLMP	324	1.31%	6,266	1.47%	235,701	4.63%
Valid Votes	24,822	98.47%	426,577	98.57%	5,094,754	98.24%
Rejected Votes	386	1.53%	6,167	1.43%	91,499	1.76%
Total Polled	25,208	67.50%	432,744	68.36%	5,186,256	55.87%
Registered Electors	37,345		633,030		9,283,143	

=== 1982 Sri Lankan Presidential Election ===
Party	Ududumbara		Kandy Electoral District		Sri Lanka	
Party	Votes	%	Votes	%	Votes	%
UNP	15,284	54.14%	289,621	59.80%	3,450,815	52.93%
SLFP	12,242	43.37%	178,647	36.89%	2,546,348	39.05%
JVP	456	1.62%	12,493	2.58%	273,428	4.19%
Other Parties (with < 1%)	246	0.87%	3,536	0.73%	249,460	3.83%
Valid Votes	28,228	98.75%	484,297	99.07%	6,520,156	98.78%
Rejected Votes	358	1.25%	4,548	0.93%	80,470	1.22%
Total Polled	28,586	89.93%	488,845	89.44%	6,600,626	80.15%
Registered Electors	31,788		546,565		8,235,358	

== Parliamentary Election Results ==
=== Summary ===
The winner of Ududumbara has matched the final country result 5 out of 7 times. Hence, Ududumbara is a Weak Bellwether for Parliamentary Elections.

Year	Ududumbara	Kandy Electoral District	MAE %	Sri Lanka	MAE %
2015	UPFA	UNP	10.18%	UNP	4.05%
2010	UPFA	UPFA	9.76%	UPFA	8.12%
2004	UPFA	UNP	7.68%	UPFA	6.71%
2001	UNP	UNP	1.63%	UNP	4.84%
2000	PA	PA	4.40%	PA	4.90%
1994	UNP	UNP	0.75%	PA	4.17%
1989	UNP	UNP	1.84%	UNP	7.34%
Matches/Mean MAE	5/7	5/7	5.18%	7/7	5.73%

=== 2015 Sri Lankan Parliamentary Election ===
Party	Ududumbara		Kandy Electoral District		Sri Lanka	
Party	Votes	%	Votes	%	Votes	%
UPFA	21,919	51.34%	309,152	39.00%	4,732,664	42.48%
UNP	19,674	46.08%	440,761	55.61%	5,098,916	45.77%
JVP	876	2.05%	30,669	3.87%	544,154	4.88%
Other Parties (with < 1%)	222	0.52%	12,055	1.52%	100,088	0.90%
Valid Votes	42,691	94.70%	792,637	95.48%	11,140,333	95.35%
Rejected Votes	2,368	5.25%	37,065	4.46%	516,926	4.42%
Total Polled	45,082	76.88%	830,165	79.13%	11,684,111	77.66%
Registered Electors	58,637		1,049,160		15,044,490	

=== 2010 Sri Lankan Parliamentary Election ===
Party	Ududumbara		Kandy Electoral District		Sri Lanka	
Party	Votes	%	Votes	%	Votes	%
UPFA	20,851	71.86%	339,819	60.81%	4,846,388	60.38%
UNP	7,544	26.00%	192,798	34.50%	2,357,057	29.37%
DNA	521	1.80%	23,728	4.25%	441,251	5.50%
Other Parties (with < 1%)	100	0.34%	2,459	0.44%	30,354	0.38%
Valid Votes	29,016	87.34%	558,804	90.49%	8,026,322	96.03%
Rejected Votes	4,163	12.53%	58,333	9.45%	581,465	6.96%
Total Polled	33,223	59.72%	617,559	61.70%	8,358,246	59.29%
Registered Electors	55,629		1,000,861		14,097,690	

=== 2004 Sri Lankan Parliamentary Election ===
Party	Ududumbara		Kandy Electoral District		Sri Lanka	
Party	Votes	%	Votes	%	Votes	%
UPFA	18,319	53.80%	268,131	42.71%	4,223,126	45.70%
UNP	15,285	44.89%	313,859	49.99%	3,486,792	37.73%
Other Parties (with < 1%)	445	1.31%	45,876	7.31%	616,950	6.68%
Valid Votes	34,049	90.08%	627,866	93.24%	9,241,931	94.52%
Rejected Votes	3,749	9.92%	45,484	6.75%	534,452	5.47%
Total Polled	37,798	73.59%	673,380	76.47%	9,777,821	75.74%
Registered Electors	51,360		880,634		12,909,631	

=== 2001 Sri Lankan Parliamentary Election ===
Party	Ududumbara		Kandy Electoral District		Sri Lanka	
Party	Votes	%	Votes	%	Votes	%
UNP	17,477	51.70%	314,297	52.77%	4,086,026	45.62%
PA	14,110	41.74%	233,637	39.23%	3,330,815	37.19%
JVP	1,695	5.01%	37,146	6.24%	815,353	9.10%
Other Parties (with < 1%)	524	1.55%	10,496	1.76%	129,347	1.44%
Valid Votes	33,806	89.55%	595,576	93.40%	8,955,844	94.77%
Rejected Votes	3,946	10.45%	42,103	6.60%	494,009	5.23%
Total Polled	37,752	76.23%	637,679	76.03%	9,449,878	76.03%
Registered Electors	49,524		838,687		12,428,762	

=== 2000 Sri Lankan Parliamentary Election ===
Party	Ududumbara		Kandy Electoral District		Sri Lanka	
Party	Votes	%	Votes	%	Votes	%
PA	17,897	54.04%	282,282	46.66%	3,899,329	45.33%
UNP	13,825	41.75%	243,623	40.27%	3,451,765	40.12%
JVP	744	2.25%	21,565	3.56%	518,725	6.03%
Other Parties (with < 1%)	650	1.96%	57,458	9.50%	475,261	5.52%
Valid Votes	33,116	N/A	604,928	N/A	8,602,617	N/A

=== 1994 Sri Lankan Parliamentary Election ===
Party	Ududumbara		Kandy Electoral District		Sri Lanka	
Party	Votes	%	Votes	%	Votes	%
UNP	18,116	51.88%	301,824	52.35%	3,498,370	44.04%
PA	16,590	47.51%	267,683	46.43%	3,887,805	48.94%
Other Parties (with < 1%)	210	0.60%	7,045	1.22%	175,576	2.21%
Valid Votes	34,916	94.20%	576,552	94.89%	7,943,688	95.20%
Rejected Votes	2,149	5.80%	31,019	5.11%	400,395	4.80%
Total Polled	37,065	86.80%	607,571	81.67%	8,344,095	74.75%
Registered Electors	42,700		743,939		11,163,064	

=== 1989 Sri Lankan Parliamentary Election ===
Party	Ududumbara		Kandy Electoral District		Sri Lanka	
Party	Votes	%	Votes	%	Votes	%
UNP	16,255	62.32%	204,973	61.72%	2,838,005	50.71%
SLFP	9,373	35.93%	105,977	31.91%	1,785,369	31.90%
USA	263	1.01%	5,147	1.55%	141,983	2.54%
Other Parties (with < 1%)	194	0.74%	16,012	4.82%	269,739	4.82%
Valid Votes	26,085	90.98%	332,109	93.69%	5,596,468	93.87%
Rejected Votes	2,585	9.02%	22,374	6.31%	365,563	6.13%
Total Polled	28,670	77.65%	354,483	56.42%	5,962,031	63.60%
Registered Electors	36,923		628,317		9,374,164	

== Demographics ==
=== Ethnicity ===
The Ududumbara Polling Division has a Sinhalese majority (96.9%) . In comparison, the Kandy Electoral District (which contains the Ududumbara Polling Division) has a Sinhalese majority (74.4%) and a significant Moor population (13.9%)

Ethnicity in Ududumbara
1. Sinhalese (96.9%)
2. Sri Lankan Tamil (1.20%)
3. Indian Tamil (1.20%)
4. Other (0.70%)

=== Religion ===
The Ududumbara Polling Division has a Buddhist majority (96.8%) . In comparison, the Kandy Electoral District (which contains the Ududumbara Polling Division) has a Buddhist majority (73.4%) and a significant Muslim population (14.3%)

Religion in Ududumbara
1. Buddhist (96.8%)
2. Hindu (2.20%)
3. Other (1.00%)
