= Padmalal de Alwis =

Sri Lankan politician

- Incumbent
- Assumed office 1977

Padmalal de Alwis is a Sri Lankan politician and a member of the Central Provincial Council. He is a member of the United National Party. He is known as 'Kalu Aliya'. He is the acting president in the Central Provincial Council as an opposition member.

Personal Details
| Nationality | Sri Lankan |
| Political Party | United National Party |
| Spouse | Indrani De Alwis |
| Children | Roshan De Alwis, Chamal De Alwis, Sajith De Alwis |
| Residence | No.446/A, Matale road, Alawathugoda, kandy |
| District | Kandy District |
| Religion | Buddhist |

== Early life ==
De Alwis was born and raised in Kandy. His father was a businessman who owned mills island wide.

== Politics ==
De Alwis was a member in the United National Party from 1977 to 1997. In 1997 he was elected to the Akurana Pradhesha Saba with the most votes of a Sinhala leader in Akurana Electorate. In 2003 he became Vice Chairman in Akurana pradesha saba as the 1st Sinhala leader to obtain more than 6000 votes in Akurana Electorate. In 2004 he was elected to the Central Provincial Council from Kandy District, Harispaththuwa seat. He became the chief Organizer in Galagedara seat in 2014. He exceeded more than 21000 votes in 2013.

== Public Work ==
He was a social worker who helped people without discrimination. He made 200 houses for the poor with his private funds and Canadian funds received with his personal contacts. He launched a programme to distribute spectacles free of charge worth Rs.2800 each. He annually distributes books, bags and other accessories for the education of poor children. He helps temples, mosques, churches and other religions to promote social well-being.

== Family and personal life ==
De alwis is married to Indrani de Alwis from a prestige family in kandyan kingdom, who is the daughter of Rambanda Ekanayake, the owner of Udadeniya Walawwa. He has three sons.
