= Ananda Aluthgamage =

Sri Lankan politician

Hon. Ananda Aluthgamage MP

Member of Parliament for Kandy District
- In office 2015–2020

Personal details
- Party: United National Party

Ananda Aluthgamage is a Sri Lankan businessman, politician and member of the Parliament of Sri Lanka. He was elected from Kandy District in 2015.
