= Prasanna Gunasena =

Sri Lankan surgeon and politician

Dr. Prasanna Gunasena ප්‍රසන්න ගුණසේන

Surgeon

Personal details
- Education: Nalanda College Colombo
- Occupation: Neurosurgeon
- Profession: Doctor
- Known for: First Sri Lankan Neurosurgeon to perform Balloon Kyphoplasty; Chairman of State Pharmaceutical Corporation (SPC)

Dr Prasanna Gunasena is a consultant neurosurgeon. As a doctor, he is attached to Lanka Hospitals in Sri Lanka, also the Chairman of State Pharmaceutical Company (SPC) of Sri Lanka.

== Early life and education ==
Gunasena was educated at Nalanda College Colombo. He holds MBBS, MS Fellowship of the Royal College of Surgeons (Edinburgh) and also a Spinal Fellow (Canada).

== Career ==
He holds the honour of performing the surgery for cervical disc prolapse of the spine and replacement with functional discs for the first time in Sri Lanka. Gunasena is the first Sri Lankan Neurosurgeon to perform Balloon Kyphoplasty surgery for spinal code fractures.

Gunasena was a founding member of the Neurosurgeons Association of Sri Lanka (NSASL).
