= Dimuthu Bandara Abayakoon =

Sri Lankan politician

Hon. Dimuthu Bandara Abayakoon

Member of Parliament for Kandy District
- In office 2001–2010

Personal details
- Born: 6 September 1971 (age 54)
- Party: Janatha Vimukthi Peramuna
- Education: Dharmaraja College

Dimuthu Bandara Abayakoon (born September 6, 1971) is a Sri Lankan politician, belonging to the Janatha Vimukthi Peramuna. In the 2004 election he was elected as a representative of Kandy District in the Parliament of Sri Lanka, standing as a United People's Freedom Alliance candidate. He resides in Kandy. He is an alumnus of Dharmaraja College.
