= Hurikaduwa South Grama Niladhari Division =

Hurikaduwa South
- Grama Niladhari Division
- Interactive map of Hurikaduwa South
- Coordinates: 7.306150°N 80.698566°E
- Country: Sri Lanka
- Province: Central Province
- District: Kandy District
- Divisional Secretariat: Kundasale Divisional Secretariat
- Electoral District: Kandy Electoral District
- Polling Division: Kundasale Polling Division

Area
  - Total: 0.65 km^{2} (0.25 sq mi)
- Elevation: 483 m (1,585 ft)

Population (2012)
  - Total: 1,077
  - Density: 1,657/km^{2} (4,290/sq mi)
- ISO 3166 code: LK-2127230

Hurikaduwa South

Hurikaduwa South Grama Niladhari Division is a Grama Niladhari Division of the Kundasale Divisional Secretariat of Kandy District of Central Province, Sri Lanka. It has Grama Niladhari Division Code 679.

Hurikaduwa, Nituletenna, Alakolamaditta and Nittultenna are located within, nearby or associated with Hurikaduwa South.

Hurikaduwa South is a surrounded by the Dodamgolla, Hurikaduwa East, Hurikaduwa North and Manikhinna Grama Niladhari Divisions.

== Demographics ==
=== Ethnicity ===
The Hurikaduwa South Grama Niladhari Division has a Sinhalese majority (99.8%). In comparison, the Kundasale Divisional Secretariat (which contains the Hurikaduwa South Grama Niladhari Division) has a Sinhalese majority (82.6%)

Ethnicity in Hurikaduwa South
1. Sinhalese (99.8%)
2. Other (0.20%)

=== Religion ===
The Hurikaduwa South Grama Niladhari Division has a Buddhist majority (99.6%). In comparison, the Kundasale Divisional Secretariat (which contains the Hurikaduwa South Grama Niladhari Division) has a Buddhist majority (81.4%)

Religion in Hurikaduwa South
1. Buddhist (99.6%)
2. Other (0.40%)
