= Sirimalwatte Pallegama Grama Niladhari Division =

Sirimalwatte Pallegama
- Grama Niladhari Division
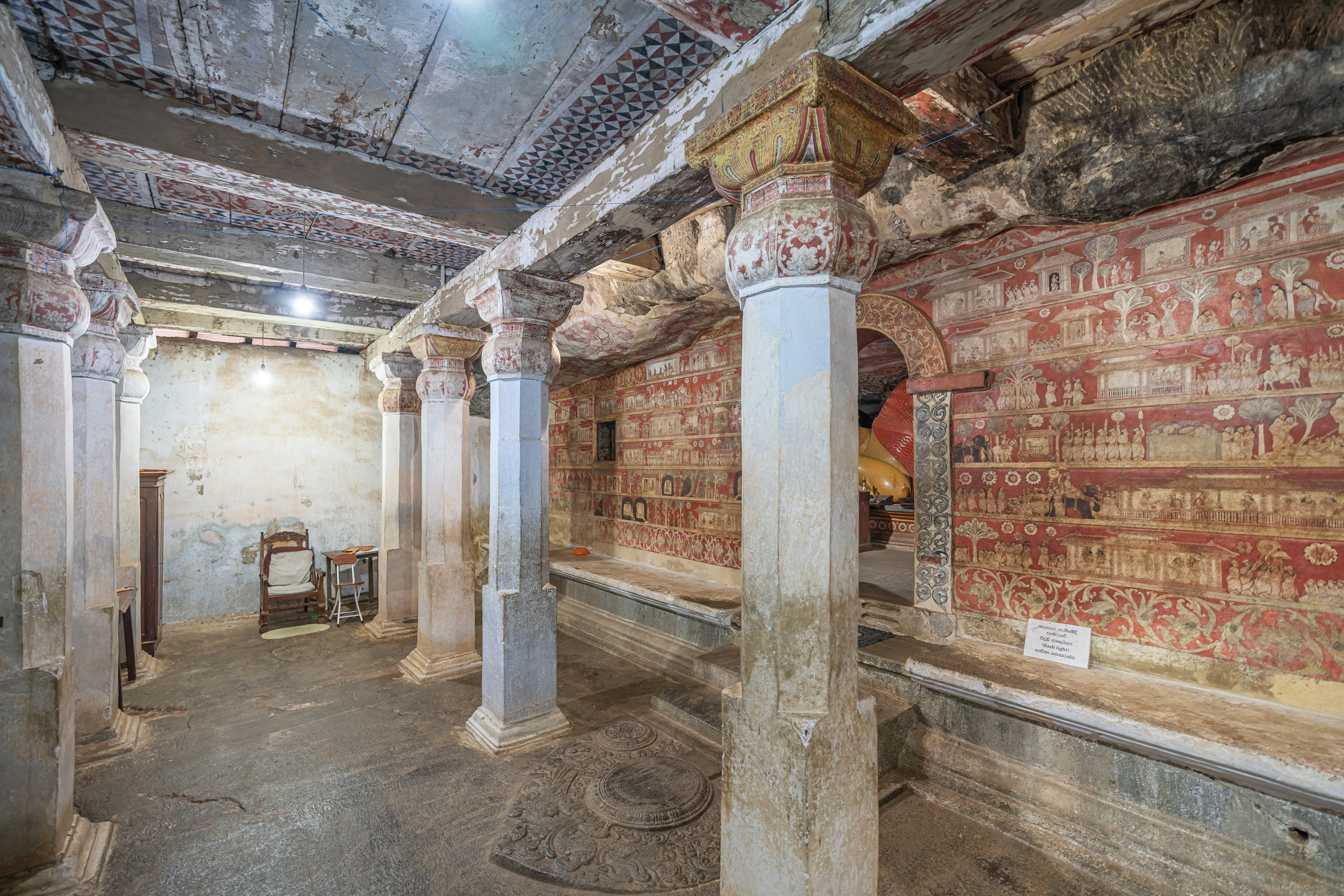
- Degaldoruwa Raja Maha Vihara is located within, nearby or associated with the Sirimalwatte Pallegama Grama Niladhari Division
- Interactive map of Sirimalwatte Pallegama
- Coordinates: 7.302707°N 80.661223°E
- Country: Sri Lanka
- Province: Central Province
- District: Kandy District
- Divisional Secretariat: Kundasale Divisional Secretariat
- Electoral District: Kandy Electoral District
- Polling Division: Kundasale Polling Division

Area
  - Total: 0.43 km^{2} (0.17 sq mi)
- Elevation: 496 m (1,627 ft)

Population (2012)
  - Total: 1,234
  - Density: 2,870/km^{2} (7,400/sq mi)
- ISO 3166 code: LK-2127190

Sirimalwatte Pallegama

Sirimalwatte Pallegama Grama Niladhari Division is a Grama Niladhari Division of the Kundasale Divisional Secretariat of Kandy District of Central Province, Sri Lanka. It has Grama Niladhari Division Code 653.

Degaldoruwa Raja Maha Vihara and Yakgahapitiya are located within, nearby or associated with Sirimalwatte Pallegama.

Sirimalwatte Pallegama is a surrounded by the Deekirimadawala, Amunugama South, Degaldoruwa, Lewellagama and Sirimalwatta East Grama Niladhari Divisions.

== Demographics ==
=== Ethnicity ===
The Sirimalwatte Pallegama Grama Niladhari Division has a Sinhalese majority (98.7%). In comparison, the Kundasale Divisional Secretariat (which contains the Sirimalwatte Pallegama Grama Niladhari Division) has a Sinhalese majority (82.6%)

Ethnicity in Sirimalwatte Pallegama
1. Sinhalese (98.7%)
2. Other (1.30%)

=== Religion ===
The Sirimalwatte Pallegama Grama Niladhari Division has a Buddhist majority (98.6%). In comparison, the Kundasale Divisional Secretariat (which contains the Sirimalwatte Pallegama Grama Niladhari Division) has a Buddhist majority (81.4%)

Religion in Sirimalwatte Pallegama
1. Buddhist (98.6%)
2. Muslim (1.30%)
3. Other (0.10%)

== Gallery ==
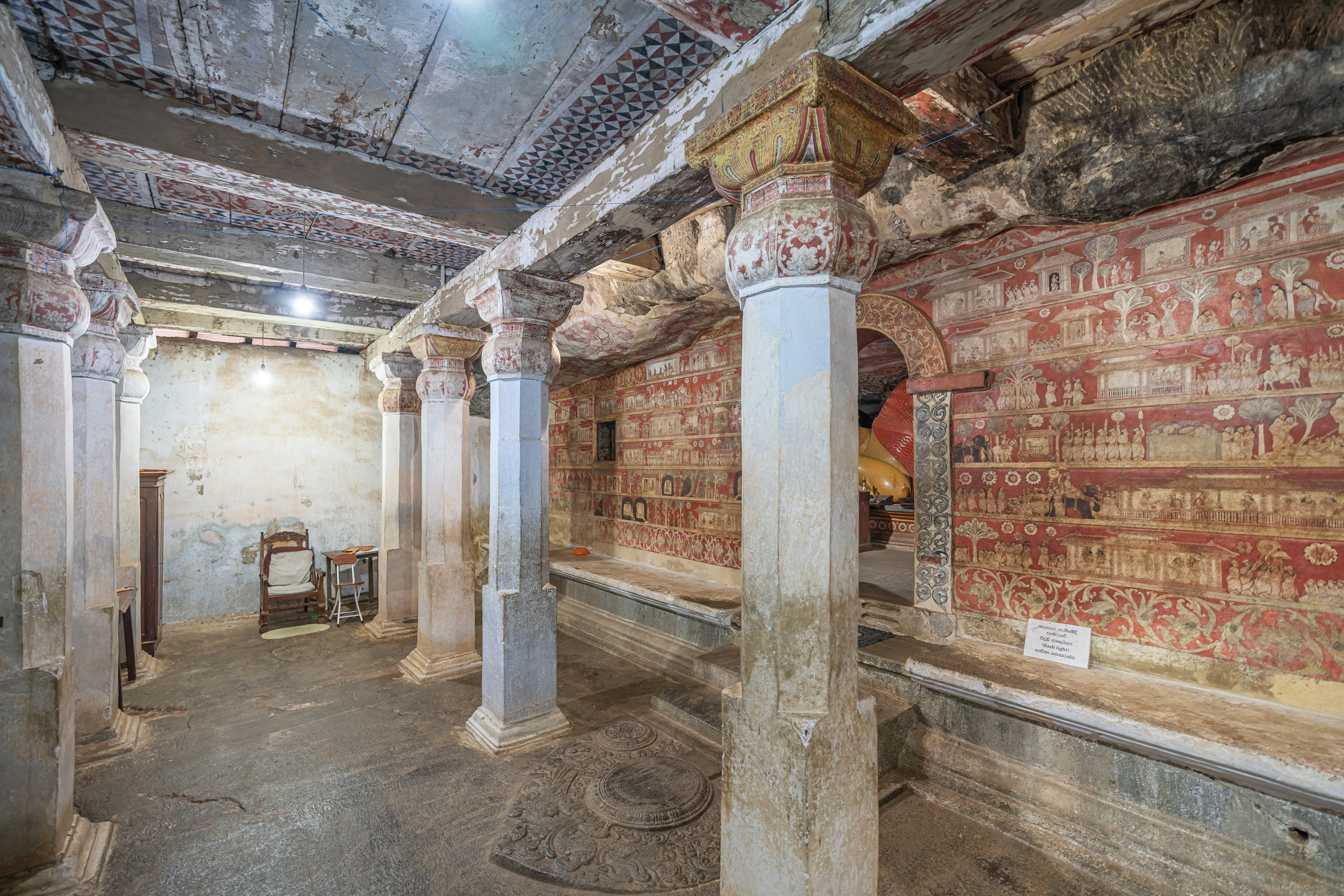
Degaldoruwa Raja Maha Vihara
