= Bootawatta South Grama Niladhari Division =

Bootawatta South
- Grama Niladhari Division
- Interactive map of Bootawatta South
- Coordinates: 7.235877°N 80.699823°E
- Country: Sri Lanka
- Province: Central Province
- District: Kandy District
- Divisional Secretariat: Pathahewaheta Divisional Secretariat
- Electoral District: Kandy Electoral District
- Polling Division: Hewaheta Polling Division

Area
  - Total: 0.77 km^{2} (0.30 sq mi)
- Elevation: 138 m (453 ft)

Population (2012)
  - Total: 613
  - Density: 796/km^{2} (2,060/sq mi)
- ISO 3166 code: LK-2145190

Bootawatta South

Bootawatta South Grama Niladhari Division is Grama Niladhari Division of the Pathahewaheta Divisional Secretariat of Kandy District of Central Province, Sri Lanka. It has Grama Niladhari Division Code 985.

Bootawatta South is a surrounded by the Godamunna West, Kapuliyadda West, Ankelipitiya, Bootawatta North, Doolmure, Narangasthenna and Nugaliyadda Pahala Grama Niladhari Divisions.

== Demographics ==
=== Ethnicity ===
The Bootawatta South Grama Niladhari Division has a Sinhalese majority (100.0%). In comparison, the Pathahewaheta Divisional Secretariat (which contains the Bootawatta South Grama Niladhari Division) has a Sinhalese majority (90.1%)

Ethnicity in Bootawatta South
1. Sinhalese (100.0%)
2. Other (0.00%)

=== Religion ===
The Bootawatta South Grama Niladhari Division has a Buddhist majority (99.8%). In comparison, the Pathahewaheta Divisional Secretariat (which contains the Bootawatta South Grama Niladhari Division) has a Buddhist majority (89.5%)

Religion in Bootawatta South
1. Buddhist (99.8%)
2. Other (0.20%)
