= Ankumbura (disambiguation) =

Ankumbura is a village in Sri Lanka. Ankumbura may also refer to the following villages in Sri Lanka

- Ankumbura Pallegama
- Ankumbura Udagama
