= Mahawatta South Grama Niladhari Division =

Mahawatta South
- Grama Niladhari Division
- Interactive map of Mahawatta South
- Coordinates: 7.291693°N 80.675621°E
- Country: Sri Lanka
- Province: Central Province
- District: Kandy District
- Divisional Secretariat: Kundasale Divisional Secretariat
- Electoral District: Kandy Electoral District
- Polling Division: Kundasale Polling Division

Area
  - Total: 0.86 km^{2} (0.33 sq mi)
- Elevation: 135 m (443 ft)

Population (2012)
  - Total: 1,321
  - Density: 1,536/km^{2} (3,980/sq mi)
- ISO 3166 code: LK-2127325

Mahawatta South

Mahawatta South Grama Niladhari Division is a Grama Niladhari Division of the Kundasale Divisional Secretariat of Kandy District of Central Province, Sri Lanka. It has Grama Niladhari Division Code 687.

Mahawatta South is a surrounded by the Galapitaambe, Hapuwala, Mahawatta East, Pilawala South, Galmaduwa, Arangala North, Arangala South, Mahawatta West and Nattarampotha Grama Niladhari Divisions.

== Demographics ==
=== Ethnicity ===
The Mahawatta South Grama Niladhari Division has a Sinhalese majority (98.6%). In comparison, the Kundasale Divisional Secretariat (which contains the Mahawatta South Grama Niladhari Division) has a Sinhalese majority (82.6%)

Ethnicity in Mahawatta South
1. Sinhalese (98.6%)
2. Other (1.40%)

=== Religion ===
The Mahawatta South Grama Niladhari Division has a Buddhist majority (97.0%). In comparison, the Kundasale Divisional Secretariat (which contains the Mahawatta South Grama Niladhari Division) has a Buddhist majority (81.4%)

Religion in Mahawatta South
1. Buddhist (97.0%)
2. Roman Catholic (1.60%)
3. Other (1.40%)
