= Udamailapitiya North Grama Niladhari Division =

Udamailapitiya North
- Grama Niladhari Division
- Interactive map of Udamailapitiya North
- Coordinates: 7.223100°N 80.752252°E
- Country: Sri Lanka
- Province: Central Province
- District: Kandy District
- Divisional Secretariat: Pathahewaheta Divisional Secretariat
- Electoral District: Kandy Electoral District
- Polling Division: Hewaheta Polling Division

Area
  - Total: 1.28 km^{2} (0.49 sq mi)
- Elevation: 568 m (1,864 ft)

Population (2012)
  - Total: 978
  - Density: 764/km^{2} (1,980/sq mi)
- ISO 3166 code: LK-2145225

Udamailapitiya North

Udamailapitiya North Grama Niladhari Division is a Grama Niladhari Division of the Pathahewaheta Divisional Secretariat of Kandy District of Central Province, Sri Lanka. It has Grama Niladhari Division Code 1002.

Udamailapitiya North is a surrounded by the Pathamailapitiya North, Pathamailapitiya South, Kethigannawela and Udamailapitiya South Grama Niladhari Divisions.

== Demographics ==
=== Ethnicity ===
The Udamailapitiya North Grama Niladhari Division has a Sinhalese majority (96.3%). In comparison, the Pathahewaheta Divisional Secretariat (which contains the Udamailapitiya North Grama Niladhari Division) has a Sinhalese majority (90.1%)

Ethnicity in Udamailapitiya North
1. Sinhalese (96.3%)
2. Sri Lankan Tamil (3.40%)
3. Other (0.30%)

=== Religion ===
The Udamailapitiya North Grama Niladhari Division has a Buddhist majority (91.9%) and a Christian minority (7.0%). In comparison, the Pathahewaheta Divisional Secretariat (which contains the Udamailapitiya North Grama Niladhari Division) has a Buddhist majority (89.5%)

Religion in Udamailapitiya North
1. Buddhist (91.9%)
2. Other Christian (7.00%)
3. Other (1.10%)
