= Kosgama (Panvila) Grama Niladhari Division =

Kosgama
- Grama Niladhari Division
- Interactive map of Kosgama
- Coordinates: 7.417092°N 80.753336°E
- Country: Sri Lanka
- Province: Central Province
- District: Kandy District
- Divisional Secretariat: Panvila Divisional Secretariat
- Electoral District: Kandy Electoral District
- Polling Division: Pathadumbara Polling Division

Area
  - Total: 11.17 km^{2} (4.31 sq mi)
- Elevation: 1,158 m (3,799 ft)

Population (2012)
  - Total: 2,497
  - Density: 224/km^{2} (580/sq mi)
- ISO 3166 code: LK-2115020

Kosgama

Kosgama Grama Niladhari Division is a Grama Niladhari Division of the Panvila Divisional Secretariat of Kandy District of Central Province, Sri Lanka. It has Grama Niladhari Division Code 739.

Kosgama is a surrounded by the Etanwala, Mahapathana, Thawalanthenna, Beddegama, Arattana, Madulkele and Watakele Grama Niladhari Divisions.

== Demographics ==
=== Ethnicity ===
The Kosgama Grama Niladhari Division has an Indian Tamil majority (57.4%), a significant Sinhalese population (23.1%) and a significant Moor population (11.8%). In comparison, the Panvila Divisional Secretariat (which contains the Kosgama Grama Niladhari Division) has an Indian Tamil plurality (49.5%) and a significant Sinhalese population (38.3%)

Ethnicity in Kosgama
1. Indian Tamil (57.4%)
2. Sinhalese (23.1%)
3. Moor (11.8%)
4. Sri Lankan Tamil (7.70%)
5. Other (0.00%)

=== Religion ===
The Kosgama Grama Niladhari Division has a Hindu majority (63.3%), a significant Buddhist population (23.4%) and a significant Muslim population (11.8%). In comparison, the Panvila Divisional Secretariat (which contains the Kosgama Grama Niladhari Division) has a Hindu majority (52.2%) and a significant Buddhist population (37.9%)

Religion in Kosgama
1. Hindu (63.3%)
2. Buddhist (23.4%)
3. Muslim (11.8%)
4. Other (1.50%)
