= Godamuduna =

- Village
- Country: Sri Lanka
- Province: Central Province
- District: Kandy District
- Time zone: UTC+5:30 (Sri Lanka Standard Time)

Godamuduna is a village in the Kandy District, Central Province, Sri Lanka. Godamuduna is situated nearby to the locality Masingamedda and the village Malulla.

== See also ==
- List of towns in Central Province, Sri Lanka
