= Pilawala =

Coordinates: 7°18′N 80°41′E

- Village
- Interactive map of Pilawala
- Country: Sri Lanka
- Province: Central Province
- Time zone: UTC+5:30 (Sri Lanka Standard Time)
- Postal code: KY 20196
- Area code: 0812

Pilawala is a village in Kandy, Sri Lanka. It is located within the Central Province, about 9 km easterly from Kandy. There is an Access route via Sirimalwatta - Yakgahapitiya - Menikhinna road or by the Shuttle Bus route Number 621, Menikhinna - Kandy.

It is well known for the ancient temple and the Tamarind tree.

== See also ==
- List of towns in Central Province, Sri Lanka
