= Akurana =

- Town
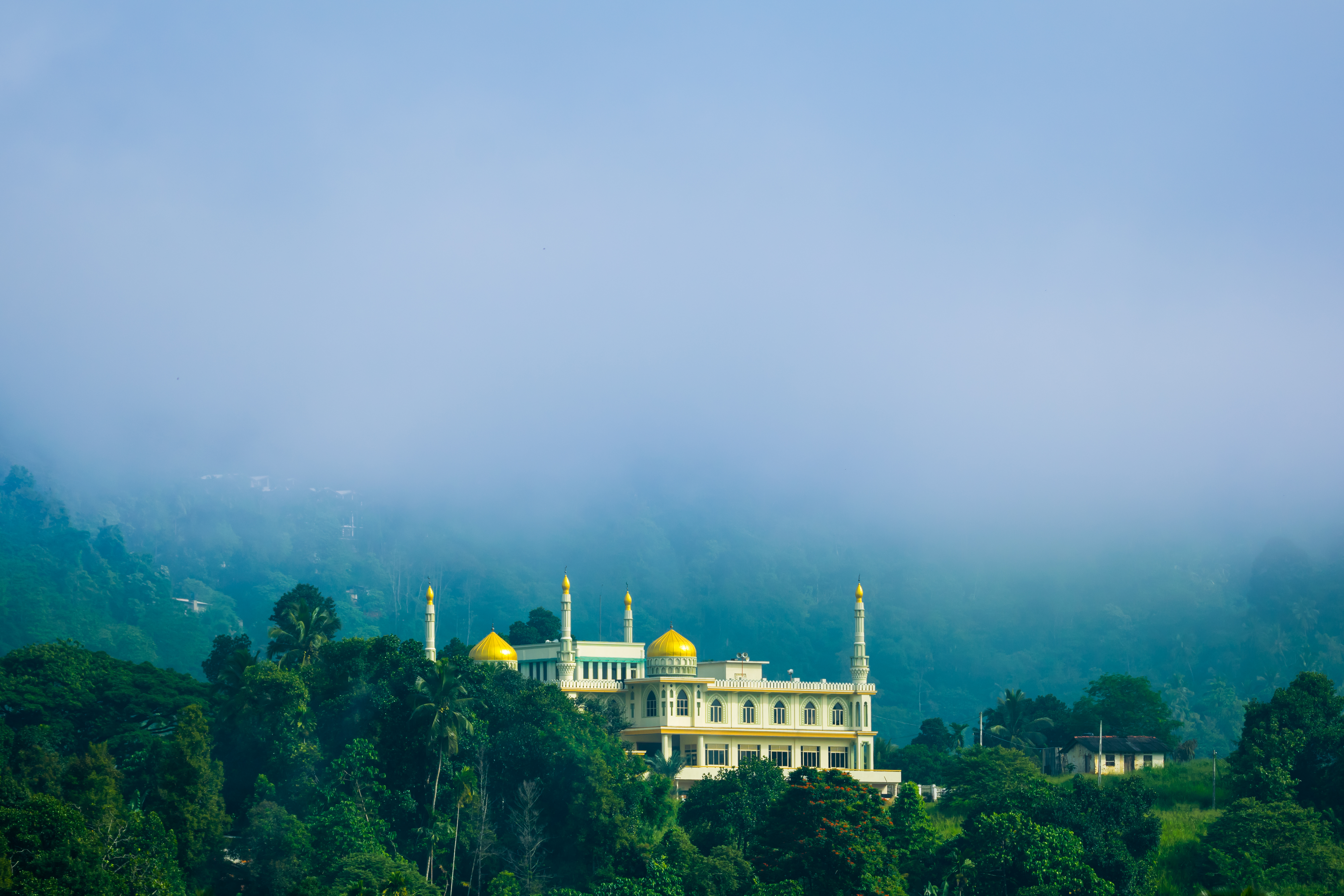
- Akurana Grand Mosque on top of the surrounding hills.

- Location within Sri Lanka
- Coordinates: 7°21′54″N 80°37′02″E
- Country: Sri Lanka
- Province: Central Province
- District: Kandy District
- Divisional Secretariat: Akurana Divisional Secretariat
- Akurana Pradeshiya Sabhawa: 1980s

Government
  - Type: Akurana Pradeshiya Sabha
  - Chairman: I. M. Isthihar

Area
  - Town: 31.0 km^{2} (12.0 sq mi)

Population (2012)
  - Town: 63,397
  - Density: 790/km^{2} (2,045/sq mi)
  - Metro: 63,397
- Time zone: UTC+5:30 (SLST)
- Postal code: 20850
- Area code: 081
- Official languages: Sinhala; Tamil
- Recognised languages: English

Akurana (Sinhala: අකුරණ, Tamil: அக்குறணை) is a suburb of the city of Kandy in the Central Province of Sri Lanka. The town is situated 125 km (78 mi) from Colombo and 10 km (6.2 mi) from the centre of Kandy, on the Kandy-Matale road. Akurana lies along the A9 highway from Kandy to Matale, north of Katugastota. The town is surrounded by hills and rivers. The Balapitiya Oya, a tributary of the Pinga Oya river, runs through Akurana.

Akurana belongs to the Harispattuwa Electorate and was represented in Parliament by former Foreign Minister Abdul Cader Shahul Hameed for more than 33 years without interruption. Akurana area came under the local government authority of the Akurana Pradeshiya Sabhawa in the late 1980s and included the villages of Alawathugoda, Dunuwila, Pangollamada, Bulugohathenna, Waragashinna, Kurundugaha ela, Uggala, Kurugoda, Thelumbgahawaththa, Malgamandeniya and Dippitiya.

== History ==
Local folklore has it that during the reign of a certain "Raja Sinha", three Arabs travelled inland to Kandy. The king allowed them to take three native wives, and the three Arabs settled Akurana. Their descendants would be the Sri Lankan Moors of Akurana.

Its inhabitants lived through trade and were comparatively rich. A small Islamic school operated in 1886.

== Demographics ==
Akurana is a predominantly Muslim town, with a sizable Sinhalese minority and smaller Tamil and Burgher communities.

The majority of the local population speaks Tamil, as well as Sinhala. English is also a widely spoken language.

=== Population by Ethnicity Akurana DS Division ===
Ethnicity
Population	Percent
Moor	63.43%
Sinhalese	29.75%
Indian Tamils	4.21%
Sri Lankan Tamils	2.34%
Others	0.27%

== Climate ==
Akurana has a relatively cool climate due to its location in the central hills. Average daytime temperature is 25 °C (77 °F) and at night falls to 19 °C (66 °F). In December, temperatures drop to an average of 19 °C (66 °F), with heavy mist cover during dawn.

The Polgolla and Moragahakanda dams are believed to have some affects on weather patterns in Akurana. The lowlands are prone to regular flooding where the Haripotha or Ping Oya river flows along with the A9 Road, which joins with the Mahaweli River in Katugastota.

== Education ==
There are three national schools in Akurana: Azhar College, Alawathugoda Central College and Akurana Zahira College. Akurana Muslim Balika College is the only government-owned girls college in Akurana.

In addition to the above schools, there are several provincial schools in the region, which include:

- Azhar Model Primary School
- Darul Uloom Primary Schoo
- Deegala Buddhist School
- Dippitiya Secondary School
- Kasawatta Muslim Primary School
- Kurudugahaela Muslim School
- Kurugoda Muslim Boy's College
- Lukmania Maha Vidyalaya
- Malgamandeniya Muslim Vidyalaya
- Malwanahinna Muslim Vidyalaya
- Mawathupoloa Muslim Vidyalaya
- Neerella Muslim Primary School
- Rambukela Muslim Maha Vidyalaya
- Rathanapala Maha Vidyalaya
- Rathukohodeegala Vidyalaya
- Saddathissa Vidyalaya
- Sarath Ekanayaka Model School
- Sumanasara Primary School
- Thelembugahawatta Muslim School
- Wilana Nandana Maha Vidyalaya
- Wlahena Muslim Vidyalaya
- Yakeen Model Private School

== Healthcare ==
Zia Hospital is the only government hospital in Akurana, providing free healthcare to the public. It was opened by the Pakistani President Muhammad Zia-ul-Haq, during the presidency of J. R. Jayewardene.

== Transport ==
Akurana is located on the A9 highway, making it an easily accessible town. The nearest railway station is in Katugastota, approximately 4.5 km (2.8 mi) away.
