= Amunugama =

Amunugama may refer to:

- Amunugama, Sri Lanka, a village
- Amunugama (surname), including a list of people with the name
