= Naranpanawa =

- Village
- Naranpanawa, Sri Lanka
- Coordinates: 7°21′N 80°44′E
- Country: Sri Lanka
- Province: Central Province
- District: Kandy

Area
  - Total: 2.128 km^{2} (0.822 sq mi)
- Elevation: 550 m (1,800 ft)

Population (2015)
  - Total: 778
- Time zone: UTC+5:30 (Sri Lanka Standard Time)

Naranpanawa is a village in the Kundasale Divisional Secretariat of Kandy District in Central Province, Sri Lanka. Naranpanawa East and Naranpanawa West are the names of Grama Niladhari divisions.

== History ==
In the Ceylon census of 1911, Naranpanawa is listed along with the villages of Naranpanawa Dembatagolla, Naranpanawa Egodagammedda, Naranpanawa Kandegammedda, Naranpanawa Disanekgammedda and Naranpanawa Karagasteima as being under the jurisdiction of one village headman. For administration, all were in the Pallispattu West sub-division of Pata Dumbara in Kandy District.

== See also ==
- List of towns in Central Province, Sri Lanka
