= Uda Galadebokke =

Coordinates: 7°25′N 80°54′E

- Village
- Interactive map of Uda Galadebokke
- Country: Sri Lanka
- Province: Central Province
- District: Kandy
- Time zone: UTC+5:30 (Sri Lanka Standard Time)

Uda Galadebokke is a village in Sri Lanka. It is located within Minipe Divisional Secretariat, Kandy District, Central Province.

== See also ==
- List of towns in Central Province, Sri Lanka
