= Bokkawala =

Bokkawala බොක්කාවල போக்காவல
- Village
- Location in Sri Lanka
- Coordinates: 7°23′N 80°33′E
- Country: Sri Lanka
- Province: Central Province
- District: Kandy District
- Time zone: UTC+5:30 (Sri Lanka Standard Time)
- Postal code: 20093

Bokkawala (බොක්කාවල) is a village in Sri Lanka. It is located within Central Province in Kandy district. While the population is primarily of the Govigama caste, many Gádi (rodí) caste families were relocated there during 1970s.

== See also ==
- List of towns in Central Province, Sri Lanka
