= Gangoda (Udadumbara Divisional Secretariat, Kandy District) =

- Village
- Interactive map of Gangoda
- Coordinates: 7°18′28″N 80°53′28″E
- Country: Sri Lanka
- Province: Central Province
- District: Kandy District
- Divisional secretariat: Udadumbara Divisional Secretariat
- Time zone: UTC+5:30 (Sri Lanka Standard Time)

Gangoda is a village in Kandy District, Central Province, Sri Lanka. It is located southeast of Udadumbara.

== See also ==
- List of towns in Central Province, Sri Lanka
