= Alawathugoda Saman Devalaya =

Devalaya in Alawatugoda, Sri Lanka

Alawathugoda Saman Devalaya අලවතුගොඩ සමන් දේවාලය
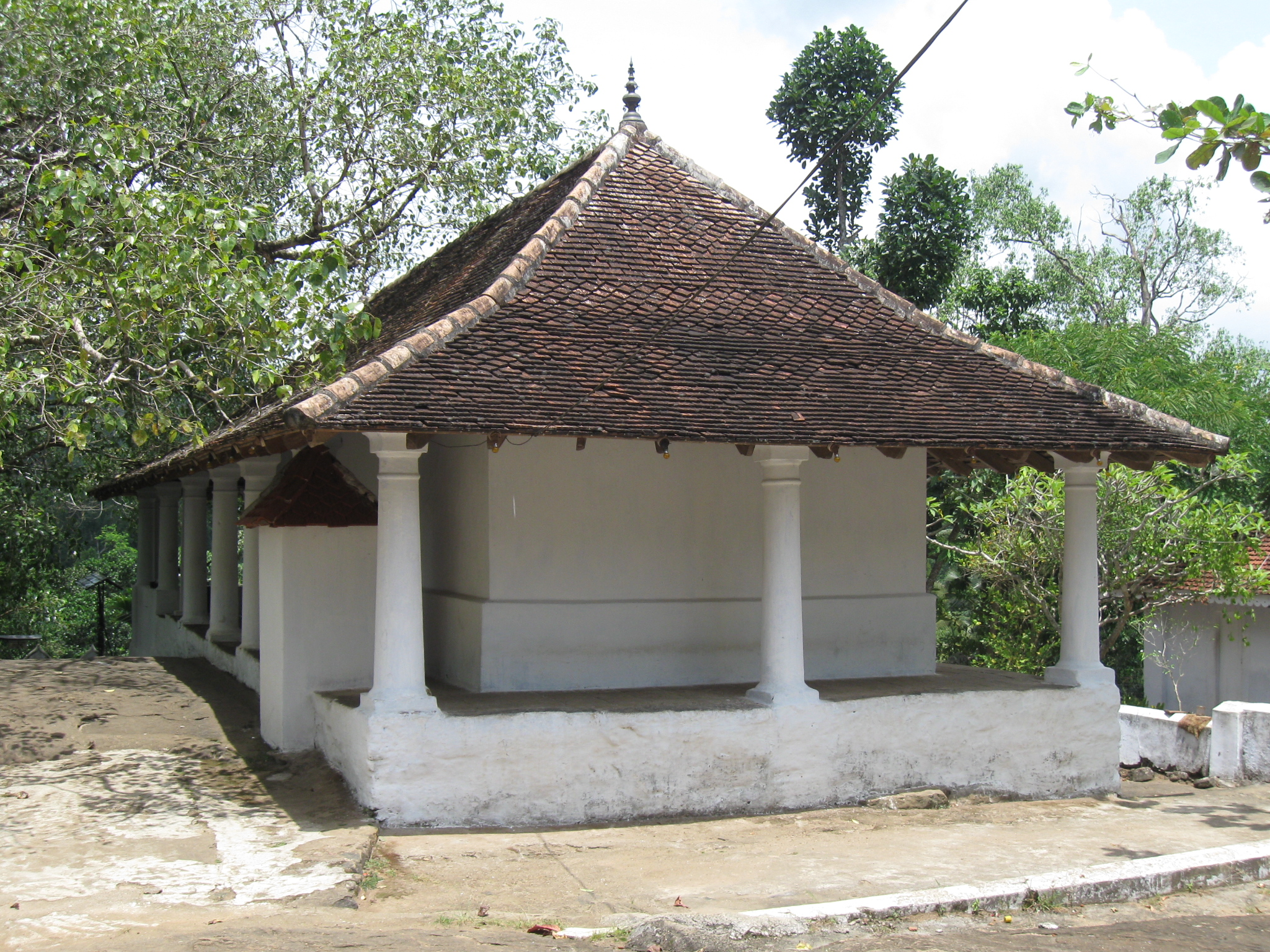

Religion
- Affiliation: Buddhism
- District: Kandy
- Province: Central Province
- Deity: Saman deviyo

Location
- Location: Alawatugoda, Sri Lanka
- Interactive map of Alawathugoda Saman Devalaya අලවතුගොඩ සමන් දේවාලය
- Coordinates: 07°24′20.1″N 80°36′26.6″E

Architecture
- Type: Devalaya
- Founder: King Valagamba
- Archaeological Protected Monument of Sri Lanka
- Designated: 8 April 2009

Alawathugoda Saman Devalaya is an ancient Devalaya, situated in Alawatugoda, Sri Lanka. The shrine is dedicated to Sinhalese deity Saman. The history of the Devalaya is believed to be dated back to the reign of King Walagamba (89–77 BC) of Anuradhapura Kingdom. During the Portuguese era the shrine was burnt down by the Portuguese armies but rebuilt again in 1814. Currently the shrine has been formally recognized by the government as an archaeological protected monument. The designation was declared on 8 April 2009 under the government Gazette number 1597.

== See also ==
- Maha Saman Devalaya

== Notes ==
- "PART I : SECTION (I) — GENERAL Government Notifications" (PDF). The Gazette of the Democratic Socialist Republic of Sri Lanka. 1597. 8 April 2009. Archived from the original (PDF) on 17 April 2022.
