= Abasingammedda =

- Village
- Location in Sri Lanka
- Coordinates: 7°19′N 80°40′E
- Country: Sri Lanka
- Province: Central Province
- District: Kandy District

Population
  - Total: 11,000
- Time zone: +5.30

Abasingammedda is a village in the Kandy District, Central Province, Sri Lanka. The village has a population of around 11,000 and lies 1.62 km (1.01 mi) to the east of Kandy.
