= OAU (disambiguation) =

OAU stands for the Organization of African Unity.

OAU could also refer to:

- Obafemi Awolowo University, a university located in Ile-Ife, Nigeria
- Omdurman Ahlia University, a university located in Omdurman, Sudan
- Operation OAU, a 1968 battle fought in Nigeria
- Old Azharians Union, part of Azhar College in Akurana, Sri Lanka
