= Kapuliyadda =

- Village
- Interactive map of Kapuliyadda
- Country: Sri Lanka
- Province: Central Province
- Time zone: UTC+5:30 (Sri Lanka Standard Time)

Kapuliyadda is a village in Sri Lanka. It is located in Pathahewaheta Divisional Secretariat in Kandy District within Central Province.

== See also ==
- List of towns in Central Province, Sri Lanka
