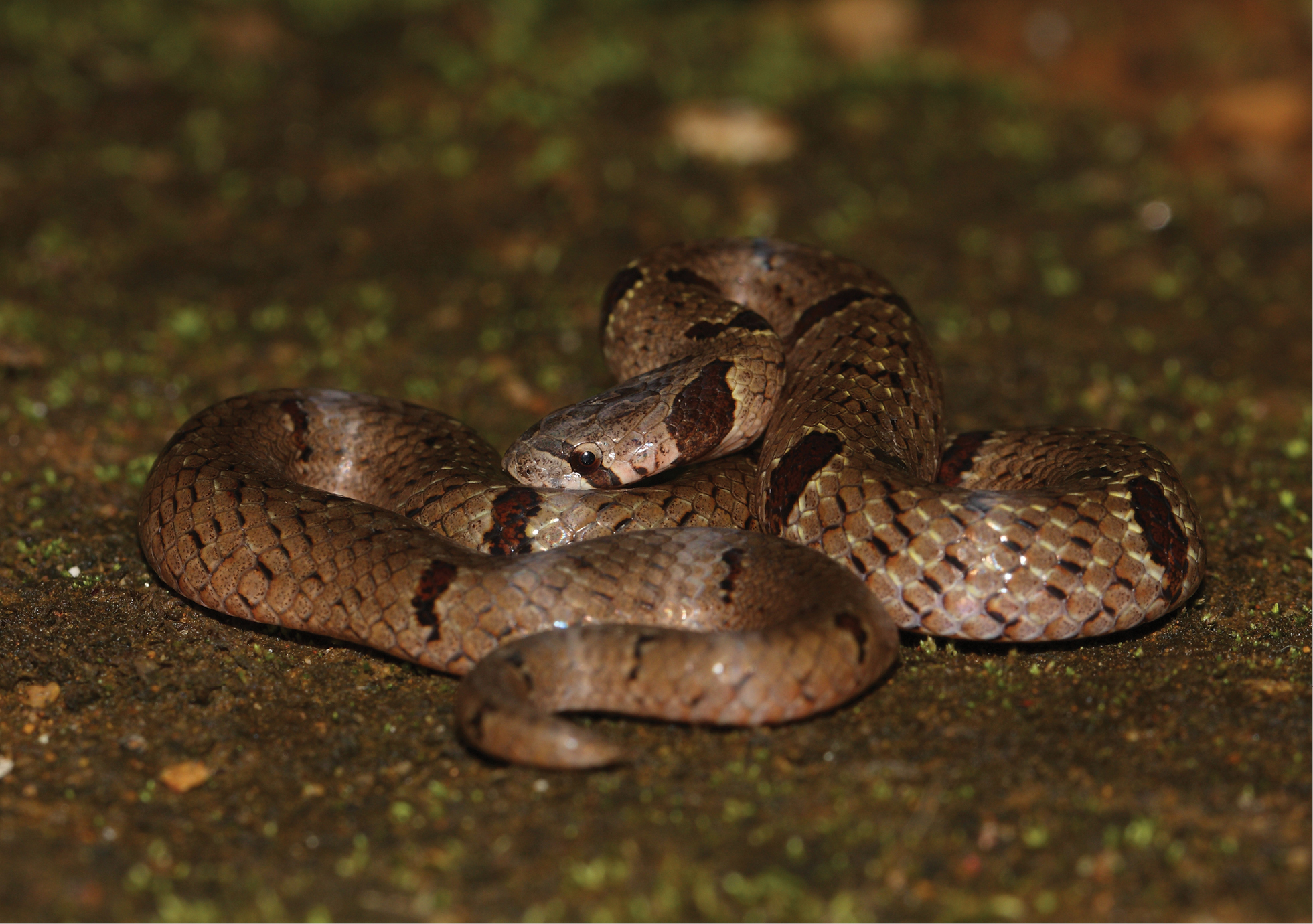

Conservation status
- Vulnerable (IUCN 3.1)

Scientific classification
- Kingdom: Animalia
- Phylum: Chordata
- Class: Reptilia
- Order: Squamata
- Suborder: Serpentes
- Family: Colubridae
- Genus: Oligodon
- Species: O. sublineatus

Binomial name
- Oligodon sublineatus A.M.C. Duméril, Bibron and A.H.A. Duméril, 1854

= Oligodon sublineatus =

Species of snake

Oligodon sublineatus, commonly known as Dumeril's kukri snake is a species of rear-fanged kukri snake found in Sri Lanka.

== Description ==
Body somewhat cylindrical and stout. Head short, and blunt. Dorsum pinkish-brown with small three rows of brown markings. Two lateral rows of linear marks confluent and usually from stripes. Median row of discontinuous spots ending at vent.

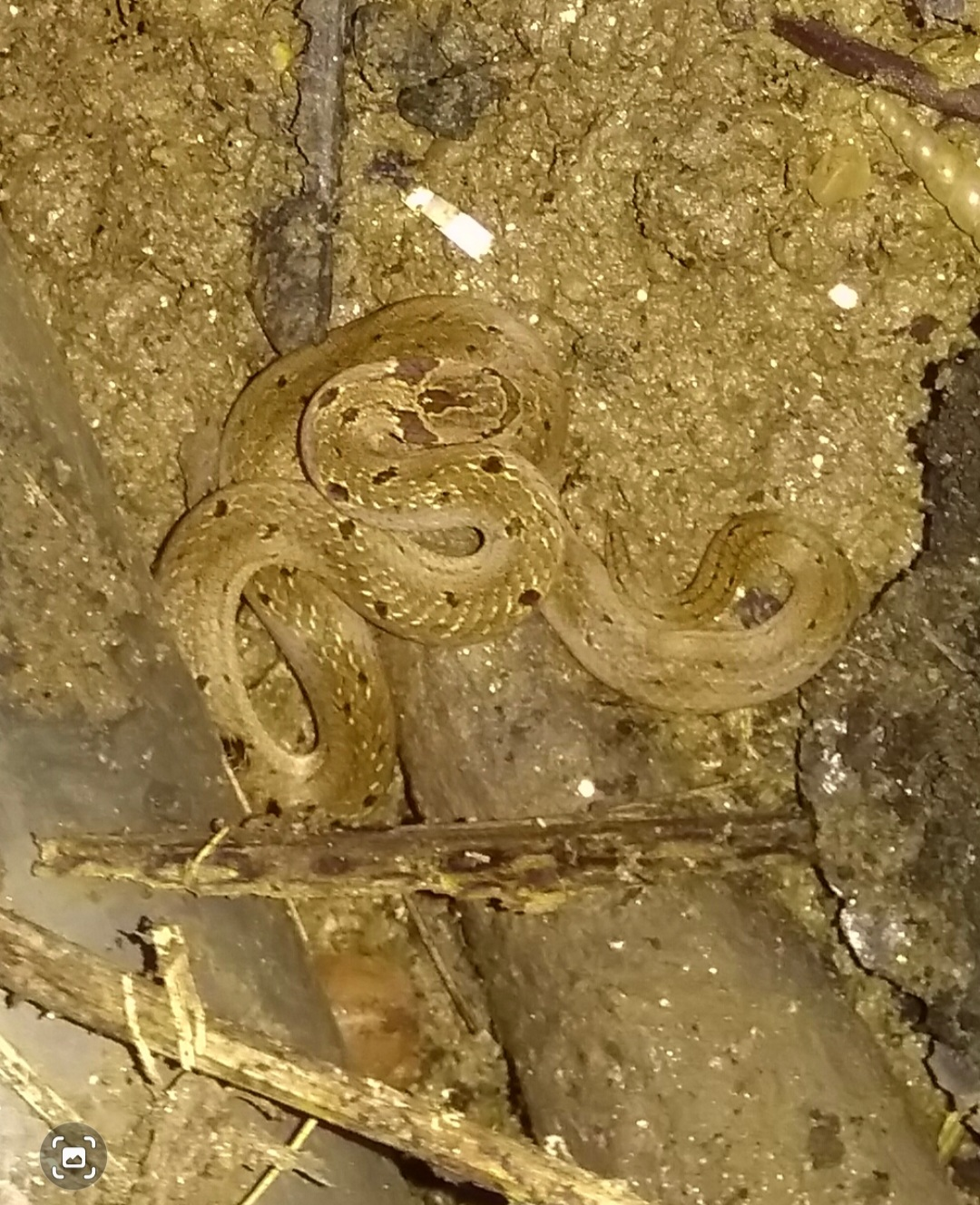
from Sri Lanka

== Distribution ==
It is a common species from the plains and midhills of Sri Lanka. Widespread within he country. Known from the localities such as Kalutara, Mathugama, Gammaduwa, and Knuckles Mountain Range, Kotmale, Ratnapura, Weligalla, Negambo, Nawala, Gampola, Peradeniya, and Kandy in the central hills, as well as localities in dry northern parts of the island.

== Ecology ==
Found in thinly forested areas, often entering human habitation, and usually hides under leaf litter, at elevations up to 1200m. Active during the day as well as at dusk, particularly nocturnal. When threatened, it flattens its body but does not attempt to bite. The blade-like teeth are thought adaptive for cutting up shells of reptile eggs, and small lizards and frog eggs also consumed.
