= Gangoda =

Gangoda may refer to:

- Gangoda (Udadumbara Divisional Secretariat, Kandy District), a village in Udadumbara Divisional Secretariat, Kandy District, Central Province, Sri Lanka
- Gangoda (Udunuwara Divisional Secretariat, Kandy District), a village in Udunuwara Divisional Secretariat, Kandy District, Central Province, Sri Lanka
