= Alakoladeniya =

- Village
- Location within Sri Lanka
- Coordinates: 7°19′52″N 80°39′39″E
- Country: Sri Lanka
- Province: Central Province
- District: Kandy District
- Time zone: UTC+5:30 (Sri Lanka Standard Time)

Alakoladeniya is a village located in Kandy District of Central Province in Sri Lanka.

== See also ==
- List of towns in Central Province, Sri Lanka
