= Adhikarigama =

Adhikarigama Gonaganthenna
- Village
- Location within Sri Lanka
- Coordinates: 7°13′9″N 80°46′41″E
- Country: Sri Lanka
- Province: Central Province
- District: Kandy District

Government 486/C
- Time zone: UTC+5:30 (Sri Lanka Standard Time)

Adhikarigama is a village in Kandy District, Central Province, Sri Lanka.

== See also ==
- List of towns in Central Province, Sri Lanka
