= Nawalapitiya =

Nawalapitiya නාවලපිටිය நாவலப்பிட்டி
- Town
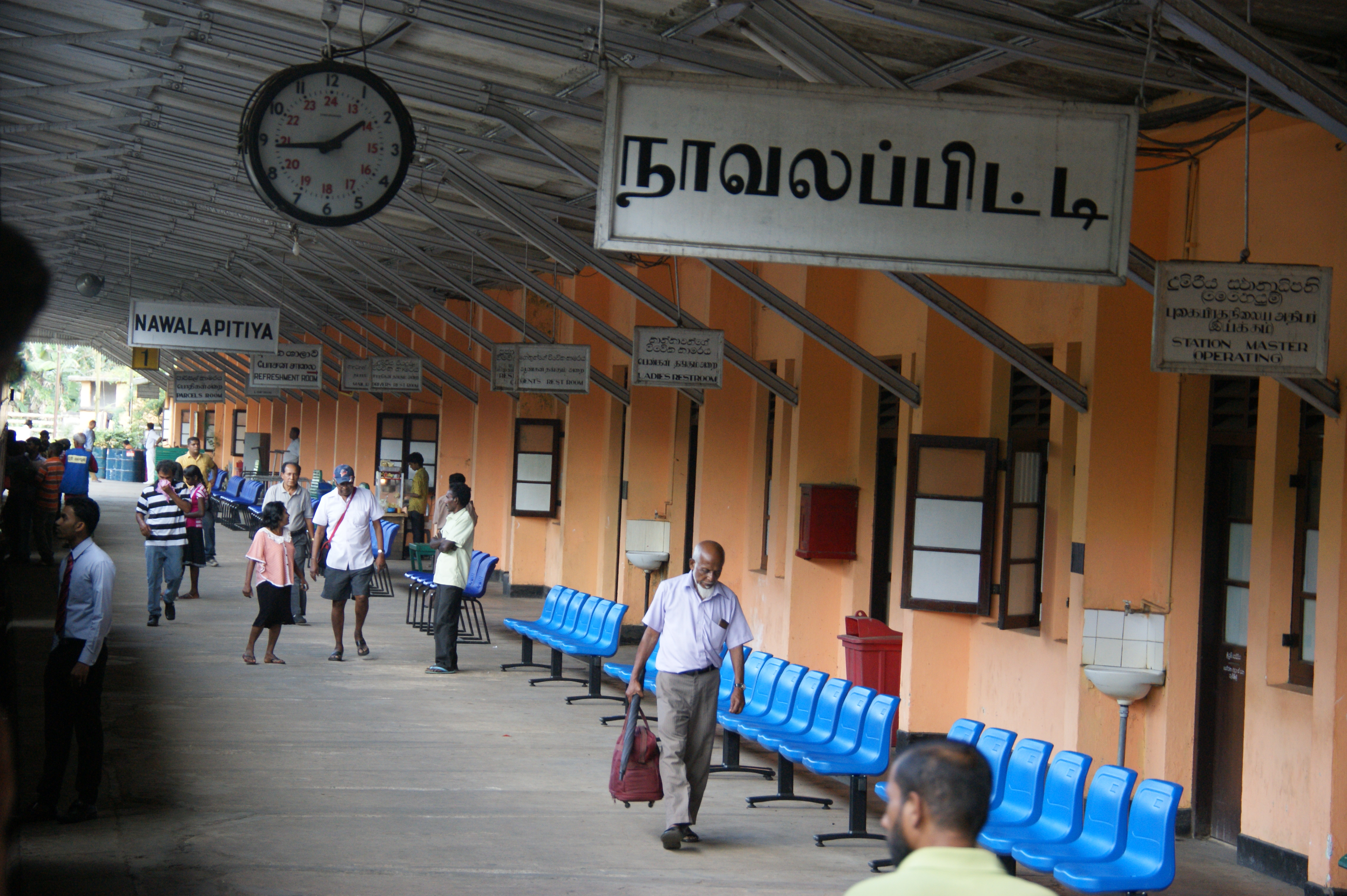
- Nawalapitiya railway station

- Location within Sri Lanka
- Coordinates: 7°03′N 80°32′E
- Country: Sri Lanka
- Province: Central Province
- District: Kandy District
- Division: Pasbage Korale Division

Government
  - Body: Nawalapitiya Urban Council

Area
  - Total: 122 km^{2} (47 sq mi)
  - Density: 491.1/km^{2} (1,272/sq mi)
- Time zone: UTC+5:30 (Sri Lanka Standard Time Zone)

Nawalapitiya (Sinhala: නාවලපිටිය, Tamil: நாவலப்பிட்டி, romanized: Nāvalappiṭṭi) is a town in Kandy District, Central Province, Sri Lanka. It is governed by the Nawalapitiya Urban Council. It is located 36 km (22 mi) from Kandy, on the banks of the Mahaweli River. The area was developed as tea and coffee production center during the British colonial rule.

== History ==
According to Ambagamuwa inscriptions in Sellipiya, Nawalapitiya served as a rest stop for pilgrims traveling to Sri Pada. The pilgrims used to bath in the Mahaweli River and the place was called as "Naana Wala Pitiya", which later became "Nawalapitiya".

Nawalapitiya developed as an agricultural settlement during the British colonial period, following the expansion of coffee and tea plantations. The Main Line of Sri Lankan Railways was extended from Colombo to Nawalapitya in 1874, and the Nawalapitiya railway station was opened in 1894. The Nawalapitiya Town Council was established on 1 January 1933, and the town was declared an Urban Development Area on 4 August 1980 under Gazette Notification No. 100/4.

== Geography and administration ==
Nawalapitiya is situated in Kandy District, in the Central Province of Sri Lanka. It is located approximately 36 km (22 mi) from Kandy, along the A13 highway. The town is administered by the Nawalapitiya Urban Council and is part of the Pasbage Korale Divisional Secretariat. The Mahaweli River forms part of its eastern and southern boundaries, while the Dolosbage mountain range lies to the west.

Nawalapitiya is located at an altitude of 589 m (1,932 ft). It lies within Sri Lanka's wet zone and receives an average annual precipitation of 400 to 500 cm (160 to 200 in), mostly from the southwest monsoon. The maximum temperature ranges between 27.9 to 32 °C (82.2 to 89.6 °F) and the average temperature ranges between 22 to 25 °C (72 to 77 °F).

== Demographics ==
According to the 2024 census, the Nawalapitiya Urban Council area had a population of 14,192 inhabitants, comprising 6,715 males and 7,477 females. Sinhalese (34%), Sri Lankan Moors (33%), and Sri Lankan Tamils (30%) formed the majority of the ethnic composition of the Nawalapitiya planning area.Former Tamil Nadu chief minister M. G. Ramachandran was born at Nawalapitiya.

== See also ==
- Maha Oya Pumped Storage Power Station
