= Degaldoruwa Raja Maha Vihara =

Buddhist rock temple in Sri Lanka

- දෙගල්දෝරුව රජමහා විහාරය
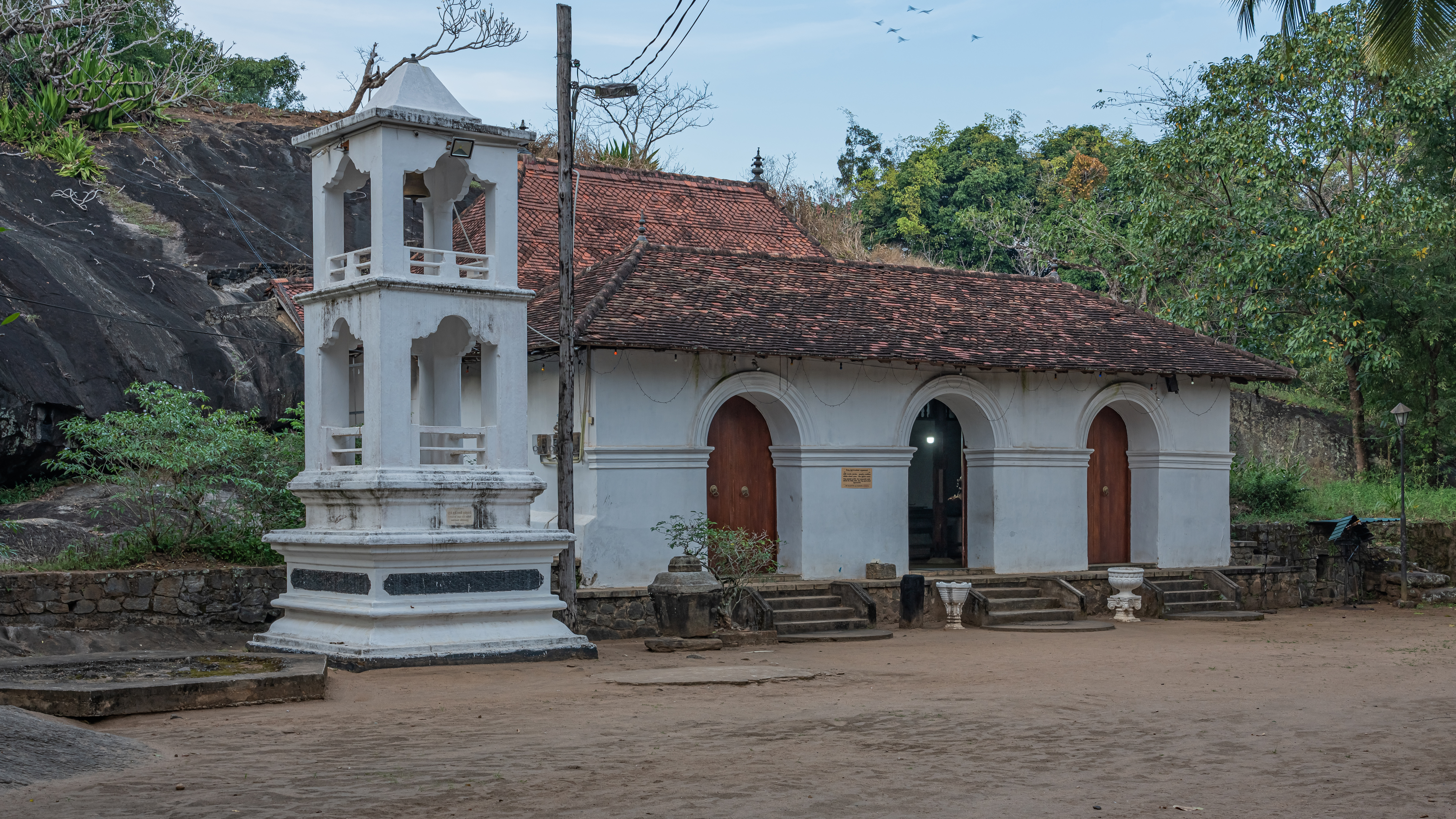

Religion
- Affiliation: Buddhism
- District: Kandy
- Province: Central Province

Location
- Location: Kandy, Sri Lanka
- Interactive map of Degaldoruwa Raja Maha Vihara
- Coordinates: 07°18′16″N 80°39′50″E

Architecture
- Type: Buddhist Temple
- Founder: King Rajadhi Rajasinha
- Completed: 1771 AD
- Archaeological Protected Monument of Sri Lanka
- Designated: 22 May 1964

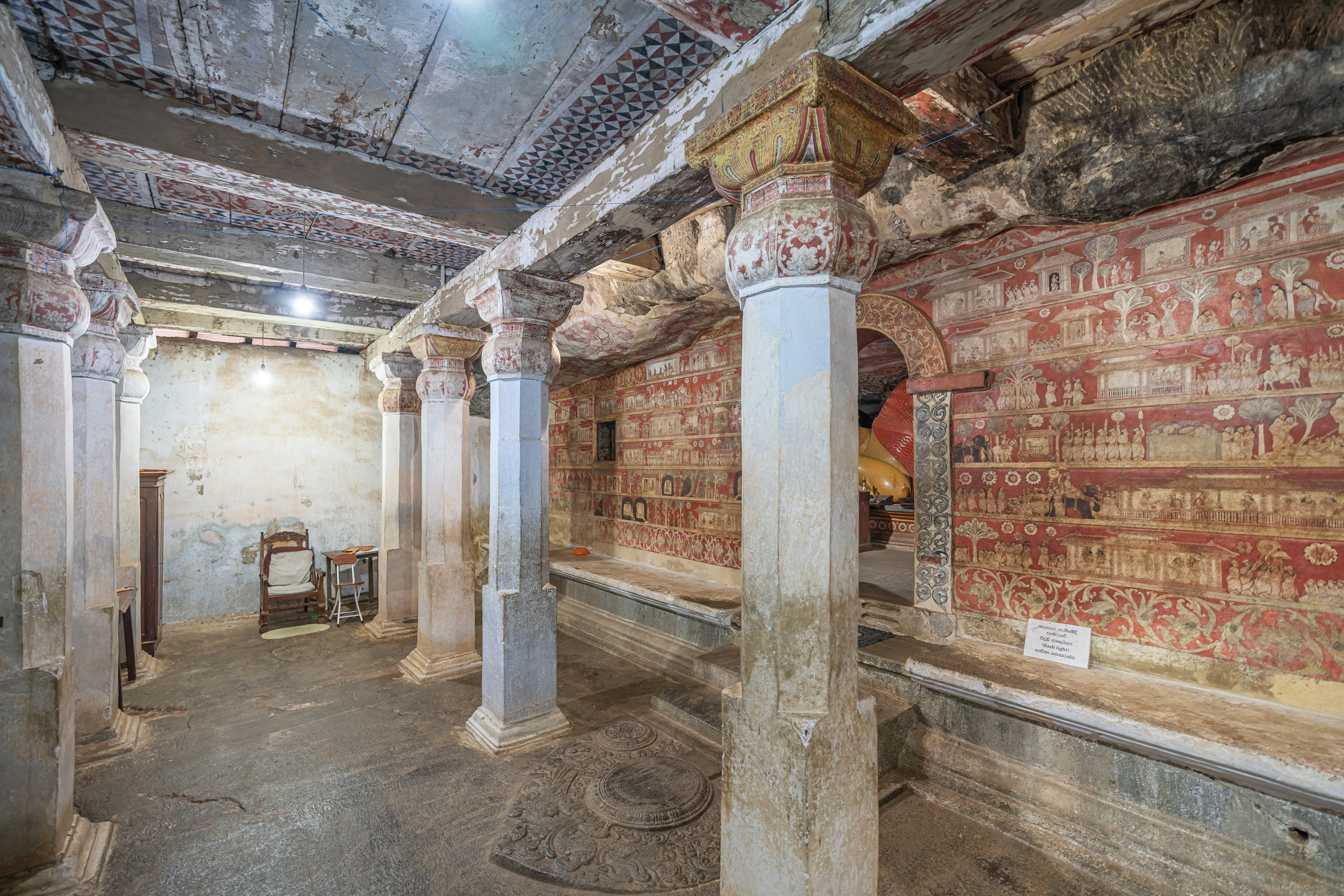
Interior

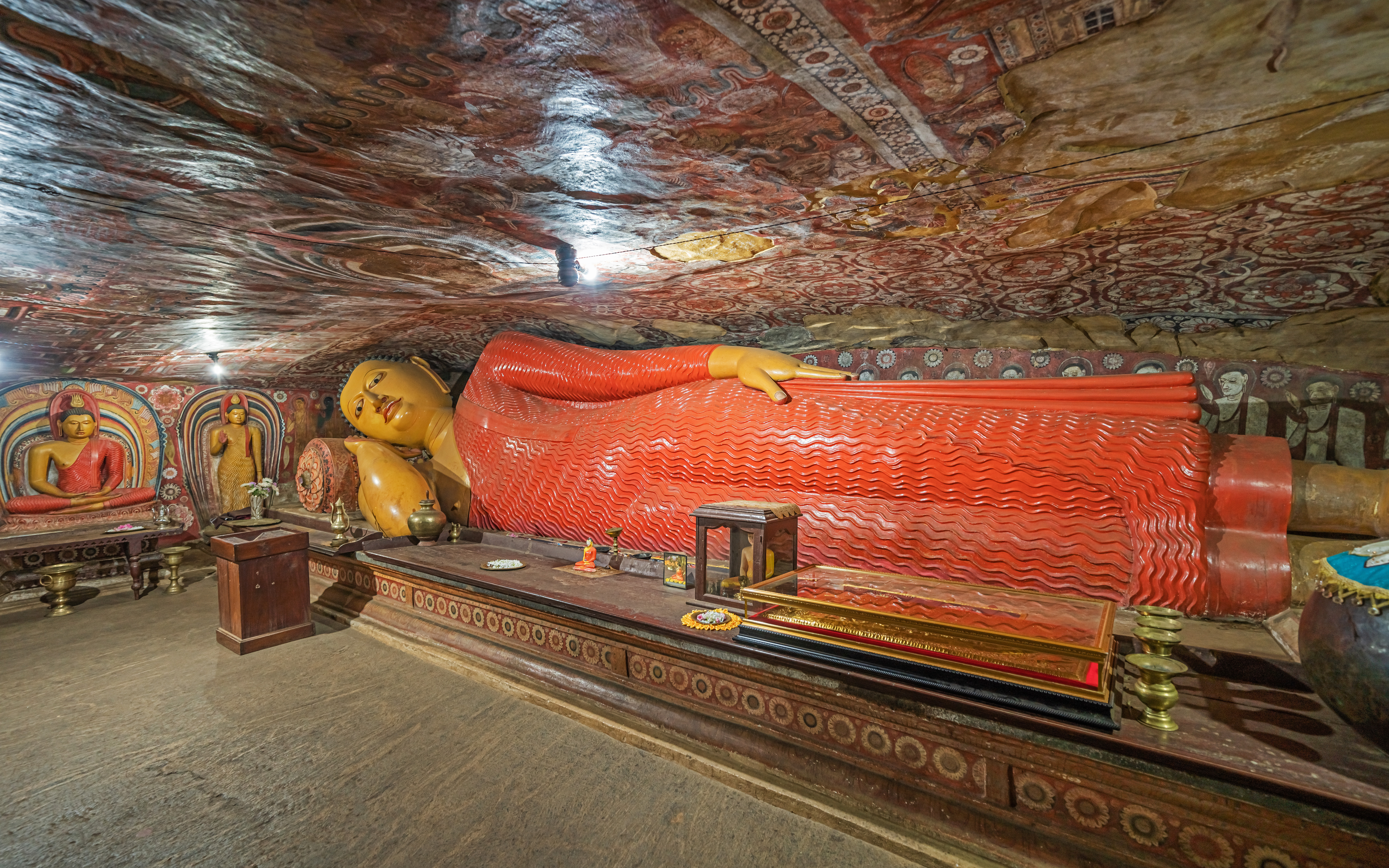
Reclining Buddha statue

Degaldoruwa Raja Maha Vihara (Sinhala: දෙගල්දෝරුව රජමහා විහාරය) is a Buddhist rock temple in Amunugama, Sri Lanka. It is famous for its Kandyan Era Frescoes. The cave itself was said to have been excavated out of a rock which rises to a height of approximately 12.3 m (40 ft) and shelters the shrine room and entrance chamber.

Details of the temple's construction and the royal land grant are contained on the Degaldoruwa Tamba Sannasa (Copper Plate). Construction began in 1771 during the reign of King Kirti Sri Rajasinha [1747-1782 AD] by his younger brother, Rajadhi Rajasinha and was completed by Rajasinha after he ascended to the throne. Following its completion, Rajasinha placed it in the custody of a learned monk, Moratota Dhammakkanda Maha Nayaka Thera [1734-1811], who was also Rajasinha's teacher and chief advisor.

== History ==
According to local folklore, the temple's origins relate to a time when a farmer investigated a gap between two large boulders near his village and discovered a pile of golden sickles. He used one of the sickles to harvest his crops, replacing it in the evening when he returned home. He continued to do this every morning, each time returning the sickle at the end of the day.

On the final day of harvesting, the farmer took two sickles, and in the evening, replaced only one of them. On discovering that one of the sickles was missing, the treasure's guardian confronted the farmer and demanded he return it immediately. The terrified farmer ran back to his fields, recovered the sickle, and placed it back in the gap between the boulders. The guardian then sealed the opening by fusing the boulders.

The other members of the village became aware of this event and informed King Kirti Sri Rajasinha, who instructed them to clear the cave and erect a temple there.

== Structures ==
The temple is hollowed out of a large 12.3 m (40 ft) rock outcrop and consists of an elegant rock shelter with two roofed ante chambers in front, the first one a drumming hall and the second an image house, both of which are constructed outside the rock outcrop and topped by wooden roofs, whilst the third chamber, the main shrine room, is cut into the rock itself.

Drumming hall

The drumming hall (or digge) is unusual in that it is directly attached to the rest of the temple, rather than occupying a separate pavilion as is typically found in most similar temples.

Image house

The image house (Budu-ge) is accessed through a set of old wooden doors beneath a carved wooden Makara Torana (Dragon Arch), which leads into the antechamber. This chamber preserves a moonstone and features a series of five vivid panels depicting scenes from four Jātaka tales -Vessantara Jātaka, Sattubhatta Jātaka, Sutasoma Jātaka and Mahaseelava Jātaka that recount episodes from the Buddha’s previous 550 lives in both human and animal form.

Shrine room

The doors leading from here into the main shrine have metal fittings which were formerly studded with jewels. The principal image is a large reclining Buddha; the wall opposite the reclining Buddha is painted with scenes from the previous birth of Buddha together with pictures of stupas at Sri Lanka's principal pilgrimage sites.

Murals

Four ‘Sittara’ artists are credited with painting the Degaldoruwa murals, Nilagama Patabanda (the chief layman of Balavatvala), Devaragampola Silvatänna (an unordained monk, who also painted murals at Ridi Viharaya), Kosvatte Hiriyale Naide and Devendra Mulachari. The finest painting is on the ceiling, ‘Mara Yudde’, an artistic depiction of Buddha's internal spiritual battle against Māra, the demon of death, rebirth and desire. The murals are unique in that all the various elements – the people, the trees and the animals are a uniform size and it is only the front view of individual people that is shown, not the rear view. The trees are painted in a stylised form, with their branches and leaves spreading out to each side. The individual elements are portrayed in great detail, such as the adornments on the elephants and the uniforms of the attendants. All of the colours used by the artists in the murals were sourced from the bark of nearby trees.

== See also ==
- List of Archaeological Protected Monuments in Sri Lanka
