= Galhinna =

- Village
- Location within Sri Lanka
- Coordinates: 07°24′58.11″N 80°34′07.83″E
- Country: Sri Lanka
- Province: Central Province
- District: Kandy District
- Divisional Secretariat: Poojapitiya Divisional Secretariat
- Established: 1880
- Elevation: 675 m (2,215 ft)

Population
  - Estimate (2014): 18,507
- Time zone: UTC+5:30 (Sri Lanka Standard Time Zone)
- Postal Code: 20152

Galhinna (Sinhala: ගල්හින්න, pronounced [ɡalˈhinnə]; Tamil: கல்ஹின்னை, pronounced [ɡalˈhinnaɪ]) is a village situated in the Kandy District, Central Province, Sri Lanka. It is administered by the Pujapitiya divisional secretariat. The town is located nearly 3 kilometres (2 mi) away from the town of Ankumbura and is surrounded by the villages of Ramakotuwa, Udagama, Bulugaha Ela, Welgala, Galkanada, Medilla, Alawatta, Bebilagolla, Kovila Muduna, Kandekumbera. It is located 22 kilometres (14 mi) north-west of the Kandy, at an altitude of 675 metres (2,215 ft) above sea level and is one of the highest points in Kandy.

== Etymology ==
The name Galhinna is derived from the Sinhalese "gal" and "hena", meaning "stone fence". The name refers to the area's rocky landscapes.

== History ==
The general area of Galhinna is surrounded by range of mountains and is mainly by tea plantations and rubber estates. It has a rich history and holds an important place in business education. The area is thought to have been inhabited from as early as the 19th century AD.

Galhinna is home to Al Manar National School, Galhinna, established in 1934. This public school provides secondary education for approximately 1,000 pupils.

The Galhinna Grand Mosque is another important place in the village. The grand mosque in the village is one of the oldest in Sri Lanka. Next to it is the Islamic Madrasa named Jamiathul Faththah Arabic College, which has been one of the wealthiest Islamic institutions in Sri Lanka for the past two centuries. The village has several small mosques and a few Buddhist temples in the surrounding areas. Another girls' Islamic Madrasa is located at Thaqwa Gardens in Galhinna named Dharuth Thaqwa Girls Arabic College, officially started on 23 January 2008. The first batch has passed out in 2012.

== Demographics ==
Galhinna has an estimated population of 18,507. The majority of the people living in Galhinna are Muslims surrounded mostly by Sinhala villages. Tamil is the major language spoken in Galhinna by the majority of the population. The other languages spoken are Sinhala and English. Galhinna is a cold village and it is frequently covered with fog during noon time.

== See also ==
- Ankumbura
- Ankumbura Pallegama
- Ankumbura Udagama
- List of towns in Central Province, Sri Lanka
