= Delthota Divisional Secretariat =

- Divisional Secretariat
- Interactive map of Delthota Divisional Secretariat
- Country: Sri Lanka
- Province: Central Province
- District: Kandy District

Area
  - Total: 49 km^{2} (19 sq mi)

Population (2024)
  - Total: 31,904
  - Density: 651/km^{2} (1,690/sq mi)
- Time zone: UTC+5:30 (Sri Lanka Standard Time)

Delthota Divisional Secretariat is a Divisional Secretariat of Kandy District, of Central Province, Sri Lanka.

Religion in Delthota DS Division (2012)
1. Buddhist (39.9%)
2. Hindu (33.2%)
3. Muslim (25.1%)
4. Roman Catholic (0.68%)
5. Other Christian (1.08%)
6. Other (0.02%)
