= Azhar College =

Azhar Central College

Location
- Kandy-Jaffna Highway; 7th Milepost; Akurana; Kandy; Sri Lanka
- 7.3733°N 80.6197°E

Information
- School type: Government Funding
- Motto: Knowledge is Bliss
- Established: 17 May 1907
- School district: Kandy
- Principal: M. F. M. Siraj
- Grades: 6 to 13
- Gender: Coed
- Age: 6 to 19
- Enrollment: 3,000+
- Education system: National Secondary Education Curriculum of Ministry of Education (Sri Lanka)
- Language: English and Tamil
- Colours: Maroon, yellow and blue
- Sports: Cricket, Basketball
- Mascot: The Crescent
- Nickname: ACAK
- Newspaper: Azhar News
- Former pupils: Old Azharians

Azhar Central College is a Muslim school established in 1907 in Akurana in the Kandy District of Central Province, Sri Lanka. It is a government-funded school based on national secondary education system of the Curriculum of Ministry of Education (Sri Lanka). The school is one of the leading Muslim educational institutions in Sri Lanka, with a student population of more than 3,000. Azhar Central College has classes starting from grade 1 to Advanced level classes in both English and Tamil medium. Azhar Central College celebrated its centenary in the year 2007 with grand festivities.

Azhar is the only Muslim school in the country to play national level basketball and has clinched the national title. The Azhar-Madeenian big match is played every year between Azhar Central College and Madeena Central College - Madawela and is the only big cricket big match played between two Muslim schools.

== School chronology ==
- 1907 Establishment of the school at the 7th mile post in Akurana
- 17 May 2007 Centenary year celebration of the school

== Old Azharians ==
=== The Old Azharians Union (OAU) ===
The College Old Boys Association (OBA) was officially transformed to the Old Azharians Union (OAU) on 14 April 2002.

=== The Junior Azharians Union (JAU) ===
The history of Junior Azharians Union (JAU) can be traced back to the beginning of millennium-year 2000, when a group of senior students of the college realised the need of a stronger gathering of students and as well as the past students in the development of the school.
