= Ankumbura Udagama =

Coordinates: 7°25′N 80°34′E

Ankumbura Udagama අංකුඹුර උඩගම
- Village
- Interactive map of Ankumbura Udagama
- Country: Sri Lanka
- Province: Central Province
- District: Kandy District

Population (2024)
  - Total: 732
- Time zone: UTC+5:30 (Sri Lanka Standard Time)

Ankumbura Udagama (Sinhala: අංකුඹුර උඩගම) is a village in Sri Lanka. It is located within Central Province.

== See also ==
- Ankumbura
- Ankumbura Pallegama
- Galhinna
- List of towns in Central Province, Sri Lanka
