= Amunugama (surname) =

Amunugama (Sinhala: අමුණුගම, romanized: Amuṇugama) is a Sinhalese surname. Notable people with the surname include:

- Dilum Amunugama, Sri Lankan politician
- Rajitha Amunugama (born 1969), Sri Lankan cricketer
- Sarath Amunugama, Sri Lankan academic
- Sarath Amunugama (born 1939), Sri Lankan politician and civil servant

== See also ==
- Amunugama, Sri Lanka, a village
