= Nithulethenna =

Coordinates: 7°18′N 80°42′E

- Village
- Interactive map of Nithulethenna
- Country: Sri Lanka
- Province: Central Province
- Time zone: UTC+5:30 (Sri Lanka Standard Time)

Nithulethenna is a village and Grama Niladhari division in Sri Lanka with GN division location code 2-1-27-295-01. It is located within Kundasale Divisional Secretariat, Central Province.

== See also ==
- List of towns in Central Province, Sri Lanka
