= Ambatenna =

- Village
- Location within Sri Lanka
- Coordinates: 7°21′12″N 80°36′51″E
- Country: Sri Lanka
- Province: Central Province
- Time zone: UTC+5:30 (Sri Lanka Standard Time)

Ambatenna is a village in Sri Lanka. It is located in Central Province's Kandy District.

== See also ==
- List of towns in Central Province, Sri Lanka
