= Welamboda =

Coordinates: 7°12′N 80°33′E

Welamboda වේලම්බොඩ
- Village
- Interactive map of Welamboda
- Country: Sri Lanka
- Province: Central Province
- District: Kandy
- Time zone: UTC+5:30 (Sri Lanka Standard Time)
- Postal code: 20640

Welamboda (වෙල්ලම්බොඩ) is a village in Sri Lanka. It is located within Central Province.

== See also ==
- List of towns in Central Province, Sri Lanka
