= Alawatugoda =

Alawathugoda අලවතුගොඩ
- Village
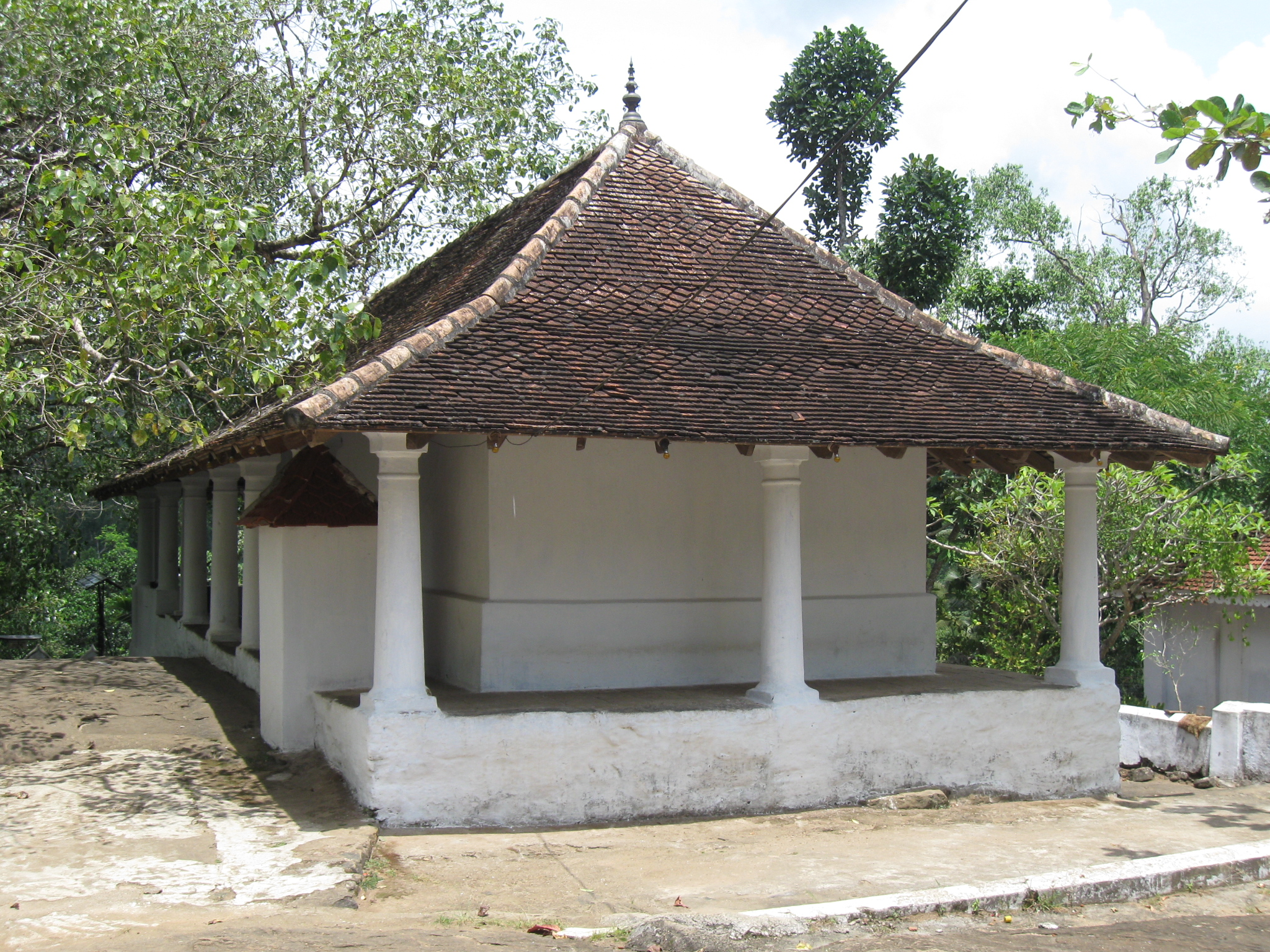
- Alawathugoda Saman Devalaya in Alawatugoda

- Location within Sri Lanka Location within India
- Coordinates: 7°24′10″N 80°36′37″E
- Country: Sri Lanka
- Province: Central Province
- District: Kandy District
- Divisional secretariat: Akurana Divisional Secretariat
- Time zone: UTC+5:30 (Sri Lanka Standard Time)

Alawathugoda (Sinhala: අලවතුගොඩ) is a village in Sri Lanka.

It lies 14 km (9 mi) north of Kandy, on the road to Matale, in Kandy District of Central Province.

== History ==
A toll station once stood where the road to Kurunegala joins the main road. A resthouse once also stood, the building then becoming a government-operated school. The school recorded 68 boys and 1 girl in 1887, with 74 students in 1893.

Former arachchies of the village include Herat Mudiyanse Kalu Banda (1855), Mudiyanselage Punchirala (1862), Ekanekege Ukku Banda (1863), Harasgama Walawwe Tikiri Banda (1867), Herat Mudiyanselage Kiri Banda (1872), Mawatupola Welege Punchirala (1882), Herat Mudiyanselage Ukku Banda (1882), and Wijekon Mudiyanselage Kalugalage Kirala (1888).

== Alawatugoda Dewale ==
A Buddhist dewale sits in Alawatugoda, standing on a mass of bare granite rising a few feet above the surrounding land. It was a place of sanctity during Kandyan times. Tradition states that the temple possessed a Sannas from King Walgambahu that was lost in the Rebellion of 1818. Close to the dewale was a vihara; both were burned by a party of English soldiers from Trincomalee, only the dewale having been rebuilt. A bo-tree growing from a hollow in a rock below the dewale is said to conceal the entrance to a "potgula", or cave, where sacred books are buried. Others claim the spot as the original site of the vihara, and as of the writing of Archibald Campbell Lawrie's 1896 gazetteer of the province, plans were made by worshippers to build a daboga at the site.

== Demographics ==
Historical population
Year	Pop.	±%
1881	661	—
1891	352	−46.7%

== See also ==
- List of towns in Central Province, Sri Lanka
