= Udadumbara =

Coordinates: 7°21′N 80°50′E

Udadumbara Madugoda
- Village
- Interactive map of Udadumbara
- Country: Sri Lanka
- Province: Central Province
- Elevation: 2,430 ft (740 m)
- Time zone: UTC+5:30 (Sri Lanka Standard Time)
- Postal code: 20950

Udadumbara is a small town in Sri Lanka, located within Kandy District, Central Province.

The area was previously known as Madugoda. Elevation is 740m from the sea level. Distance to Udadumbara from Kandy is 45km and from Colombo is 185km.

== See also ==
- List of towns in Central Province, Sri Lanka
