= Akurana Divisional Secretariat =

Coordinates: 7.3928°N 80.6178°E

- Divisional Secretariat
- Interactive map of Akurana Divisional Secretariat
- Country: Sri Lanka
- Province: Central Province
- District: Kandy District

Area
  - Total: 31 km^{2} (12 sq mi)

Population (2024)
  - Total: 71,010
  - Density: 2,290.57/km^{2} (5,932.5/sq mi)
- Time zone: UTC+5:30 (Sri Lanka Standard Time)

Akurana Divisional Secretariat is a Divisional Secretariat of Kandy District, of Central Province, Sri Lanka.

== Demography-Religion ==
Religion in Akurana DS Division (2012)
1. Buddhist (29.6%)
2. Hindu (5.10%)
3. Muslim (64.9%)
4. Roman Catholic (0.40%)
5. Other Christian (0.10%)
6. Other (0.00%)
