= Panvila Divisional Secretariat =

- Divisional Secretariat
- Interactive map of Panvila Divisional Secretariat
- Country: Sri Lanka
- Province: Central Province
- District: Kandy District
- Time zone: UTC+5:30 (Sri Lanka Standard Time)

Panvila Divisional Secretariat is a Divisional Secretariat of Kandy District, of Central Province, Sri Lanka.

Religion in Panvila DS Division (2012)
1. Buddhist (37.9%)
2. Hindu (52.2%)
3. Muslim (4.21%)
4. Roman Catholic (3.42%)
5. Other Christian (2.30%)
6. Other (0.01%)
