= Ankumbura =

Coordinates: 7°26′N 80°34′E

Ankumbura අංකුඹුර
- Village
- Interactive map of Ankumbura
- Country: Sri Lanka
- Province: Central Province
- District: Kandy District
- Time zone: UTC+5:30 (Sri Lanka Standard Time)

Ankumbura (Sinhala: අංකුඹුර) is a village in Sri Lanka. It lies within Central Province's Kandy district. It is about 26 km away from Kandy. It has been bounded by Matale and Kurunegala districts. It is connected to Kandy via Pujapitiya and Ambathenna. Alawathugoda road is connected to Matale.

== See also ==
- Ankumbura Udagama
- Ankumbura Pallegama
- Galhinna
- List of towns in Central Province, Sri Lanka
