= Minipe Divisional Secretariat =

- Divisional Secretariat
- Country: Sri Lanka
- Province: Central Province
- District: Kandy District

Government
  - Divisional Secretary: Chamila Wijerathna

Area
  - Total: 250 km^{2} (97 sq mi)

Population (2012)
  - Total: 51,883
  - Density: 207.5/km^{2} (537/sq mi)
- Time zone: UTC+5:30 (Sri Lanka Standard Time)

Minipe Divisional Secretariat is a Divisional Secretariat of Kandy District, of Central Province, Sri Lanka.

== Demography-Religion ==
Religion in Minipe DS Division (2012)
1. Buddhist (99.1%)
2. Hindu (0.10%)
3. Muslim (0.60%)
4. Roman Catholic (0.10%)
5. Other Christian (0.10%)
6. Other (0.00%)
