= Dunuwila =

- Village
- Location within Sri Lanka
- Coordinates: 7°15′0″N 80°49′0″E
- Country: Sri Lanka
- Province: Central Province
- Time zone: UTC+5:30 (Sri Lanka Standard Time)

Dunuwila is a village in Central Provinces, Sri Lanka. It is located 15 km north of Kandy & 147 km east of Colombo. Situated near Wasgamuwa National Park, the village has a Hindu Religious Significance Rama killed Ravana with this bow, hitting him with Brahmastra, the death-arrow here & presently the site is said to be Dunuwila Lake. As the story signifies, the name of the village meaning in Sinhala language is 'Dunu' means bow and 'Wila' means lake.

== Etymology ==
The meaning of Dunuwila in Sinhala language is 'Dunu' means bow and 'Wila' means lake. It means the 'Lake of Bow'. According to Valmiki Ramayan, this was the site of Rama-Ravan War & Ravana was killed by Rama's bow, hitting him with Brahmastra, the death-arrow on his navel. This Ramayana association is a mythological legend which has no historical basis.

== Location ==
Dunuwila is a small village in Central Provinces, 15 km north of Kandy near Wasgamuwa National Park. The Village can be reached by road from Kandy.

== See also ==
- List of towns in Central Province, Sri Lanka
