= Pasbage Korale Divisional Secretariat =

- Divisional Secretariat
- Country: Sri Lanka
- Province: Central Province
- District: Kandy District
- Time zone: UTC+5:30 (Sri Lanka Standard Time)

Pasbage Korale Divisional Secretariat is a Divisional Secretariat of Kandy District, of Central Province, Sri Lanka.

== Demography-Religion ==
Religion in Pasbage Korale DS Division (2012)
1. Buddhist (46.6%)
2. Hindu (31.8%)
3. Muslim (15.2%)
4. Roman Catholic (4.20%)
5. Other Christian (2.20%)
6. Other (0.00%)
