= Pathadumbara Polling Division =

Pathadumbara
- Polling Division
- Coordinates: 7.375718°N 80.694795°E
- Country: Sri Lanka
- Province: Central Province, Sri Lanka
- Electoral District: Kandy Electoral District

Area
  - Total: 139.16 km^{2} (53.73 sq mi)

Population (2012)
  - Total: 115,019
  - Density: 827/km^{2} (2,140/sq mi)
- ISO 3166 code: EC-04C

The Pathadumbara Polling Division is a Polling Division in the Kandy Electoral District, in the Central Province, Sri Lanka.

== Presidential Election Results ==
=== Summary ===
The winner of Pathadumbara has matched the final country result 6 out of 8 times. Hence, Pathadumbara is a Weak Bellwether for Presidential Elections.

Year	Pathadumbara	Kandy Electoral District	MAE %	Sri Lanka	MAE %
2019	NDF	SLPP	5.29%	SLPP	7.33%
2015	NDF	NDF	3.25%	NDF	6.53%
2010	UPFA	UPFA	4.27%	UPFA	7.93%
2005	UNP	UNP	5.51%	UPFA	11.41%
1999	PA	PA	11.83%	PA	10.29%
1994	PA	PA	3.91%	PA	9.49%
1988	UNP	UNP	2.30%	UNP	5.20%
1982	UNP	UNP	3.40%	UNP	7.85%
Matches/Mean MAE	6/8	7/8	4.97%	8/8	8.25%

=== 2019 Sri Lankan Presidential Election ===
Party	Pathadumbara		Kandy Electoral District		Sri Lanka	
Party	Votes	%	Votes	%	Votes	%
NDF	35,848	50.20%	417,355	44.64%	5,564,239	41.99%
SLPP	32,057	44.89%	471,502	50.43%	6,924,255	52.25%
Other Parties (with < 1%)	2,070	2.90%	22,479	2.40%	345,452	2.61%
NMPP	1,439	2.02%	23,539	2.52%	418,553	3.16%
Valid Votes	71,414	99.05%	934,875	99.04%	13,252,499	98.99%
Rejected Votes	684	0.95%	9,020	0.96%	135,452	1.01%
Total Polled	72,098	83.50%	943,895	84.89%	13,387,951	83.71%
Registered Electors	86,342		1,111,860		15,992,568	

=== 2015 Sri Lankan Presidential Election ===
Party	Pathadumbara		Kandy Electoral District		Sri Lanka	
Party	Votes	%	Votes	%	Votes	%
NDF	37,840	57.79%	466,994	54.56%	6,217,162	51.28%
UPFA	26,762	40.87%	378,585	44.23%	5,768,090	47.58%
Other Parties (with < 1%)	878	1.34%	10,329	1.21%	138,200	1.14%
Valid Votes	65,480	98.46%	855,908	98.73%	12,123,452	98.85%
Rejected Votes	1,023	1.54%	10,993	1.27%	140,925	1.15%
Total Polled	66,503	77.90%	866,901	79.71%	12,264,377	78.69%
Registered Electors	85,375		1,087,542		15,585,942	

=== 2010 Sri Lankan Presidential Election ===
Party	Pathadumbara		Kandy Electoral District		Sri Lanka	
Party	Votes	%	Votes	%	Votes	%
UPFA	28,628	49.61%	406,636	54.16%	6,015,934	57.88%
NDF	27,692	47.99%	329,492	43.89%	4,173,185	40.15%
Other Parties (with < 1%)	1,383	2.40%	14,658	1.95%	204,494	1.97%
Valid Votes	57,703	98.57%	750,786	98.85%	10,393,613	99.03%
Rejected Votes	838	1.43%	8,700	1.15%	101,838	0.97%
Total Polled	58,541	74.40%	759,486	75.87%	10,495,451	66.70%
Registered Electors	78,688		1,001,074		15,734,587	

=== 2005 Sri Lankan Presidential Election ===
Party	Pathadumbara		Kandy Electoral District		Sri Lanka	
Party	Votes	%	Votes	%	Votes	%
UNP	31,957	59.81%	387,150	54.33%	4,706,366	48.43%
UPFA	20,610	38.57%	315,672	44.30%	4,887,152	50.29%
Other Parties (with < 1%)	866	1.62%	9,798	1.37%	123,521	1.27%
Valid Votes	53,433	98.37%	712,620	98.64%	9,717,039	98.88%
Rejected Votes	885	1.63%	9,817	1.36%	109,869	1.12%
Total Polled	54,318	75.63%	722,437	77.37%	9,826,908	69.51%
Registered Electors	71,823		933,754		14,136,979	

=== 1999 Sri Lankan Presidential Election ===
Party	Pathadumbara		Kandy Electoral District		Sri Lanka	
Party	Votes	%	Votes	%	Votes	%
PA	32,945	63.25%	308,187	50.29%	4,312,157	51.12%
UNP	17,372	33.35%	276,360	45.10%	3,602,748	42.71%
JVP	928	1.78%	15,512	2.53%	343,927	4.08%
Other Parties (with < 1%)	846	1.62%	12,752	2.08%	176,679	2.09%
Valid Votes	52,091	97.50%	612,811	97.29%	8,435,754	97.69%
Rejected Votes	1,338	2.50%	17,060	2.71%	199,536	2.31%
Total Polled	53,429	84.73%	629,871	77.61%	8,635,290	72.17%
Registered Electors	63,055		811,606		11,965,536	

=== 1994 Sri Lankan Presidential Election ===
Party	Pathadumbara		Kandy Electoral District		Sri Lanka	
Party	Votes	%	Votes	%	Votes	%
PA	23,082	52.61%	320,110	56.64%	4,709,205	62.28%
UNP	19,995	45.57%	235,519	41.68%	2,715,283	35.91%
Other Parties (with < 1%)	800	1.82%	9,488	1.68%	137,040	1.81%
Valid Votes	43,877	96.37%	565,117	97.55%	7,561,526	98.03%
Rejected Votes	1,652	3.63%	14,179	2.45%	151,706	1.97%
Total Polled	45,529	79.21%	579,296	77.85%	7,713,232	69.12%
Registered Electors	57,482		744,151		11,158,880	

=== 1988 Sri Lankan Presidential Election ===
Party	Pathadumbara		Kandy Electoral District		Sri Lanka	
Party	Votes	%	Votes	%	Votes	%
UNP	20,902	57.19%	234,124	54.88%	2,569,199	50.43%
SLFP	15,087	41.28%	186,187	43.65%	2,289,857	44.95%
SLMP	557	1.52%	6,266	1.47%	235,701	4.63%
Valid Votes	36,546	98.36%	426,577	98.57%	5,094,754	98.24%
Rejected Votes	611	1.64%	6,167	1.43%	91,499	1.76%
Total Polled	37,157	76.23%	432,744	68.36%	5,186,256	55.87%
Registered Electors	48,741		633,030		9,283,143	

=== 1982 Sri Lankan Presidential Election ===
Party	Pathadumbara		Kandy Electoral District		Sri Lanka	
Party	Votes	%	Votes	%	Votes	%
UNP	22,158	63.56%	289,621	59.80%	3,450,815	52.93%
SLFP	11,783	33.80%	178,647	36.89%	2,546,348	39.05%
JVP	669	1.92%	12,493	2.58%	273,428	4.19%
Other Parties (with < 1%)	252	0.72%	3,536	0.73%	249,460	3.83%
Valid Votes	34,862	98.92%	484,297	99.07%	6,520,156	98.78%
Rejected Votes	382	1.08%	4,548	0.93%	80,470	1.22%
Total Polled	35,244	84.14%	488,845	89.44%	6,600,626	80.15%
Registered Electors	41,888		546,565		8,235,358	

== Parliamentary Election Results ==
=== Summary ===
The winner of Pathadumbara has matched the final country result 4 out of 7 times. Hence, Pathadumbara is a Weak Bellwether for Parliamentary Elections.

Year	Pathadumbara	Kandy Electoral District	MAE %	Sri Lanka	MAE %
2015	UNP	UNP	3.89%	UNP	9.67%
2010	UPFA	UPFA	3.70%	UPFA	4.80%
2004	UNP	UNP	6.99%	UPFA	12.28%
2001	PA	UNP	6.70%	UNP	4.46%
2000	PA	PA	7.70%	PA	8.30%
1994	UNP	UNP	5.72%	PA	10.28%
1989	UNP	UNP	3.69%	UNP	8.97%
Matches/Mean MAE	4/7	5/7	5.48%	7/7	8.39%

=== 2015 Sri Lankan Parliamentary Election ===
Party	Pathadumbara		Kandy Electoral District		Sri Lanka	
Party	Votes	%	Votes	%	Votes	%
UNP	35,619	59.61%	440,761	55.61%	5,098,916	45.77%
UPFA	20,822	34.85%	309,152	39.00%	4,732,664	42.48%
JVP	1,779	2.98%	30,669	3.87%	544,154	4.88%
CWC	944	1.58%	4,400	0.56%	17,107	0.15%
Other Parties (with < 1%)	591	0.99%	7,655	0.97%	82,981	0.74%
Valid Votes	59,755	94.56%	792,637	95.48%	11,140,333	95.35%
Rejected Votes	3,406	5.39%	37,065	4.46%	516,926	4.42%
Total Polled	63,195	74.02%	830,165	79.13%	11,684,111	77.66%
Registered Electors	85,375		1,049,160		15,044,490	

=== 2010 Sri Lankan Parliamentary Election ===
Party	Pathadumbara		Kandy Electoral District		Sri Lanka	
Party	Votes	%	Votes	%	Votes	%
UPFA	23,956	57.15%	339,819	60.81%	4,846,388	60.38%
UNP	16,214	38.68%	192,798	34.50%	2,357,057	29.37%
DNA	1,477	3.52%	23,728	4.25%	441,251	5.50%
Other Parties (with < 1%)	271	0.65%	2,459	0.44%	30,354	0.38%
Valid Votes	41,918	88.95%	558,804	90.49%	8,026,322	96.03%
Rejected Votes	5,177	10.99%	58,333	9.45%	581,465	6.96%
Total Polled	47,127	59.89%	617,559	61.70%	8,358,246	59.29%
Registered Electors	78,688		1,000,861		14,097,690	

=== 2004 Sri Lankan Parliamentary Election ===
Party	Pathadumbara		Kandy Electoral District		Sri Lanka	
Party	Votes	%	Votes	%	Votes	%
UNP	26,230	57.60%	313,859	49.99%	3,486,792	37.73%
UPFA	16,071	35.29%	268,131	42.71%	4,223,126	45.70%
JHU	2,946	6.47%	42,192	6.72%	552,723	5.98%
Other Parties (with < 1%)	289	0.63%	3,684	0.59%	64,227	0.69%
Valid Votes	45,536	91.46%	627,866	93.24%	9,241,931	94.52%
Rejected Votes	4,250	8.54%	45,484	6.75%	534,452	5.47%
Total Polled	49,786	71.58%	673,380	76.47%	9,777,821	75.74%
Registered Electors	69,554		880,634		12,909,631	

=== 2001 Sri Lankan Parliamentary Election ===
Party	Pathadumbara		Kandy Electoral District		Sri Lanka	
Party	Votes	%	Votes	%	Votes	%
PA	19,911	47.35%	233,637	39.23%	3,330,815	37.19%
UNP	19,461	46.28%	314,297	52.77%	4,086,026	45.62%
JVP	2,071	4.92%	37,146	6.24%	815,353	9.10%
Other Parties (with < 1%)	609	1.45%	10,496	1.76%	129,347	1.44%
Valid Votes	42,052	93.20%	595,576	93.40%	8,955,844	94.77%
Rejected Votes	3,069	6.80%	42,103	6.60%	494,009	5.23%
Total Polled	45,121	67.02%	637,679	76.03%	9,449,878	76.03%
Registered Electors	67,327		838,687		12,428,762	

=== 2000 Sri Lankan Parliamentary Election ===
Party	Pathadumbara		Kandy Electoral District		Sri Lanka	
Party	Votes	%	Votes	%	Votes	%
PA	24,235	55.16%	282,282	46.66%	3,899,329	45.33%
UNP	13,805	31.42%	243,623	40.27%	3,451,765	40.12%
NUA	3,277	7.46%	32,023	5.29%	185,593	2.16%
JVP	1,016	2.31%	21,565	3.56%	518,725	6.03%
Other Parties (with < 1%)	630	1.43%	8,328	1.38%	138,824	1.61%
SU	521	1.19%	10,999	1.82%	127,859	1.49%
CWC	454	1.03%	6,108	1.01%	22,985	0.27%
Valid Votes	43,938	N/A	604,928	N/A	8,602,617	N/A

=== 1994 Sri Lankan Parliamentary Election ===
Party	Pathadumbara		Kandy Electoral District		Sri Lanka	
Party	Votes	%	Votes	%	Votes	%
UNP	25,471	58.21%	301,824	52.35%	3,498,370	44.04%
PA	17,816	40.72%	267,683	46.43%	3,887,805	48.94%
Other Parties (with < 1%)	467	1.07%	7,045	1.22%	175,576	2.21%
Valid Votes	43,754	94.12%	576,552	94.89%	7,943,688	95.20%
Rejected Votes	2,731	5.88%	31,019	5.11%	400,395	4.80%
Total Polled	46,485	80.87%	607,571	81.67%	8,344,095	74.75%
Registered Electors	57,482		743,939		11,163,064	

=== 1989 Sri Lankan Parliamentary Election ===
Party	Pathadumbara		Kandy Electoral District		Sri Lanka	
Party	Votes	%	Votes	%	Votes	%
UNP	17,031	64.76%	204,973	61.72%	2,838,005	50.71%
SLFP	6,979	26.54%	105,977	31.91%	1,785,369	31.90%
SLMC	1,740	6.62%	14,697	4.43%	202,016	3.61%
USA	476	1.81%	5,147	1.55%	141,983	2.54%
Other Parties (with < 1%)	73	0.28%	1,315	0.40%	67,723	1.21%
Valid Votes	26,299	93.27%	332,109	93.69%	5,596,468	93.87%
Rejected Votes	1,897	6.73%	22,374	6.31%	365,563	6.13%
Total Polled	28,196	59.10%	354,483	56.42%	5,962,031	63.60%
Registered Electors	47,713		628,317		9,374,164	

== Demographics ==
=== Ethnicity ===
The Pathadumbara Polling Division has a Sinhalese majority (66.0%), a significant Moor population (18.3%) and a significant Indian Tamil population (11.8%) . In comparison, the Kandy Electoral District (which contains the Pathadumbara Polling Division) has a Sinhalese majority (74.4%) and a significant Moor population (13.9%)

Ethnicity in Pathadumbara
1. Sinhalese (66.0%)
2. Moor (18.3%)
3. Indian Tamil (11.8%)
4. Sri Lankan Tamil (3.60%)
5. Other (0.30%)

=== Religion ===
The Pathadumbara Polling Division has a Buddhist majority (65.2%), a significant Muslim population (18.6%) and a significant Hindu population (13.8%) . In comparison, the Kandy Electoral District (which contains the Pathadumbara Polling Division) has a Buddhist majority (73.4%) and a significant Muslim population (14.3%)

Religion in Pathadumbara
1. Buddhist (65.2%)
2. Muslim (18.6%)
3. Hindu (13.8%)
4. Roman Catholic (1.70%)
5. Other (0.80%)
