= Yakgahapitiya =

Coordinates: 7°18′N 80°40′E

- Village
- Interactive map of Yakgahapitiya
- Country: Sri Lanka
- Province: Central Province
- Time zone: UTC+5:30 (Sri Lanka Standard Time)

Yakgahapitiya is a village in Sri Lanka. It is located within Kandy, Central Province. Degaldoruwa temple and the Sirimalwatta Ambalama are the popular places in this village.

== See also ==
- List of towns in Central Province, Sri Lanka
