= Hewaheta Polling Division =

Hewaheta
- Polling Division
- Coordinates: 7.229480°N 80.704046°E
- Country: Sri Lanka
- Province: Central Province, Sri Lanka
- Electoral District: Kandy Electoral District

Area
  - Total: 83.14 km^{2} (32.10 sq mi)

Population (2012)
  - Total: 58,188
  - Density: 700/km^{2} (1,800/sq mi)
- ISO 3166 code: EC-04G

The Hewaheta Polling Division is a Polling Division in the Kandy Electoral District, in the Central Province, Sri Lanka.

== Presidential Election Results ==
=== Summary ===
The winner of Hewaheta has matched the final country result 6 out of 8 times. Hence, Hewaheta is a Weak Bellwether for Presidential Elections.

Year	Hewaheta	Kandy Electoral District	MAE %	Sri Lanka	MAE %
2019	NDF	SLPP	3.50%	SLPP	5.54%
2015	NDF	NDF	1.51%	NDF	1.78%
2010	UPFA	UPFA	2.20%	UPFA	5.88%
2005	UNP	UNP	2.40%	UPFA	8.29%
1999	PA	PA	2.37%	PA	3.84%
1994	PA	PA	5.77%	PA	11.34%
1988	UNP	UNP	2.73%	UNP	5.62%
1982	UNP	UNP	0.81%	UNP	5.32%
Matches/Mean MAE	6/8	7/8	2.66%	8/8	5.95%

=== 2019 Sri Lankan Presidential Election ===
Party	Hewaheta		Kandy Electoral District		Sri Lanka	
Party	Votes	%	Votes	%	Votes	%
NDF	28,166	48.80%	417,355	44.64%	5,564,239	41.99%
SLPP	27,263	47.24%	471,502	50.43%	6,924,255	52.25%
Other Parties (with < 1%)	1,496	2.59%	22,479	2.40%	345,452	2.61%
NMPP	791	1.37%	23,539	2.52%	418,553	3.16%
Valid Votes	57,716	98.93%	934,875	99.04%	13,252,499	98.99%
Rejected Votes	627	1.07%	9,020	0.96%	135,452	1.01%
Total Polled	58,343	84.25%	943,895	84.89%	13,387,951	83.71%
Registered Electors	69,251		1,111,860		15,992,568	

=== 2015 Sri Lankan Presidential Election ===
Party	Hewaheta		Kandy Electoral District		Sri Lanka	
Party	Votes	%	Votes	%	Votes	%
NDF	28,049	52.84%	466,994	54.56%	6,217,162	51.28%
UPFA	24,167	45.53%	378,585	44.23%	5,768,090	47.58%
Other Parties (with < 1%)	863	1.63%	10,329	1.21%	138,200	1.14%
Valid Votes	53,079	98.75%	855,908	98.73%	12,123,452	98.85%
Rejected Votes	673	1.25%	10,993	1.27%	140,925	1.15%
Total Polled	53,752	77.63%	866,901	79.71%	12,264,377	78.69%
Registered Electors	69,243		1,087,542		15,585,942	

=== 2010 Sri Lankan Presidential Election ===
Party	Hewaheta		Kandy Electoral District		Sri Lanka	
Party	Votes	%	Votes	%	Votes	%
UPFA	24,601	51.55%	406,636	54.16%	6,015,934	57.88%
NDF	21,791	45.66%	329,492	43.89%	4,173,185	40.15%
Other Parties (with < 1%)	1,329	2.78%	14,658	1.95%	204,494	1.97%
Valid Votes	47,721	98.61%	750,786	98.85%	10,393,613	99.03%
Rejected Votes	674	1.39%	8,700	1.15%	101,838	0.97%
Total Polled	48,395	74.25%	759,486	75.87%	10,495,451	66.70%
Registered Electors	65,176		1,001,074		15,734,587	

=== 2005 Sri Lankan Presidential Election ===
Party	Hewaheta		Kandy Electoral District		Sri Lanka	
Party	Votes	%	Votes	%	Votes	%
UNP	25,874	56.66%	387,150	54.33%	4,706,366	48.43%
UPFA	19,058	41.74%	315,672	44.30%	4,887,152	50.29%
Other Parties (with < 1%)	732	1.60%	9,798	1.37%	123,521	1.27%
Valid Votes	45,664	98.58%	712,620	98.64%	9,717,039	98.88%
Rejected Votes	660	1.42%	9,817	1.36%	109,869	1.12%
Total Polled	46,324	75.93%	722,437	77.37%	9,826,908	69.51%
Registered Electors	61,006		933,754		14,136,979	

=== 1999 Sri Lankan Presidential Election ===
Party	Hewaheta		Kandy Electoral District		Sri Lanka	
Party	Votes	%	Votes	%	Votes	%
PA	19,900	48.33%	308,187	50.29%	4,312,157	51.12%
UNP	19,808	48.11%	276,360	45.10%	3,602,748	42.71%
Other Parties (with < 1%)	828	2.01%	12,752	2.08%	176,679	2.09%
JVP	638	1.55%	15,512	2.53%	343,927	4.08%
Valid Votes	41,174	97.49%	612,811	97.29%	8,435,754	97.69%
Rejected Votes	1,059	2.51%	17,060	2.71%	199,536	2.31%
Total Polled	42,233	76.54%	629,871	77.61%	8,635,290	72.17%
Registered Electors	55,180		811,606		11,965,536	

=== 1994 Sri Lankan Presidential Election ===
Party	Hewaheta		Kandy Electoral District		Sri Lanka	
Party	Votes	%	Votes	%	Votes	%
PA	19,303	50.80%	320,110	56.64%	4,709,205	62.28%
UNP	18,076	47.57%	235,519	41.68%	2,715,283	35.91%
Other Parties (with < 1%)	618	1.63%	9,488	1.68%	137,040	1.81%
Valid Votes	37,997	97.63%	565,117	97.55%	7,561,526	98.03%
Rejected Votes	921	2.37%	14,179	2.45%	151,706	1.97%
Total Polled	38,918	77.26%	579,296	77.85%	7,713,232	69.12%
Registered Electors	50,376		744,151		11,158,880	

=== 1988 Sri Lankan Presidential Election ===
Party	Hewaheta		Kandy Electoral District		Sri Lanka	
Party	Votes	%	Votes	%	Votes	%
UNP	19,688	57.90%	234,124	54.88%	2,569,199	50.43%
SLFP	14,015	41.22%	186,187	43.65%	2,289,857	44.95%
Other Parties (with < 1%)	298	0.88%	6,266	1.47%	235,701	4.63%
Valid Votes	34,001	98.91%	426,577	98.57%	5,094,754	98.24%
Rejected Votes	373	1.09%	6,167	1.43%	91,499	1.76%
Total Polled	34,374	80.19%	432,744	68.36%	5,186,256	55.87%
Registered Electors	42,868		633,030		9,283,143	

=== 1982 Sri Lankan Presidential Election ===
Party	Hewaheta		Kandy Electoral District		Sri Lanka	
Party	Votes	%	Votes	%	Votes	%
UNP	20,296	61.06%	289,621	59.80%	3,450,815	52.93%
SLFP	12,286	36.96%	178,647	36.89%	2,546,348	39.05%
JVP	419	1.26%	12,493	2.58%	273,428	4.19%
Other Parties (with < 1%)	239	0.72%	3,536	0.73%	249,460	3.83%
Valid Votes	33,240	98.77%	484,297	99.07%	6,520,156	98.78%
Rejected Votes	414	1.23%	4,548	0.93%	80,470	1.22%
Total Polled	33,654	86.41%	488,845	89.44%	6,600,626	80.15%
Registered Electors	38,947		546,565		8,235,358	

== Parliamentary Election Results ==
=== Summary ===
The winner of Hewaheta has matched the final country result 5 out of 7 times. Hence, Hewaheta is a Weak Bellwether for Parliamentary Elections.

Year	Hewaheta	Kandy Electoral District	MAE %	Sri Lanka	MAE %
2015	UNP	UNP	2.28%	UNP	8.09%
2010	UPFA	UPFA	1.81%	UPFA	2.98%
2004	UNP	UNP	4.38%	UPFA	9.62%
2001	UNP	UNP	1.42%	UNP	5.63%
2000	PA	PA	1.35%	PA	2.14%
1994	UNP	UNP	5.97%	PA	10.49%
1989	UNP	UNP	1.95%	UNP	7.20%
Matches/Mean MAE	5/7	5/7	2.74%	7/7	6.59%

=== 2015 Sri Lankan Parliamentary Election ===
Party	Hewaheta		Kandy Electoral District		Sri Lanka	
Party	Votes	%	Votes	%	Votes	%
UNP	28,115	58.59%	440,761	55.61%	5,098,916	45.77%
UPFA	18,029	37.57%	309,152	39.00%	4,732,664	42.48%
JVP	1,059	2.21%	30,669	3.87%	544,154	4.88%
Other Parties (with < 1%)	780	1.63%	12,055	1.52%	100,088	0.90%
Valid Votes	47,983	94.23%	792,637	95.48%	11,140,333	95.35%
Rejected Votes	2,903	5.70%	37,065	4.46%	516,926	4.42%
Total Polled	50,919	73.54%	830,165	79.13%	11,684,111	77.66%
Registered Electors	69,243		1,049,160		15,044,490	

=== 2010 Sri Lankan Parliamentary Election ===
Party	Hewaheta		Kandy Electoral District		Sri Lanka	
Party	Votes	%	Votes	%	Votes	%
UPFA	20,848	59.81%	339,819	60.81%	4,846,388	60.38%
UNP	13,145	37.71%	192,798	34.50%	2,357,057	29.37%
DNA	736	2.11%	23,728	4.25%	441,251	5.50%
Other Parties (with < 1%)	126	0.36%	2,459	0.44%	30,354	0.38%
Valid Votes	34,855	87.91%	558,804	90.49%	8,026,322	96.03%
Rejected Votes	4,763	12.01%	58,333	9.45%	581,465	6.96%
Total Polled	39,649	60.83%	617,559	61.70%	8,358,246	59.29%
Registered Electors	65,176		1,000,861		14,097,690	

=== 2004 Sri Lankan Parliamentary Election ===
Party	Hewaheta		Kandy Electoral District		Sri Lanka	
Party	Votes	%	Votes	%	Votes	%
UNP	22,724	56.11%	313,859	49.99%	3,486,792	37.73%
UPFA	16,277	40.19%	268,131	42.71%	4,223,126	45.70%
JHU	1,253	3.09%	42,192	6.72%	552,723	5.98%
Other Parties (with < 1%)	246	0.61%	3,684	0.59%	64,227	0.69%
Valid Votes	40,500	92.21%	627,866	93.24%	9,241,931	94.52%
Rejected Votes	3,423	7.79%	45,484	6.75%	534,452	5.47%
Total Polled	43,923	73.38%	673,380	76.47%	9,777,821	75.74%
Registered Electors	59,853		880,634		12,909,631	

=== 2001 Sri Lankan Parliamentary Election ===
Party	Hewaheta		Kandy Electoral District		Sri Lanka	
Party	Votes	%	Votes	%	Votes	%
UNP	14,055	54.47%	314,297	52.77%	4,086,026	45.62%
PA	10,371	40.19%	233,637	39.23%	3,330,815	37.19%
JVP	996	3.86%	37,146	6.24%	815,353	9.10%
Other Parties (with < 1%)	382	1.48%	10,496	1.76%	129,347	1.44%
Valid Votes	25,804	92.05%	595,576	93.40%	8,955,844	94.77%
Rejected Votes	2,230	7.95%	42,103	6.60%	494,009	5.23%
Total Polled	28,034	48.46%	637,679	76.03%	9,449,878	76.03%
Registered Electors	57,850		838,687		12,428,762	

=== 2000 Sri Lankan Parliamentary Election ===
Party	Hewaheta		Kandy Electoral District		Sri Lanka	
Party	Votes	%	Votes	%	Votes	%
PA	18,695	48.26%	282,282	46.66%	3,899,329	45.33%
UNP	16,021	41.35%	243,623	40.27%	3,451,765	40.12%
NUA	1,564	4.04%	32,023	5.29%	185,593	2.16%
CWC	1,053	2.72%	6,108	1.01%	22,985	0.27%
Other Parties (with < 1%)	736	1.90%	19,327	3.19%	266,683	3.10%
JVP	673	1.74%	21,565	3.56%	518,725	6.03%
Valid Votes	38,742	N/A	604,928	N/A	8,602,617	N/A

=== 1994 Sri Lankan Parliamentary Election ===
Party	Hewaheta		Kandy Electoral District		Sri Lanka	
Party	Votes	%	Votes	%	Votes	%
UNP	22,141	58.68%	301,824	52.35%	3,498,370	44.04%
PA	15,365	40.72%	267,683	46.43%	3,887,805	48.94%
Other Parties (with < 1%)	228	0.60%	7,045	1.22%	175,576	2.21%
Valid Votes	37,734	93.53%	576,552	94.89%	7,943,688	95.20%
Rejected Votes	2,611	6.47%	31,019	5.11%	400,395	4.80%
Total Polled	40,345	80.09%	607,571	81.67%	8,344,095	74.75%
Registered Electors	50,376		743,939		11,163,064	

=== 1989 Sri Lankan Parliamentary Election ===
Party	Hewaheta		Kandy Electoral District		Sri Lanka	
Party	Votes	%	Votes	%	Votes	%
UNP	20,917	64.69%	204,973	61.72%	2,838,005	50.71%
SLFP	10,307	31.88%	105,977	31.91%	1,785,369	31.90%
SLMC	800	2.47%	14,697	4.43%	202,016	3.61%
Other Parties (with < 1%)	311	0.96%	6,462	1.95%	209,706	3.75%
Valid Votes	32,335	94.11%	332,109	93.69%	5,596,468	93.87%
Rejected Votes	2,025	5.89%	22,374	6.31%	365,563	6.13%
Total Polled	34,360	81.46%	354,483	56.42%	5,962,031	63.60%
Registered Electors	42,178		628,317		9,374,164	

== Demographics ==
=== Ethnicity ===
The Hewaheta Polling Division has a Sinhalese majority (90.1%) . In comparison, the Kandy Electoral District (which contains the Hewaheta Polling Division) has a Sinhalese majority (74.4%) and a significant Moor population (13.9%)

Ethnicity in Hewaheta
1. Sinhalese (90.1%)
2. Sri Lankan Tamil (5.20%)
3. Moor (2.30%)
4. Indian Tamil (2.10%)
5. Other (0.20%)

=== Religion ===
The Hewaheta Polling Division has a Buddhist majority (89.5%) . In comparison, the Kandy Electoral District (which contains the Hewaheta Polling Division) has a Buddhist majority (73.4%) and a significant Muslim population (14.3%)

Religion in Hewaheta
1. Buddhist (89.5%)
2. Hindu (6.20%)
3. Muslim (2.40%)
4. Roman Catholic (1.10%)
5. Other (0.80%)
