= Weligalla =

- Village
- Country: Sri Lanka
- Province: Central Province
- Time zone: UTC+5:30 (Sri Lanka Standard Time)

Weligalla is a town situated beside Kandy-Gampola main road in Sri Lanka. It is located within Central Province.

== See also ==
- List of towns in Central Province, Sri Lanka
