= Pathahewaheta Divisional Secretariat =

- Divisional Secretariat
- Interactive map of Pathahewaheta Divisional Secretariat
- Country: Sri Lanka
- Province: Central Province
- District: Kandy District

Area
  - Total: 84 km^{2} (32 sq mi)

Population (2024)
  - Total: 60,639
  - Density: 722/km^{2} (1,870/sq mi)
- Time zone: UTC+5:30 (Sri Lanka Standard Time)

Pathahewaheta Divisional Secretariat is a Divisional Secretariat of Kandy District, of Central Province, Sri Lanka.

== Demography-Religion ==
Religion in Pathahewaheta DS Division (2012)
1. Buddhist (89.5%)
2. Hindu (6.20%)
3. Muslim (2.40%)
4. Roman Catholic (1.10%)
5. Other Christian (0.80%)
6. Other (0.00%)
