= Kundasale Polling Division =

Kundasale
- Polling Division
- Coordinates: 7.319743°N 80.702858°E
- Country: Sri Lanka
- Province: Central Province, Sri Lanka
- Electoral District: Kandy Electoral District

Area
  - Total: 79.12 km^{2} (30.55 sq mi)

Population (2012)
  - Total: 127,070
  - Density: 1,606/km^{2} (4,160/sq mi)
- ISO 3166 code: EC-04F

The Kundasale Polling Division is a Polling Division in the Kandy Electoral District, in the Central Province, Sri Lanka.

== Presidential Election Results ==
=== Summary ===
The winner of Kundasale has matched the final country result 7 out of 8 times. Hence, Kundasale is a Strong Bellwether for Presidential Elections.

Year	Kundasale	Kandy Electoral District	MAE %	Sri Lanka	MAE %
2019	SLPP	SLPP	3.38%	SLPP	1.27%
2015	NDF	NDF	0.39%	NDF	3.66%
2010	UPFA	UPFA	1.28%	UPFA	2.35%
2005	UNP	UNP	1.66%	UPFA	4.19%
1999	PA	PA	2.23%	PA	3.66%
1994	PA	PA	0.63%	PA	6.21%
1988	UNP	UNP	0.05%	UNP	2.95%
1982	UNP	UNP	0.72%	UNP	3.96%
Matches/Mean MAE	7/8	7/8	1.29%	8/8	3.53%

=== 2019 Sri Lankan Presidential Election ===
Party	Kundasale		Kandy Electoral District		Sri Lanka	
Party	Votes	%	Votes	%	Votes	%
SLPP	43,788	53.81%	471,502	50.43%	6,924,255	52.25%
NDF	33,293	40.92%	417,355	44.64%	5,564,239	41.99%
NMPP	2,539	3.12%	23,539	2.52%	418,553	3.16%
Other Parties (with < 1%)	1,750	2.15%	22,479	2.40%	345,452	2.61%
Valid Votes	81,370	99.15%	934,875	99.04%	13,252,499	98.99%
Rejected Votes	700	0.85%	9,020	0.96%	135,452	1.01%
Total Polled	82,070	84.34%	943,895	84.89%	13,387,951	83.71%
Registered Electors	97,309		1,111,860		15,992,568	

=== 2015 Sri Lankan Presidential Election ===
Party	Kundasale		Kandy Electoral District		Sri Lanka	
Party	Votes	%	Votes	%	Votes	%
NDF	41,238	55.06%	466,994	54.56%	6,217,162	51.28%
UPFA	32,930	43.97%	378,585	44.23%	5,768,090	47.58%
Other Parties (with < 1%)	722	0.96%	10,329	1.21%	138,200	1.14%
Valid Votes	74,890	98.95%	855,908	98.73%	12,123,452	98.85%
Rejected Votes	794	1.05%	10,993	1.27%	140,925	1.15%
Total Polled	75,684	79.78%	866,901	79.71%	12,264,377	78.69%
Registered Electors	94,870		1,087,542		15,585,942	

=== 2010 Sri Lankan Presidential Election ===
Party	Kundasale		Kandy Electoral District		Sri Lanka	
Party	Votes	%	Votes	%	Votes	%
UPFA	36,212	55.66%	406,636	54.16%	6,015,934	57.88%
NDF	27,852	42.81%	329,492	43.89%	4,173,185	40.15%
Other Parties (with < 1%)	996	1.53%	14,658	1.95%	204,494	1.97%
Valid Votes	65,060	99.00%	750,786	98.85%	10,393,613	99.03%
Rejected Votes	656	1.00%	8,700	1.15%	101,838	0.97%
Total Polled	65,716	76.54%	759,486	75.87%	10,495,451	66.70%
Registered Electors	85,857		1,001,074		15,734,587	

=== 2005 Sri Lankan Presidential Election ===
Party	Kundasale		Kandy Electoral District		Sri Lanka	
Party	Votes	%	Votes	%	Votes	%
UNP	31,321	52.75%	387,150	54.33%	4,706,366	48.43%
UPFA	27,385	46.12%	315,672	44.30%	4,887,152	50.29%
Other Parties (with < 1%)	666	1.12%	9,798	1.37%	123,521	1.27%
Valid Votes	59,372	98.76%	712,620	98.64%	9,717,039	98.88%
Rejected Votes	746	1.24%	9,817	1.36%	109,869	1.12%
Total Polled	60,118	78.06%	722,437	77.37%	9,826,908	69.51%
Registered Electors	77,020		933,754		14,136,979	

=== 1999 Sri Lankan Presidential Election ===
Party	Kundasale		Kandy Electoral District		Sri Lanka	
Party	Votes	%	Votes	%	Votes	%
PA	23,259	47.80%	308,187	50.29%	4,312,157	51.12%
UNP	22,974	47.22%	276,360	45.10%	3,602,748	42.71%
JVP	1,569	3.22%	15,512	2.53%	343,927	4.08%
Other Parties (with < 1%)	852	1.75%	12,752	2.08%	176,679	2.09%
Valid Votes	48,654	97.17%	612,811	97.29%	8,435,754	97.69%
Rejected Votes	1,415	2.83%	17,060	2.71%	199,536	2.31%
Total Polled	50,069	76.66%	629,871	77.61%	8,635,290	72.17%
Registered Electors	65,317		811,606		11,965,536	

=== 1994 Sri Lankan Presidential Election ===
Party	Kundasale		Kandy Electoral District		Sri Lanka	
Party	Votes	%	Votes	%	Votes	%
PA	24,150	55.98%	320,110	56.64%	4,709,205	62.28%
UNP	18,243	42.29%	235,519	41.68%	2,715,283	35.91%
Other Parties (with < 1%)	747	1.73%	9,488	1.68%	137,040	1.81%
Valid Votes	43,140	97.56%	565,117	97.55%	7,561,526	98.03%
Rejected Votes	1,081	2.44%	14,179	2.45%	151,706	1.97%
Total Polled	44,221	77.68%	579,296	77.85%	7,713,232	69.12%
Registered Electors	56,925		744,151		11,158,880	

=== 1988 Sri Lankan Presidential Election ===
Party	Kundasale		Kandy Electoral District		Sri Lanka	
Party	Votes	%	Votes	%	Votes	%
UNP	15,231	54.82%	234,124	54.88%	2,569,199	50.43%
SLFP	12,118	43.62%	186,187	43.65%	2,289,857	44.95%
SLMP	433	1.56%	6,266	1.47%	235,701	4.63%
Valid Votes	27,782	98.56%	426,577	98.57%	5,094,754	98.24%
Rejected Votes	407	1.44%	6,167	1.43%	91,499	1.76%
Total Polled	28,189	57.72%	432,744	68.36%	5,186,256	55.87%
Registered Electors	48,841		633,030		9,283,143	

=== 1982 Sri Lankan Presidential Election ===
Party	Kundasale		Kandy Electoral District		Sri Lanka	
Party	Votes	%	Votes	%	Votes	%
UNP	20,421	58.78%	289,621	59.80%	3,450,815	52.93%
SLFP	12,898	37.12%	178,647	36.89%	2,546,348	39.05%
JVP	1,138	3.28%	12,493	2.58%	273,428	4.19%
Other Parties (with < 1%)	286	0.82%	3,536	0.73%	249,460	3.83%
Valid Votes	34,743	98.99%	484,297	99.07%	6,520,156	98.78%
Rejected Votes	355	1.01%	4,548	0.93%	80,470	1.22%
Total Polled	35,098	84.95%	488,845	89.44%	6,600,626	80.15%
Registered Electors	41,314		546,565		8,235,358	

== Parliamentary Election Results ==
=== Summary ===
The winner of Kundasale has matched the final country result 4 out of 7 times. Hence, Kundasale is a Weak Bellwether for Parliamentary Elections.

Year	Kundasale	Kandy Electoral District	MAE %	Sri Lanka	MAE %
2015	UNP	UNP	0.51%	UNP	5.59%
2010	UPFA	UPFA	2.65%	UPFA	3.77%
2004	UNP	UNP	2.66%	UPFA	3.76%
2001	UNP	UNP	1.07%	UNP	4.19%
2000	UNP	PA	3.14%	PA	2.42%
1994	UNP	UNP	0.71%	PA	4.26%
1989	UNP	UNP	2.85%	UNP	8.17%
Matches/Mean MAE	4/7	5/7	1.94%	7/7	4.59%

=== 2015 Sri Lankan Parliamentary Election ===
Party	Kundasale		Kandy Electoral District		Sri Lanka	
Party	Votes	%	Votes	%	Votes	%
UNP	37,355	54.83%	440,761	55.61%	5,098,916	45.77%
UPFA	26,637	39.10%	309,152	39.00%	4,732,664	42.48%
JVP	3,250	4.77%	30,669	3.87%	544,154	4.88%
Other Parties (with < 1%)	892	1.31%	12,055	1.52%	100,088	0.90%
Valid Votes	68,134	96.15%	792,637	95.48%	11,140,333	95.35%
Rejected Votes	2,695	3.80%	37,065	4.46%	516,926	4.42%
Total Polled	70,865	74.70%	830,165	79.13%	11,684,111	77.66%
Registered Electors	94,870		1,049,160		15,044,490	

=== 2010 Sri Lankan Parliamentary Election ===
Party	Kundasale		Kandy Electoral District		Sri Lanka	
Party	Votes	%	Votes	%	Votes	%
UPFA	26,070	57.32%	339,819	60.81%	4,846,388	60.38%
UNP	16,282	35.80%	192,798	34.50%	2,357,057	29.37%
DNA	2,775	6.10%	23,728	4.25%	441,251	5.50%
Other Parties (with < 1%)	356	0.78%	2,459	0.44%	30,354	0.38%
Valid Votes	45,483	90.43%	558,804	90.49%	8,026,322	96.03%
Rejected Votes	4,783	9.51%	58,333	9.45%	581,465	6.96%
Total Polled	50,298	58.58%	617,559	61.70%	8,358,246	59.29%
Registered Electors	85,857		1,000,861		14,097,690	

=== 2004 Sri Lankan Parliamentary Election ===
Party	Kundasale		Kandy Electoral District		Sri Lanka	
Party	Votes	%	Votes	%	Votes	%
UNP	24,807	46.89%	313,859	49.99%	3,486,792	37.73%
UPFA	23,918	45.21%	268,131	42.71%	4,223,126	45.70%
JHU	3,896	7.36%	42,192	6.72%	552,723	5.98%
Other Parties (with < 1%)	286	0.54%	3,684	0.59%	64,227	0.69%
Valid Votes	52,907	93.62%	627,866	93.24%	9,241,931	94.52%
Rejected Votes	3,607	6.38%	45,484	6.75%	534,452	5.47%
Total Polled	56,514	75.57%	673,380	76.47%	9,777,821	75.74%
Registered Electors	74,784		880,634		12,909,631	

=== 2001 Sri Lankan Parliamentary Election ===
Party	Kundasale		Kandy Electoral District		Sri Lanka	
Party	Votes	%	Votes	%	Votes	%
UNP	26,815	53.75%	314,297	52.77%	4,086,026	45.62%
PA	18,908	37.90%	233,637	39.23%	3,330,815	37.19%
JVP	3,355	6.73%	37,146	6.24%	815,353	9.10%
Other Parties (with < 1%)	809	1.62%	10,496	1.76%	129,347	1.44%
Valid Votes	49,887	93.60%	595,576	93.40%	8,955,844	94.77%
Rejected Votes	3,413	6.40%	42,103	6.60%	494,009	5.23%
Total Polled	53,300	75.73%	637,679	76.03%	9,449,878	76.03%
Registered Electors	70,383		838,687		12,428,762	

=== 2000 Sri Lankan Parliamentary Election ===
Party	Kundasale		Kandy Electoral District		Sri Lanka	
Party	Votes	%	Votes	%	Votes	%
UNP	22,106	44.45%	243,623	40.27%	3,451,765	40.12%
PA	21,906	44.05%	282,282	46.66%	3,899,329	45.33%
JVP	2,315	4.65%	21,565	3.56%	518,725	6.03%
CWC	967	1.94%	6,108	1.01%	22,985	0.27%
SU	898	1.81%	10,999	1.82%	127,859	1.49%
NUA	883	1.78%	32,023	5.29%	185,593	2.16%
Other Parties (with < 1%)	657	1.32%	8,328	1.38%	138,824	1.61%
Valid Votes	49,732	N/A	604,928	N/A	8,602,617	N/A

=== 1994 Sri Lankan Parliamentary Election ===
Party	Kundasale		Kandy Electoral District		Sri Lanka	
Party	Votes	%	Votes	%	Votes	%
UNP	22,434	51.39%	301,824	52.35%	3,498,370	44.04%
PA	20,461	46.87%	267,683	46.43%	3,887,805	48.94%
Other Parties (with < 1%)	756	1.73%	7,045	1.22%	175,576	2.21%
Valid Votes	43,651	94.72%	576,552	94.89%	7,943,688	95.20%
Rejected Votes	2,434	5.28%	31,019	5.11%	400,395	4.80%
Total Polled	46,085	80.96%	607,571	81.67%	8,344,095	74.75%
Registered Electors	56,925		743,939		11,163,064	

=== 1989 Sri Lankan Parliamentary Election ===
Party	Kundasale		Kandy Electoral District		Sri Lanka	
Party	Votes	%	Votes	%	Votes	%
UNP	9,594	64.41%	204,973	61.72%	2,838,005	50.71%
SLFP	4,206	28.24%	105,977	31.91%	1,785,369	31.90%
SLMC	685	4.60%	14,697	4.43%	202,016	3.61%
USA	295	1.98%	5,147	1.55%	141,983	2.54%
Other Parties (with < 1%)	116	0.78%	1,315	0.40%	67,723	1.21%
Valid Votes	14,896	92.40%	332,109	93.69%	5,596,468	93.87%
Rejected Votes	1,225	7.60%	22,374	6.31%	365,563	6.13%
Total Polled	16,121	33.76%	354,483	56.42%	5,962,031	63.60%
Registered Electors	47,758		628,317		9,374,164	

== Demographics ==
=== Ethnicity ===
The Kundasale Polling Division has a Sinhalese majority (82.6%) . In comparison, the Kandy Electoral District (which contains the Kundasale Polling Division) has a Sinhalese majority (74.4%) and a significant Moor population (13.9%)

Ethnicity in Kundasale
1. Sinhalese (82.6%)
2. Sri Lankan Tamil (8.00%)
3. Moor (5.60%)
4. Indian Tamil (3.30%)
5. Other (0.50%)

=== Religion ===
The Kundasale Polling Division has a Buddhist majority (81.4%) . In comparison, the Kandy Electoral District (which contains the Kundasale Polling Division) has a Buddhist majority (73.4%) and a significant Muslim population (14.3%)

Religion in Kundasale
1. Buddhist (81.4%)
2. Hindu (9.60%)
3. Muslim (5.90%)
4. Roman Catholic (1.70%)
5. Other Christian (1.30%)
6. Other (0.00%)
