= Kundasale Divisional Secretariat =

- Divisional Secretariat
- Interactive map of Kundasale Divisional Secretariat
- Country: Sri Lanka
- Province: Central Province
- District: Kandy District

Area
  - Total: 31 sq mi (81 km^{2})

Population (2024)
  - Total: 144,383
  - Density: 4,620/sq mi (1,783/km^{2})
- Time zone: UTC+5:30 (Sri Lanka Standard Time)

Kundasale Divisional Secretariat is a Divisional Secretariat of Kandy District, of Central Province, Sri Lanka.

== Demography-Religion ==
Religion in Kundasale DS Division (2012)
1. Buddhist (81.4%)
2. Hindu (9.60%)
3. Muslim (5.90%)
4. Roman Catholic (1.70%)
5. Other Christian (1.30%)
6. Other (0.00%)
