= Kandy District =

Kandy District මහනුවර දිස්ත්‍රික්කය கண்டி மாவட்டம்
- Administrative District
- Map of Sri Lanka with Kandy District highlighted
- Coordinates: 7°15′N 80°45′E
- Country: Sri Lanka
- Province: Central Province
- Largest City: Kandy
- Large Towns: List: Gampola; Akurana; Nawalapitiya
- Divisions: List: Divisional Secretariats: 20; Grama Niladhari: 1,187

Government
  - District Secretary: Mr. Indika Udawaththa
  - Local: List: Municipal Councils: 1; Urban Councils: 3; Pradeishiya Sabhas: 17

Area
  - Administrative District: 1,940 km^{2} (750 sq mi)
  - Land: 1,917 km^{2} (740 sq mi)
  - Water: 23 km^{2} (8.9 sq mi)

Population (2024)
  - Administrative District: 1,461,895
  - Density: 762.6/km^{2} (1,975/sq mi)
  - Urban: 170,544 (12.4%)
  - Rural: 1,119,221 (81.4%)
- Time zone: UTC+05:30 (Sri Lanka)
- ISO 3166 code: LK-21
- Website: District Secretariat - Kandy

Kandy District (Sinhala: මහනුවර දිස්ත්‍රික්කය, Tamil: கண்டி மாவட்டம்) is a district of the Central Province of Sri Lanka. Its area is 1,940 km^{2} (750 sq mi).

== Administrative divisions ==
DS Division	Area (km^{2})	Population (2024 Census)	Population Density (/km^{2})
Akurana	31	71,010	2291
Delthota	49	31,904	651
Doluwa	95	52,784	556
Ganga Ihala Korale	94	59,145	629
Gagawata Korale	59	153,329	2,599
Harispattuwa	49	94,021	1,919
Hatharaliyadda	62	31,141	502
Kundasale	81	144,383	1,783
Medadumbara - Teldeniya	196	64,539	329
Minipe	250	55,342	221
Panvila	93	25,650	276
Pasbage Korale	122	65,553	537
Pathadumbara	51	93,476	1,833
Pathahewaheta	84	60,639	722
Pujapitiya	59	60,316	1,022
Thumpane	54	38,776	718
Udapalatha	94	103,181	1,098
Ududumbara	277	23,046	83
Udunuwara	68	121,018	1,780
Yatinuwara	72	112,642	1,564
Total	1,940	1,461,895	754

== Ethnic groups and religion ==
Ethnicity in Kandy District (2024)
1. Sinhala (73.7%)
2. Sri Lankan Moors (15.0%)
3. Sri Lankan Tamils (8.40%)
4. Hill Tamils (2.62%)
5. Others (0.25%)

Religion in Kandy district (2024)
Religion	Percent
Buddhism	72.75%
Islam	15.32%
Hinduism	9.89%
Catholicism	1.27%
Other Christianity	0.75%
Other or not stated	0.02%

Ethnic groups
Sinhalese	947,900	(74%)
Sri Lankan Moor	169,968	(13.27%)
Indian Tamil	103,622	(8.09%)
Sri Lankan Tamil	52,052	(4.06%)
Sri Lankan Malay	2,668	(0.21%)
Burgher	2,128	(0.17%)
Other	2,609	(0.2%)

The population of the district is 1,461,895.

Religions
Buddhism	937,001	(72.92%)
Islam	179,590	(13.98%)
Hinduism	134,438	(10.46%)
Roman Catholic	23,232	(1.81%)
Other Christian	10,330	(0.8%)
Other	437	(0.03%)

== Major cities ==
City	Population
Kandy	98,828
Gampola	38,871
Nawalapitiya	13,338
Teldeniya	13,059
Kadugannawa	12,654
Wattegama	8,157

== Suburbs of city of Kandy ==
- Peradeniya
- Katugastota
- Pallekele

== Big towns ==
- Gampola urban council
- Nawalapitiya UC

== Other towns ==
- Akurana
- Alawatugoda
- Ankumbura
- Ambatenna
- Daskara
- Daulagala
- Galagedara
- Galhinna
- Gelioya
- Hanguranketa
- Hapugastalawa
- Kadugannawa UC
- Katugastota
- Kundasale
- Madawala
- Menikdiwela
- Pilimatalawa
- Pussellawa
- Talatuoya
- Teldeniya
- Ulapane
- Watadeniya
- Wattegama UC
- Welamboda
- Weligalla
- Udadumbara
