= Yatinuwara Divisional Secretariat =

- Divisional Secretariat
- Location within Sri Lanka
- Coordinates: 7°16′57.4″N 80°32′26.2″E
- Country: Sri Lanka
- Province: Central Province
- District: Kandy District

Area
  - Total: 72 km^{2} (28 sq mi)

Population (2024)
  - Total: 112,642
  - Density: 1,780/km^{2} (4,600/sq mi)
- Time zone: UTC+5:30 (Sri Lanka Standard Time)

Yatinuwara Divisional Secretariat is a Divisional Secretariat of Kandy District, of Central Province, Sri Lanka. It is divided into Gangapalata, Medapalata, and Kandupalata Korales.

== History ==
Gangawata Korale, once a part of Yatinuwara, was later separated into an individual divisional secretariat, Kandy Four Gravets and Gangawata Korale, which contains Kandy.

== Demographics ==
Religion in Yatinuwara DS Division (2012)
1. Buddhist (88.8%)
2. Hindu (2.18%)
3. Muslim (7.28%)
4. Roman Catholic (0.97%)
5. Other Christian (0.77%)
6. Other (0.01%)

== Historic regions and settlements ==
The following settlements represent the pre-independence 'korale' subdivisions still familiar in the region, as officially registered in the 1911 Census,

=== Medapalata ===
- Dodanwala
- Gunegama
- Waturakumbura
- Dehianga
- Parakatawella
- Siyambalagoda
- Danture
- Munwatugoda
- Arambagama
- Urapola
- Embilimeegama
- Govindala
- Medagoda
- Pilimathalawa
- Ilukwatta
- Haliyadda
- Kotabogoda
- Kattota
- Udagalpitiya Kuppayama
- Udawela
- Imbulmalgama
- Giragama

=== Gangapalata ===
- Bulumulla
- Pilapitiya
- Walagama
- Suriyagoda
- Kiribathkumbura
- Owala
- Kehelwala
- Edanduwawa
- Gannoruwa
- Pelawa
- Yahalatenna
- Malgammana
- Kobbekaduwa
- Diyapalagoda
- Kahawatugoda
- Dehigama
- Mangalagama
- Gettapola
- Moladanda
- Ranawana
- Andurubebila
- Iriyagama
- Godagandeniya
- Penideniya
- Dehideniya

=== Kandupalata ===
- Yatigammana
- Pottepitiya
- Godigamuwa
- Gondeniya
- Madiligama
- Amunupure
- Deldeniya
- Ipiladana
- Ratmiwala
- Balana
- Mamudawela
- Kadawatgama
- Kadugannawa
- Kandangama
- Walgowwagoda
- Walgampaya
- Batgoda
- Waharakgoda
- Doluwa
- Kotaligoda
- Menikdiwela
- Tismada
