= Ilukwatta (Yatinuwara) Grama Niladhari Division =

Ilukwatta
- Grama Niladhari Division
- Interactive map of Ilukwatta
- Coordinates: 7.260036°N 80.545126°E
- Country: Sri Lanka
- Province: Central Province
- District: Kandy District
- Divisional Secretariat: Yatinuwara Divisional Secretariat
- Electoral District: Kandy Electoral District
- Polling Division: Yatinuwara Polling Division

Area
  - Total: 0.84 km^{2} (0.32 sq mi)
- Elevation: 536 m (1,759 ft)

Population (2012)
  - Total: 2,179
  - Density: 2,594/km^{2} (6,720/sq mi)
- ISO 3166 code: LK-2136460

Ilukwatta

Ilukwatta Grama Niladhari Division is a Grama Niladhari Division of the Yatinuwara Divisional Secretariat of Kandy District of Central Province, Sri Lanka. It has Grama Niladhari Division Code 173.

Govindala and Giragma are located within, nearby or associated with Ilukwatta.

Ilukwatta is a surrounded by the Alanduwaka, Arambegama West, Kiriwavula East, Kiriwavula West, Urapola and Pilimathalawa Grama Niladhari Divisions.

== Demographics ==
=== Ethnicity ===
The Ilukwatta Grama Niladhari Division has a Sinhalese majority (86.4%) and a significant Moor population (12.0%). In comparison, the Yatinuwara Divisional Secretariat (which contains the Ilukwatta Grama Niladhari Division) has a Sinhalese majority (89.9%)

Ethnicity in Ilukwatta
1. Sinhalese (86.4%)
2. Moor (12.0%)
3. Sri Lankan Tamil (1.00%)
4. Other (0.60%)

=== Religion ===
The Ilukwatta Grama Niladhari Division has a Buddhist majority (85.1%) and a significant Muslim population (12.6%). In comparison, the Yatinuwara Divisional Secretariat (which contains the Ilukwatta Grama Niladhari Division) has a Buddhist majority (88.8%)

Religion in Ilukwatta
1. Buddhist (85.1%)
2. Muslim (12.6%)
3. Roman Catholic (1.20%)
4. Other (1.10%)
