= Dehianga =

Dehianga දෙහිඅංග
- Village
- Interactive map of Dehianga
- Coordinates: 7°18′N 80°33′E
- Country: Sri Lanka
- Province: Central Province
- District: Kandy District
- Divisional secretariat: Yatinuwara
- Elevation: 618 m (2,028 ft)
- Time zone: UTC+5:30 (Sri Lanka Standard Time)
- Postal code: 20038

Dehianga is a village in Kandy District, Central Province, Sri Lanka. It is located northwest of Dehigama, and about 8.6 km (5.3 mi) from Kandy, in Yatinuwara Divisional Secretariat.

== History ==
The village was described as a hamlet with inhabitants of potters and some Moor families in Archibald Campbell Lawrie's 1896 gazetteer of the province.

== Demographics ==
Historical population
Year	Pop.	±%
1881	308	—
1891	318	+3.2%
1901	329	+3.5%
1911	432	+31.3%
1921	474	+9.7%
Dehianga was grouped with Waturakumbura and Gurugama during the 1871 census.

In the 1921 census, it was recorded that out of the population of 474 people, 134, or 28% of the population, was literate, more than double the 1911 literacy rate of 13%. Four were literate in English, compared to two in 1911. 99.6% of the population practiced Islam as their primary religion, and the other 0.4% reported practicing Hinduism.

== See also ==
- List of towns in Central Province, Sri Lanka
