= Motana Dekinda Grama Niladhari Division =

Motana Dekinda
- Grama Niladhari Division
- Interactive map of Motana Dekinda
- Coordinates: 7.275089°N 80.483710°E
- Country: Sri Lanka
- Province: Central Province
- District: Kandy District
- Divisional Secretariat: Yatinuwara Divisional Secretariat
- Electoral District: Kandy Electoral District
- Polling Division: Yatinuwara Polling Division

Area
  - Total: 0.79 km^{2} (0.31 sq mi)
- Elevation: 501 m (1,644 ft)

Population (2012)
  - Total: 463
  - Density: 586/km^{2} (1,520/sq mi)
- ISO 3166 code: LK-2136180

Motana Dekinda

Motana Dekinda Grama Niladhari Division is a Grama Niladhari Division of the Yatinuwara Divisional Secretariat of Kandy District of Central Province, Sri Lanka . It has Grama Niladhari Division Code 199.

Motana Dekinda is a surrounded by the Balana, Godigamuwa, Dunugama Maliyadda and Makehelwala Grama Niladhari Divisions.

== Demographics ==
=== Ethnicity ===
The Motana Dekinda Grama Niladhari Division has a Sinhalese majority (98.9%) . In comparison, the Yatinuwara Divisional Secretariat (which contains the Motana Dekinda Grama Niladhari Division) has a Sinhalese majority (89.9%)

Ethnicity in Motana Dekinda
1. Sinhalese (98.9%)
2. Other (1.10%)

=== Religion ===
The Motana Dekinda Grama Niladhari Division has a Buddhist majority (99.6%) . In comparison, the Yatinuwara Divisional Secretariat (which contains the Motana Dekinda Grama Niladhari Division) has a Buddhist majority (88.8%)

Religion in Motana Dekinda
1. Buddhist (99.6%)
2. Other (0.40%)
