= Kegalle (disambiguation) =

Kegalle is a town in Sri Lanka.

Kegalle can also refer to:

- Kegalle District, district in Sri Lanka
- Kegalle Divisional Secretariat, local secretariat in Sri Lanka
- Kegalle Electoral District, electoral district In Sri Lanka
- Kegalle Electoral District (1947–1989), former electoral district
- Kegalle Polling Division, Sri Lanka polling division
