= N. H. Keerthiratne =

Sri Lankan politician (1902–1992)

Hon. N. H. Keerthiratne
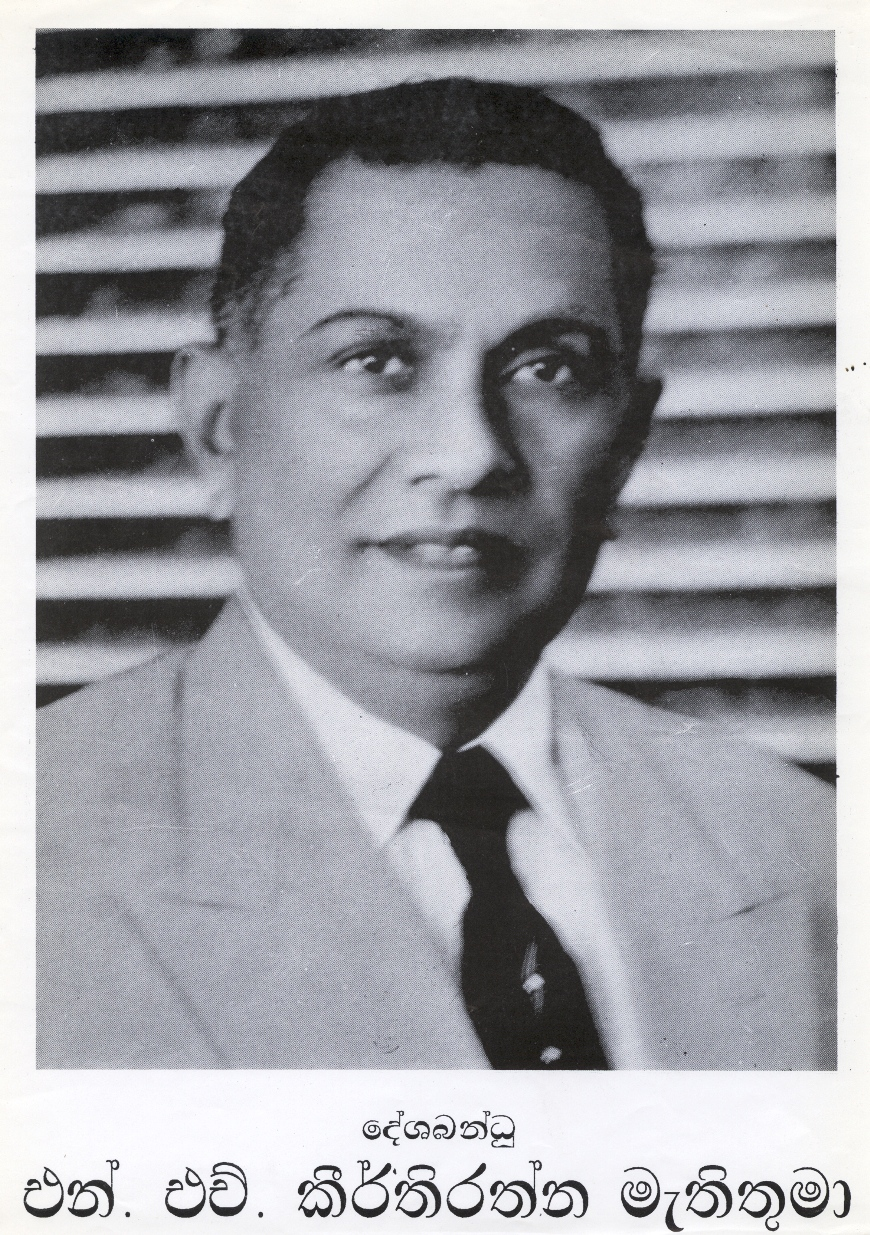

Member of Parliament for Kegalle
- In office 1947–1956
- Preceded by: seat created
- Succeeded by: P. B. G. Kalugalla

Personal details
- Born: Nuwarapaksa Hewayale Keerthiratne; 7 November 1902 Kegalle, Sri Lanka
- Died: 15 November 1992 (aged 90) Rambukkana, Sri Lanka
- Party: United National Party
- Relations: Asoka Karunaratne (brother)
- Children: Mihindu; Visaka Wickramarathna; Asoka; Sujatha Sirisena
- Education: St. Anthony's College, Kandy
- Occupation: Politics, Agronomy

Deshabandu Nuwarapaksa Hewayale Keerthiratne (7 November 1902 - 15 November 1992) was a Sri Lankan politician, philanthropist, and Parliamentary secretary to the Minister of Posts and Broadcasting. He was accepted as being a leader to the oppressed lower class at the time. Keerthiratne was also an agronomist.

== Early life ==
Nuwarapaksa Hewayale Keerthiratne was born 7 November 1902 in Rambukkana into a well-known family in Rambukkana – Kadugannawa area, who had become affluent by developing their own plantations at the beginning of the 20th century. His father, N. H. Abilinu was one of the largest land owners in Sri Lanka at the time. Keerthiratne was educated at St. Anthony's College, Kandy.

== Political career ==
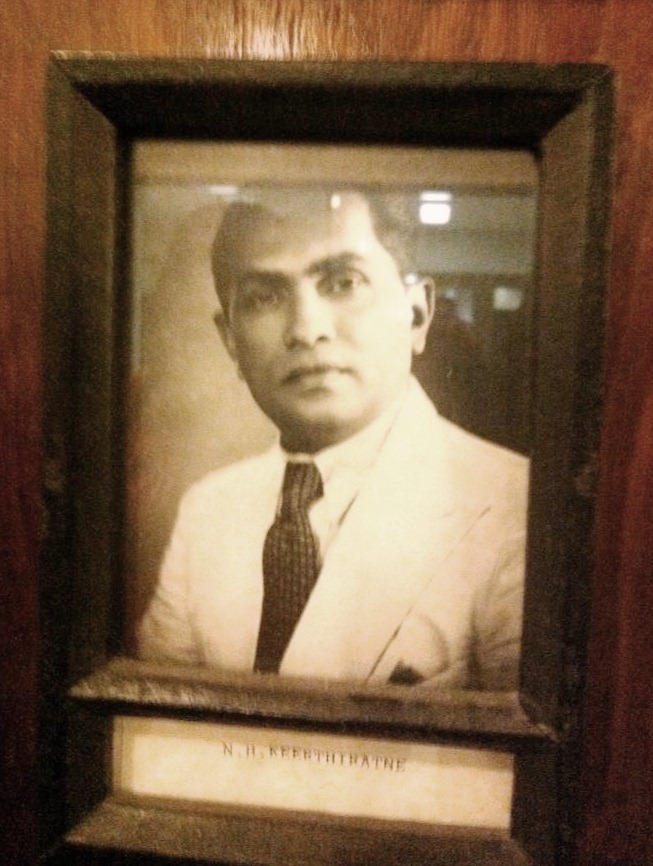
N. H. Keerthiratne - Parliament Portrait

In 1936, Keerthiratne contested the Dedigama electorate in the second State Council election against four main contestants, Dudley Senanayake, Richard Nugewela, P. B. Dedigama and Mudliyar J.W. Udalagama. Keerthiratne and his supporters were severely harassed and by some of the opponents there who were preventing him from running successful campaign. He responded to this by hiring a small aircraft and distributing election leaflets from the air, thereby making history — as this was the first time it was done in Sri Lanka. Senanayake was eventually elected with 17,045 votes with Keerthiratne securing 8,746 votes, whilst the other three candidates only received 1,476 amongst them.

Keerthiratne and his younger brother Asoka Karunaratne were known for their unique manner of breaking down barriers—by embracing a cooperative way of enriching relationships between individuals and groups. He represented the lower classes and minority castes, giving them a voice in the political arena for the first time. In the words of N.H. Keerthiratne who gave an interview in March 1978, "These people were not given any responsible position in the country. Their job was planting. For that there is no objection. So we started planting, coconuts, any other things, vegetables, we began planting and making money.... Even those caste minded people wanted money, so they had to come to these people who were making money."

In June 1939, Keerthiratne established the "Shasthrodaya Society" with the intention of uplifting the lives of underprivileged children in rural villages. Under this scheme, he was able to build more than 50 schools, which, in later years had an immense impact on development and well-being of the people in the communities.

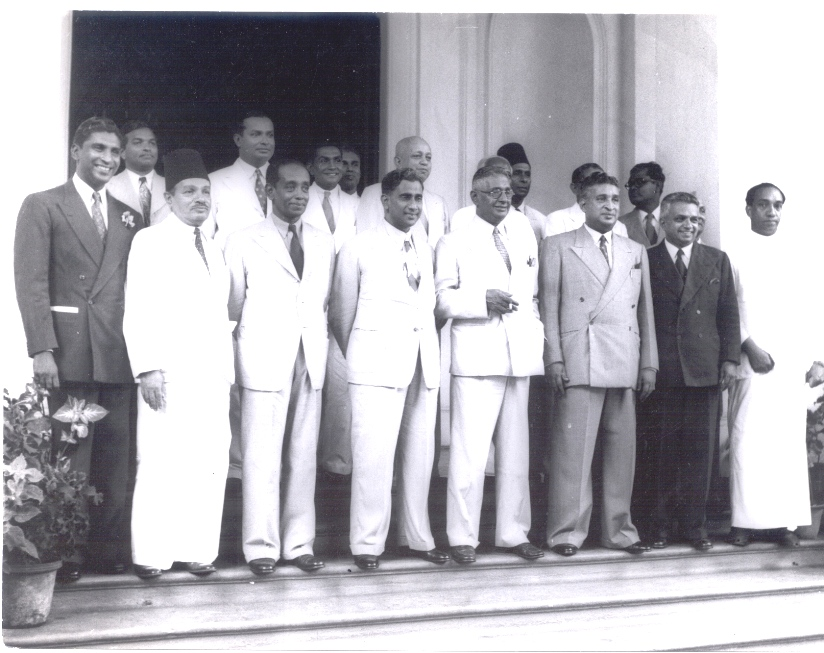
Sri Lanka - Cabinet of 1952 at Queen's House after swearing in ceremony on 17 June 1952

Keerthiratne contested in the Kegalle electorate during the first Parliamentary election of Sri Lanka in 1947, against R. V. Dedigama, and won by obtaining 14,550 votes. He retained the seat at the subsequent parliamentary elections in 1952, securing approximately 65% of the vote. In 1953, he was appointed Parliamentary secretary to the Minister of Posts and Telecommunications by Prime Minister Sir John Kotelawala. Keerthiratne has the unique distinction of being the first person to send a telegram in Sinhala. In 1956 he contested the Mawanella electorate, losing to C. R. Beligammana by over 7,500 votes. At the 4th parliamentary election held in March 1960 he ran as the United National Party candidate in the Kegalle electorate, but was defeated by the incumbent member, P. B. G. Kalugalla, by 1,608 votes. He ran again for the same seat at the subsequent elections in July 1960, again losing to Kalugalla.

Keerthiratne was a devout Buddhist and built more than thirty Buddhist temples throughout the island of Sri Lanka during his lifetime. His son Mihindu is a renowned architect, who designed the present United National Party headquarters in Pitakotte.

== Honours ==
In 1988 he was awarded the title of Deshamanya by the Sri Lankan Government, the third highest national honour awarded in the country.

== See also ==
- List of political families in Sri Lanka
