= Illawatura =

Coordinates: 7°10′N 80°35′E

Illawatura இல்லவதுர Illavatura
- Village
- Interactive map of Illawatura
- Country: Sri Lanka
- Province: Central Province
- District: Kandy District
- City: Gampola
- Time zone: UTC+5:30 (Sri Lanka Standard Time)

Illawatura (Tamil: இல்லவதுர) is a small village located in Gampola, Central Province, Sri Lanka. It lies about 6 kilometers (4 miles) east of the main city of Gampola, around 20 km (12 miles) south of the capital of Central Province, Kandy, and approximately 85 km (53 miles) west of the commercial capital of Sri Lanka, Colombo.

The population of Illawatura mainly consists of Muslims, with small groups of Hindus and Christians. The Mahaweli River flows through Illawatura.

The Illawatura Rahmaniya Muslim Vidyalaya Schule, the only school in Illawatura, teaches about 100 students. Illawatura lies approximately 750 meters (2,460 ft) from Zahira College, Gampola.

== Demographics ==
Historical population
Year	Pop.	±%
1881	342	—
1891	454	+32.7%

== See also ==
- List of towns in Central Province, Sri Lanka
