= P. B. Kaviratne =

Sri Lankan politician

Ratnayake Mudiyanselage Punchi Banda Kaviratne (born 3 February 1936) was a Sri Lankan politician. He was the Minister of Cultural Affairs and member of Parliament of Sri Lanka from Rattota representing the United National Party.

He was elected to parliament from Rattota in the 1977 general election defeating S. B. Yalegama and retained his seat in the 1970 general election, but lost it in the 1977 general election and was re-elected in the 1989 general election. Sanjeeva Kaviratne was his son.
