= D. M. Jayaratne =

Sri Lankan politician (1931–2019)

Dissanayaka Mudiyanselage Jayaratne
- දිසානායක මුදියන්සේලාගේ ජයරත්න திசாநாயக்க முதியன்சேலாகே ஜயரத்ன
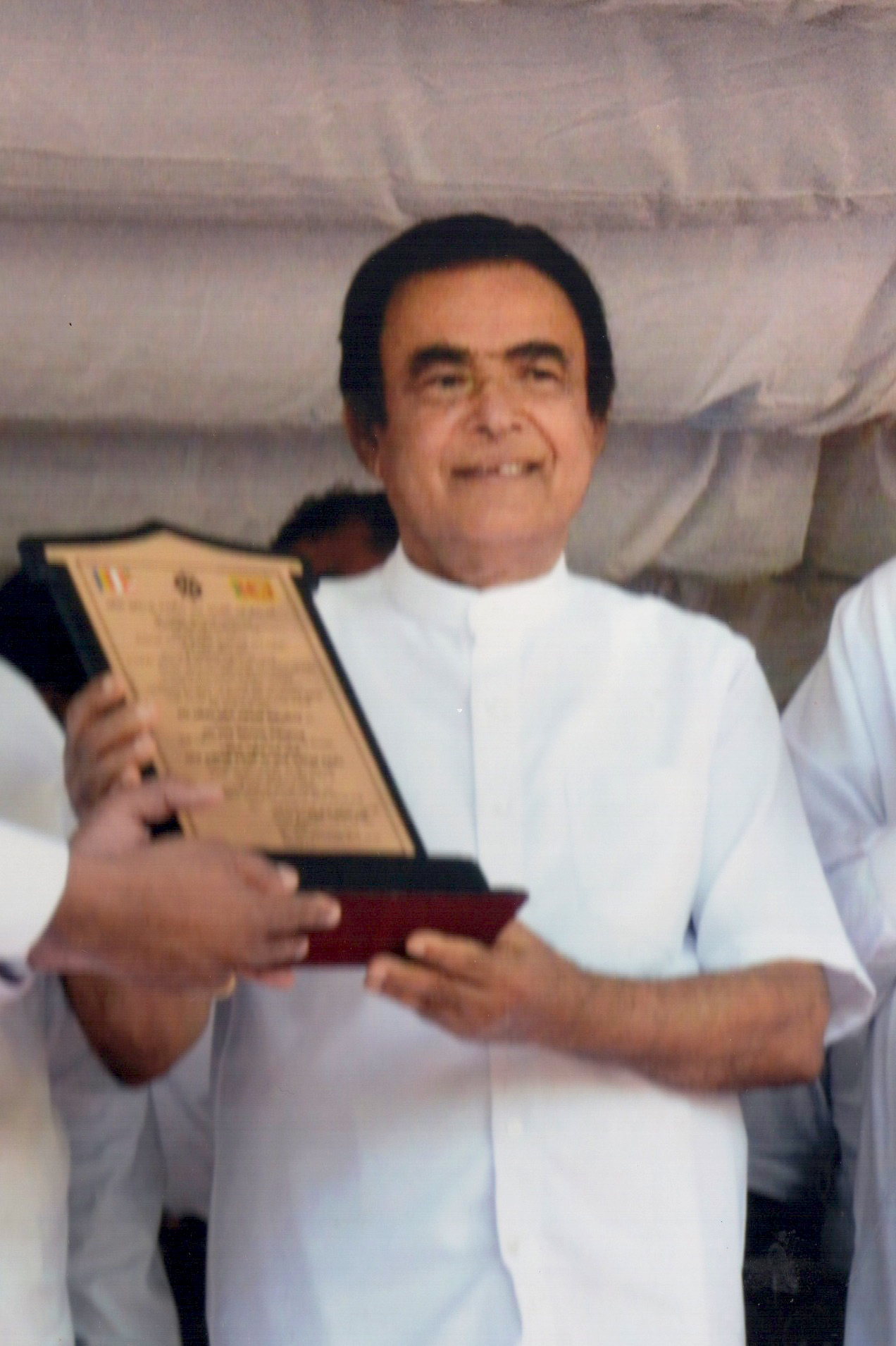

14th Prime Minister of Sri Lanka
- In office 21 April 2010 – 9 January 2015
- President: Mahinda Rajapaksa
- Preceded by: Ratnasiri Wickremanayake
- Succeeded by: Ranil Wickremesinghe

Minister of Buddhasasana & Religious Affairs
- In office 8 July 2010 – 7 July 2015
- President: Mahinda Rajapaksa
- Prime Minister: Himself

Minister of Plantations
- In office 6 August 2007 – 6 August 2010
- President: Mahinda Rajapaksa
- Prime Minister: Ratnasiri Wickremanayake

Minister of Posts, Telecommunications & Upcountry Development
- In office 8 August 2004 – 6 September 2007
- President: Mahinda Rajapaksa; Chandrika Kumaratunga
- Prime Minister: Ratnasiri Wickremanayake; Mahinda Rajapaksa

Minister of Agriculture
- In office 1 June 2000 – 9 July 2001
- President: Chandrika Kumaratunga
- Prime Minister: Ranil Wickremesinghe

Member of Parliament for Kandy District
- In office 5 January 2004 – 7 January 2010
- In office 1 July 1989 – 29 December 2001

Member of Parliament for National List
- In office 7 January 2010 – 6 June 2015
- In office 30 December 2001 – 2 January 2004

Personal details
- Born: Dissanayaka Mudiyanselage Jayaratne; 4 June 1931 Colombo, Sri Lanka
- Died: 19 November 2019 (aged 88) Kandy, Sri Lanka
- Party: Sri Lanka Freedom Party
- Other political affiliations: United People's Freedom Alliance
- Children: Anuradha Jayaratne
- Education: Doluwa Maha Vidyalaya, Gampola; Zahira College, Gampola
- Occupation: Teacher; postmaster; politician

Dissanayaka Mudiyanselage Jayaratne (Sinhala: දිසානායක මුදියන්සේලාගේ ජයරත්න, Tamil: திசாநாயக்க முதியன்சேலாகே ஜயரத்ன; 4 June 1931 – 19 November 2019), commonly known as D. M. "Di Mu" Jayaratne, was a Sri Lankan politician who served as Prime Minister of Sri Lanka from 2010 to 2015. A founding member of the Sri Lanka Freedom Party, Jayaratne was first elected to parliament in 1970.

== Early life ==
Dissanayaka Mudiyanselage Jayaratne was born on 4 June 1931. He was educated at Doluwa Maha Vidyalaya and Zahira College in Gampola, a town just outside Kandy. Following the founding of the Sri Lanka Freedom Party in 1951 by S. W. R. D. Bandaranaike, Jayaratne worked as a teacher at Doluwa Maha Vidyalaya. He later worked as postmaster at Doluwa from 1960 to 1962.

== Political career ==
Jayaratne started his political career after being elected as a member of the Village Council of Doluwa, where he later became chairman of the Village Council. He also became president of the Kandy District Village Council Chairmen Association and a member of the Federation of All Ceylon Village Council.

He first entered parliament following the 1970 general election, obtaining 14,463 votes as the Sri Lanka Freedom Party (SLFP) candidate in the Gampola electorate, defeating W. M. P. B. Dissanayake of the United National Party (UNP). He was subsequently defeated by Dissanayake in the 1977 election, which saw only 8 members of the SLFP return to parliament. He was re-elected to parliament in 1989 from the Kandy District under the new preferential voting system. He obtained 54,290 preferential votes, topping the SLFP list in the Kandy District.

Re-elected to parliament under the People's Alliance in 1994, Jayaratne was appointed Minister of Land, Agriculture and Forestry by president Chandrika Kumaratunga, entering the cabinet for the first time. He held several senior party positions such as Secretary General of People's United Front and Senior Vice President of the Sri Lanka Freedom Party. Ministerial appointments Jayaratne held included:

- Minister of Lands, Agriculture, Forestry and Livestock (1994)
- Minister of Agriculture, Land and Forestry (1997)
- Minister of Agriculture and Land (1999)
- Minister of Agriculture (2000)
- Minister of Agriculture Land Forestry Food and Cooperative Development (2001 Probationary Government)
- Minister of Post and Communication (2004 while being in the Opposition)
- Minister of Post and Telecommunication (2004)
- Minister of Telecommunication and Rural Economic Promotion (2005)
- Minister of Telecommunication and Upcountry Development (2006)
- Minister of Plantation Industries (2007)

=== Prime ministership (2010–2015) ===
Following the electoral victory of the United People's Freedom Alliance at the 2010 general election, Jayaratne, the most senior member of the SLFP, was sworn in as prime minister on 21 April 2010. Jayaratne simultaneously held the position of Minister of Buddha Sasana and Religious Affairs.

== Personal life and death ==
Jayaratne had three children. His youngest son, Anuradha Jayaratne, is a member of parliament and former State Minister.

On 19 November 2019, Jayaratne died at the age of 88.

== See also ==
- List of heads of the executive by approval rating
- List of political families in Sri Lanka
- Cabinet of Sri Lanka

Political offices
Preceded by Ratnasiri Wickremanayake	Prime Minister of Sri Lanka; 2010–2015	Succeeded by Ranil Wickremesinghe
