= Dehigama =

- Village
- Interactive map of Dehigama
- Country: Sri Lanka
- Province: Central Province
- Divisional secretariat: Yatinuwara
- Time zone: UTC+5:30 (Sri Lanka Standard Time)

Dehigama is a village in Sri Lanka. It is located within Kandy District, Central Province.

== Demographics ==
Historical population
Year	Pop.	±%
1881	308	—
1891	361	+17.2%
1901	432	+19.7%
1911	521	+20.6%
Dehianga was grouped with Waturakumbura and Gurugama during the 1871 census.

== See also ==
- List of towns in Central Province, Sri Lanka
