= Munaweera =

Munaweera is a surname. Notable people with the surname include:

- Chandrasena Munaweera (9 July 1926 and died in June 1997), Sri Lankan politician, educator, journalist, and author
- Dilshan Munaweera (born 1989), Sri Lankan cricketer
- Gayan Munaweera (born 1991), Sri Lankan cricketer
- Nayomi Munaweera, Sri Lankan writer
