= Richard Aluwihare =

Sri Lankan civil servant

Sir Richard Aluwihare KCMG, CBE, JP, CCS

High Commissioner for Ceylon to India
- In office 1957–1963
- Preceded by: Edwin Wijeyeratne
- Succeeded by: Hamilton Shirley Amerasinghe

12th Inspector General of Police (Sri Lanka)
- In office 1947–1955
- Deputy: Osmund de Silva
- Preceded by: Ranulph Bacon
- Succeeded by: Osmund de Silva

Personal details
- Born: 23 May 1895
- Died: 22 December 1976 (aged 81)
- Spouse: Lucille née Moonemalle
- Children: Phyllis Sita, Ena de Silva
- Profession: Civil servant

Sir Richard Aluwihare, KCMG, CBE, JP, CCS (23 May 1895 – 22 December 1976) was a Sri Lankan civil servant. He was the first Ceylonese Inspector General of Police and Ceylon's High Commissioner to India.

== Early life and education ==
Richard Aluwihare was born on 23 May 1895, the son of T. B. Aluwihare and Panabokke Tikiri Kumarihamy, daughter of Panabokke Dissawe. His younger brother, Bernard (1902 – 1961), was a Sri Lankan Cabinet Minister and Member of Parliament from Matale. Aluwihare was educated at Christ Church College, Matale and Trinity College, Kandy. At Trinity College he was a Senior Prefect, won the Ryde Gold Medal and the Trinity Lion for cricket in 1915.

== Military service ==
With the outbreak of World War I, he enlisted in the British Army serving in the Middlesex Regiment at Flanders, 1916 and was severely wounded in the Battle of the Somme. He returned to Ceylon in 1920. He was the Secretary to the Kandyan deputation on constitutional reforms that was sent to England.

== Civil service career ==
In October 1920, he was appointed to the Ceylon Civil Service as a cadet by the Governor of Ceylon under special war service and was attached to the Jaffna Kachcheri in October 1921. In February 1922 having passed his civil service examinations, he was appointed Office Assistant to the Director of Agriculture and Assistant Registrar Cooperative Societies. In October 1923 he was posted as Acting Police Magistrate, Dandagamuwa. Promoted to Officer of Class 4, he was posted as Police Magistrate in Point Pedro in November 1923 and Police Magistrate Panadura in November 1924. Promoted to Officer of Class 3, he was appointed Second Landing Surveyor, HM Customs in 1926, Commissioner of Requests, Additional District Judge, Additional Police Magistrate, Kandy and Additional District Judge, Kegalla in 1928; Assistant Settlement Officer in 1929 and District Judge, Nuwara Eliya in 1931. Promoted to Officer of Class 2 in 1932, he was attached to the General Treasury in 1934 and was appointed Controller of Finance and Supply. In 1937, he was appointed Assistant Government Agent, Kegalla and in 1939 he was attached to the HM Customs as Deputy Collector of Customs, Colombo. In December 1941 he was appointed acting Government Agent, North Central Province. Promoted to Officer of Class 1, in January 1944, he was appointed Government Agent, Central Province in 1946.

On 6 January 1947 he was appointed first Ceylonese Inspector General of Police of the Ceylon Police Force. In 1948 he established the Police Training School in Kalutara. He retired from the civil service as Inspector General and was succeeded by his son-in-law Osmund de Silva.

== Later life ==
After his retirement in 1955 Aluwihare went into politics and contested the parliamentary seat of Kalawewa from the United National Party in 1956 and was soundly defeated. In June 1957, he was appointed Ceylon's High Commissioner in India a position he retained until 1963. Aluwihare died on 22 December 1976 at the age of eighty one.

== Family ==
He married Lucille née Moonemalle, daughter of Theodore Barcroft L. Moonemalle, member of the Legislative Council of Ceylon, on 18 October 1920. They had two daughters Phyllis Sita, who married Jayampathy Charitha Ratwatte II, later member of the State Council of Ceylon and Ena (1922 – 2015), who married a career police officer, Osmund de Silva. De Silva succeeded his father-in-law as Inspector General of Police.

== Honours ==
He was appointed a Commander of the Order of the British Empire (CBE) and was knighted as a Knights Bachelor in the 1948 Birthday Honours for services in reorganizing the Ceylon Police Force. He was appointed Knight Commander of the Order of St Michael and St George (KCMG) in the 1950 Birthday Honours for services to Ceylon. For service in the Great War, he received the British War Medal and the Victory Medal, during his civil service career he received the King George V Silver Jubilee Medal, the King George VI Coronation Medal and during his service as IGP he received the Ceylon Police Independence Medal and the Queen Elizabeth II Coronation Medal.

== Legacy ==
The parade ground at the Police Training College in Kalutura is named the Aluwihare Grounds. The winner of the Trinity–Antonian Cricket Encounter (Battle of the Blues) is awarded the Sir Richard Aluwihare Trophy. Aluwihare also has a street (Richard Aluwihare Mawatha) named after him in Matale.

Police appointments
Preceded by Ranulph Bacon	Inspector General of Police; 1947–1955	Succeeded by Osmund de Silva
