= Dehideniya =

- Village
- Interactive map of Dehideniya
- Coordinates: 7°16′39″N 80°35′06″E
- Country: Sri Lanka
- Province: Central Province
- Time zone: UTC+5:30 (Sri Lanka Standard Time)

Dehideniya is a village in Sri Lanka. It is located within Central Province.

== History ==
Dehideniya's first settler was Dehideniya Bandara of Godapola, according to Archibald Campbell Lawrie's 1896 gazetteer of the province.

== Demographics ==
Census	Pop.	Ref.
1881	98	
1891	79	

== See also ==
- List of towns in Central Province, Sri Lanka
