= Nimal Karunatilake =

Ceylonese journalist, author and politician

Hon. Nimal Karunatillake

Member of the Ceylon Parliament for Matale
- In office 1956–1960
- Preceded by: Bernard Aluwihare
- Succeeded by: Bernard Aluwihare

Personal details
- Born: Hettiarachchige Nimal Chandrasoma Karunatillake; 3 October 1926
- Died: 4 July 1987 (aged 60)
- Party: Sri Lanka Freedom Party; United National Party
- Education: Dharmaraja College, Kandy
- Profession: journalist, politician

Hettiarachchige Nimal Chandrasoma Karunatillake (3 October 1926 – 4 July 1987) was a Ceylonese journalist, author and politician.

Karunatillake served as a press officer for the Prime Minister Dudley Senanayake and he also worked as a journalist at Lankadeepa.

He was elected to the seat of Matale at the 3rd parliamentary elections held in 1956, representing the Sri Lanka Freedom Party. He defeated the incumbent United National Party politician, Bernard Aluwihare, polling 12,968 votes (55% of the total vote), 2,596 votes ahead of Aluwihare. On 18 November 1958 he was appointed as Parliamentary Secretary to the Minister of Finance, serving in that role until 19 May 1959.

At the 4th parliamentary election, held on 19 March 1960, he unsuccessfully contested the seat of Rattota, representing the Mahajana Eksath Peramuna. He came third receiving 18% of the total vote.

He then ran in the Ratnapura electorate at the 5th parliamentary election, held on 20 July 1960, again for the Mahajana Eksath Peramuna. He came third, this time he only obtained 332 votes (1.5% of the total vote), 12,645 votes behind the successful candidate Dhanapala Weerasekera.

He unsuccessfully contested the seat of Kegalle at the 6th parliamentary election held on 22 March 1965, as the United National Party candidate. He fell short by 2,361 votes, polling 13,283 votes (46% of the total vote).

Karunatillake died on 4 July 1987.
