= Theodore Barcroft L. Moonemalle =

Lawyer

Theodore Barcroft Lewis Moonemalle (born 1868) was a Ceylonese lawyer and legislator. He was the Kandyan Sinhalese member of the Legislative Council of Ceylon.

Born in Kurunegala to John M. L. Moonemalle a proctor, he educated at Trinity College, Kandy and became a proctor of the District Court of Kurunagala in 1890. In 1897, he passed the exams to become a proctor of the Supreme Court. He served on several occasions as the acting district judge, commissioner of requests and police magistrate of Kurunagala. In 1906, he was appointed to the Legislative Council of Ceylon.

His daughter was Lady Lucille Aluwihare, wife of Sir Richard Aluwihare, the first Ceylonese Inspector General of Police.
