= Asoka Karunaratne =

Sri Lankan politician and philanthropist

Hon. Asoka Karunaratne
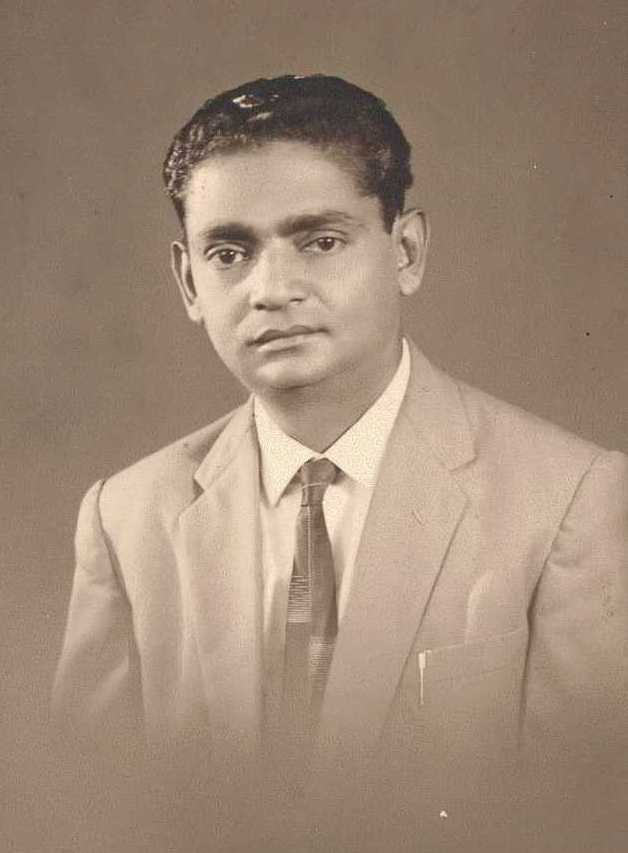

Personal details
- Born: 26 January 1916 Kegalle, Sri Lanka
- Died: 24 February 1988 (aged 72)
- Party: United National Party
- Education: St. Anthony's College, Kandy, Nalanda College Colombo
- Occupation: Politics

Nuvarapaksa Hevalage Asoka Mahanama Karunaratne (26 January 1916 – 24 February 1988) (known as Asoka Karunaratne) was a Sri Lankan politician and philanthropist. As Cabinet Minister of Social Services, he dedicated most of his life to empowering the underprivileged people in Sri Lanka.

== Early life and death ==
Karunaratne was born in Rambukkana and was educated at St. Anthony's College, Kandy and Nalanda College Colombo. He developed a great interest in Sinhala and English literature and was an avid reader. After passing with merits in his Cambridge Senior Exam, World War II erupted, hindering his future plans of attending university in England. Consequently, he took up a career as a landowner before being elected to the Rambukkana town council in 1947.

Karunaratne was the younger brother of Mr. N. H. Keerthiratne, who was also a distinguished politician and Cabinet Minister. Both were known for their unique manner of breaking down barriers—by embracing a cooperative way of enriching relationships between individuals and groups.

Karunaratne died in 1988 of a heart attack.

== Political career ==
As a founding member, Karunaratne was associated with the Sri Lanka Freedom Party (SLFP) earlier in his career. He was elected chairman of the Rambukkana town council in 1953 at the inauguration of that local body. He played a crucial role in Prime Minister S. W. R. D. Bandaranaike's victory in the 1956 General Election by addressing a number of meetings, appealing to his relations and party supporters to rally behind the victory. Karunaratne entered the legislature in 1958 when S. W. R. D. Bandaranaike appointed him to the House of Representatives. He has the unique distinction of being the first Sinhalese to enter parliament as an appointment member, a tribute to the silent but very effective and unrepresented Sinhala opinion and interests at the time. At the general election of March & July 1960, he contested the newly demarcated Rambukkana seat as the candidate of the SLFP and was elected by a majority of over 6000 votes. He retained the same seat in the subsequent General Election held in July 1960 and was appointed Parliamentary Secretary to the Minister of Justice by Premier Sirimavo Bandaranaike.

In 1963, over a difference of opinion, Karunaratne resigned from the SLFP and joined the United National Party (UNP) and helped C. P. de Silva initiate the Sri Lanka Freedom Socialist Party, which was in coalition with the UNP. He was appointed Minister of Social Services in the Dudley Senanayake government. Though he was defeated at the General Election of 1970, he recontested the Rambukkana electorate as the candidate of the UNP in July 1977 and was elected by a comfortable majority and reappointed as Minister of Social Services by Prime Minister J. R. Jayewardene.

In 1982 he led the Sri Lankan delegation to the World Assembly on Aging held in Vienna which was sponsored by the United Nations. Thereafter he made a tour of Denmark, Sweden, Thailand, Singapore, India, and Japan. He strengthened the relations between Sri Lanka and ESCAP, UNICEF, and ICSW and also signed several agreements with foreign organisations and governments beneficial to children, the handicapped, and elders.

== Contribution to Society ==
During his stewardship as Minister of Social Services, Karunaratne initiated action to enhance public assistance and introduced rehabilitation programmes for the handicapped. He also steered a bill in parliament to register all voluntary social service organisations in Sri Lanka, as he was convinced of the vital role these organisations had to play in the field of social service.

Karunaratne was known for breaking down barriers of separatism—prejudice, exclusiveness of caste, race, and creed had long been the bane of Sri Lankan society. He maintained focus on extending educational opportunities and the equalisation of opportunity to regenerate the social structure of Sri Lanka.

He established Asoka Maha Vidyalaya in Rambukkana along with several other schools and orphanages throughout the district. Asoka Karunaratne also built Buddhist temples in Rambukkana.

== See also ==
- List of political families in Sri Lanka
