= Tikiri Bandara Panabokke I =

Ceylonese colonial-era legislator

Tikiri Bandara Panabokke I (known as Panabokke Dissawa) was a Ceylonese colonial-era legislator. He was the Kandyan Sinhalese member of the Legislative Council of Ceylon, a Police Magistrate for Kandy and acting Diyawadana Nilame. Panabokke along with L.T.R. Le Mesurier of the Ceylon Civil Service, translated into English Kandyan the Code of Law Kandian.

His first marriage was to Dambawinne Kumarihamy, daughter of Dambawinne Rate Mahattaya. The marriage produced two daughters Panebokke Tikiri Kumarihamy and Panebokke Kumarihamy. Panebokke Tikiri Kumarihamy married T. B. Aluwihare, they had two sons, Richard Aluwihare and Bernard Aluwihare before her death two days after the birth of their second son. Panebokke Kumarihamy married a Ratwatte, their son was W. A. Ratwatte. Panabokke Dissawa's second marriage to Halangoda Kumarihamy, daughter of Halangoda Rate Mahattaya produced two sons and six daughters which included Sir Tikiri Bandara Panabokke II.

== See also ==
- List of political families in Sri Lanka
