= Vijaya College, Matale =

- Kandy Road, Matale 21000, Sri Lanka; Sri Lanka

Information
- Type: Public
- Motto: "අප්පමත්තා නමියන්ති" "Appamatta Namiyanthi" (Those who are vigilant never die)
- Established: 1886; 140 years ago
- Founder: Henry Steel Olcott
- Grades: Class 1 – 13
- Enrollment: 3,500+
- Colours: Red, blue and yellow
- Alumni: Old Vijayans

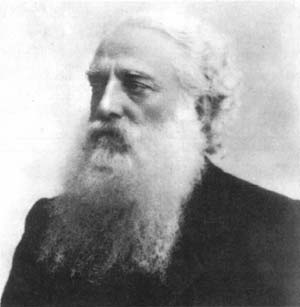
Colonel H.S. Olcott, founder of Vijaya College

Matale Vijaya College (Sinhalaවිද්‍යාලය), or (VCM) is a college situated in Matale, Sri Lanka.

== History ==
In 1886 Sir Henry Steel Olcott, Stephen Silva, Sir Don Baron Jayatilaka, A. D. S. Wickramasekara, and Prof. Batuwantudawe founded the school. They wished to renew Buddhist culture in Sri Lanka. Alongside the Matale Ubaya Lokarth Society, the new school was initially known as the Buddhist Institute Boys school.

Shroff Ratwatte donated land at Hetti Vediya, Matale including a thatched building. The first principal was Godawela. The initial enrollment was 150 students. This school was later moved to a building at Gongawela in 1889 with the help of the Parama Vidyartha Buddhist Society.

Between 1888 and 1912, Batuwantudawe, Shumawa, Francis Soysa, Weerasinghe, and D. S. de Silva served as principals, with M. B. Navaratne, A. D. William Silva, W. A. M. Peiris Silva, and D. P. Wanigasekara serving for the following 10 years. From 1922 to 1951, the principal was Karaliyadda and V. T. Nanayakkara.

From 1922 to 1931, V. B. Karaliyadde served as principal, and by 1923 the school building was brought to its present location. On the guidance of Karaliyadde, Hulanganuwa Rate Mahattaya and Sediyas Silva bought and donated the present land to Vijaya College. From 1931 to 1951, Nanayakkara served as the principal expanding the buildings.

On 23 March 1938, the school was renamed to Vijaya College by then principal, V. T. Nanayakkara.

Gunasena Hall was built by the J. E. Gunasena in 1947 and donated to the school. Sports were introduced at that time.

== Houses ==
- Ananda -
- Nalanda -
- Dharmaraja -
- Mahinda -

== Enrollment ==
As of July 2020, more than 3,500 students studied at the college. The curriculum included grade 5 scholarship exams, O/L and A/L.

== Battle of the Brothers ==
Battle of the Brothers is the annual limited-overs cricket encounter between Vijaya College and Christ Church College, Matale, two of the oldest schools in Matale. The series was inaugurated in 2009 and is played at the Bernard Aluwihare Stadium in Matale.

The inaugural match in 2009 ended without a result after being abandoned due to heavy rain. Vijaya College won the next four encounters from 2010 to 2013, while Christ Church College recorded victories in 2014, 2015 and 2016. After a decade-long interruption, the encounter resumed on 19 June 2026, with Vijaya College winning the match and extending its lead in the series.

As of 2026, Vijaya College leads the series with five wins, while Christ Church College has won three matches, and one match ended without a result.

== Vijaya Sevens ==
The Vijaya Sevens national hockey tournament is organized every year. The Vijaya Sevens Old Vijayans Challenge Trophy event began in 1999. The match is played at Bernard Aluvihara Stadium and Edward Park Hockey Stadium in association with the college.

This match is open to all island hockey clubs affiliated with the Sri Lanka Hockey Federation. These competitions are held in the league and knockout format. The nation's leading sports clubs such as the Sri Lanka Army, Sri Lanka Navy, Sri Lanka Air Force, and Sri Lanka Police and School Sports Clubs join the competition.

The official theme song for the Challenge Trophy is "Vijaya Sarade", created in 2015. The song was written by Danushka Kumarathunga and composed by Krishantha Premachandra.

- Vijaya Hockey 7s 22nd All-Island Tournament 2023
