= Chandrasena Munaweera =

Sri Lankan politician

Chandrasena Munaweera was a Sri Lankan politician, educator, journalist, and author (novelist) from the Matale District. He was born on 9 July 1926 and died in June 1997. He was a member of Parliament of Sri Lanka from Rattota representing the Sri Lanka Freedom Party. His wife's name was Mallika.

He was elected to parliament from Rattota electorate in the March 1960 general election and was re-elected in the July 1960 general election, defeating V. T. Nanayakkara. He crossed over to the opposition with C. P. de Silva in December 1964. He lost is seat in the 1965 general election to S. B. Yalegama of the Sri Lanka Freedom Party when he contested on the Sri Lanka Freedom Socialist Party ticket and was defeated by Yalegama in the 1970 general election, when he contested as the United National Party candidate.

== Political Career ==
Chandrasena Munaweera, who came from Matale District in Sri Lanka, was a politician. He was born on 9 July 1926, with his death happening in June 1997. He generally held right-wing conservative views. He is well known in history of the Sri Lanka due to role he played as a leader in a 1964 political effort that ended the government of Prime Minister Sirimavo Bandaranaike at the time. He acted as an MP for the Rattota area in Parliament for about 4 years 6 months and 1 day, starting from 19 March 1960 and ending on 17 December 1964. He began his MP journey with Sri Lanka Freedom Party (SLFP), taking the "Hand" symbol. He defeated his same top opponent two times:

1. March 1960 General Election: He was elected to parliament from Rattota for the first time. He won 6,198 votes and defeated V. T. Nanayakkara of the United National Party (UNP).
2. July 1960 General Election: He was re-elected to parliament from Rattota in a follow-up election. He increased his support to 8,589 votes (50.14% of the total vote), again defeating V. T. Nanayakkara.

== Leadership in the December 1964 Government Collapse ==
In 1964 Prime Minister Sirimavo Bandaranaike formed a government with the Lanka Sama Samaja Party (LSSP), a far-left political party. This made a lot of people in her party very upset. They did not like the laws, like the Press Takeover Bill.

On 3 December 1964 Munaweera took a major political risk. He joined a group of people from his party, the SLFP and they all decided to leave. They were led by C. P. De Silva, a senior minister. Munaweera and this group of 13 to 14 people moved to the side of the room, where the opposition was sitting.

This was a deal. The prime minister Sirimavo Bandaranaike did not have people on her side anymore. When they voted on the Throne Speech the government lost by one vote, 74 to 73. The government had to end the parliament and call for new elections in 1965.

Munaweera and the others helped end the coalition government of Prime Minister Sirimavo Bandaranaike with the left-leaning party, the Lanka Sama Samaja Party (LSSP). Historical texts and declassified papers from that time say that Munaweera was very important, in bringing down the Sirimavo Bandaranaike government. The Sirimavo Bandaranaike administration ended because of what Munaweera and the others did.

== Later Election Losses (1965–1977) ==
After leaving the SLFP in 1964 Munaweera helped form a party called the Sri Lanka Freedom Socialist Party (SLFSP). They used the "Sun" symbol. He tried to win back his seat in parliament but couldn't. He lost three elections in a row:

1. 1965 General Election: He contested the Rattota seat on the new SLFSP ticket. He received 9,363 votes but lost the seat to S. B. Yalegama of the SLFP.
2. 1970 General Election: He ran again for Rattota, this time switching to the United National Party (UNP) under the "Elephant" symbol. He received 11,536 votes but was defeated again by S. B. Yalegama.
3. 1977 General Election: He made a final attempt to return to parliament from Matale. He received 9,039 votes (28.84% of the total vote) but was defeated by Alick Aluvihare.

== Complete Electoral Performance Table ==
Year	Election Ticket / Party	Symbol	Votes Received	% of Total Vote	Election Outcome	Main Opponent
Mar 1960	Sri Lanka Freedom Party (SLFP)	Hand	6,198	36.39%	Won	V. T. Nanayakkara (UNP)
Jul 1960	Sri Lanka Freedom Party (SLFP)	Hand	8,589	50.14%	Won	V. T. Nanayakkara (UNP)
1965	Sri Lanka Freedom Socialist Party (SLFSP)	Sun	9,363	39.81%	Lost	S. B. Yalegama (SLFP)
1970	United National Party (UNP)	Elephant	11,536	41.51%	Lost	S. B. Yalegama (SLFP)
1977	Sri Lanka Freedom Party (SLFP)	Hand	9,039	28.84%	Lost	Alick Aluvihare (UNP)

== Professional Career and Public Leadership ==
Outside of the work that Munaweera did in parliament Munaweera had a career that was very different. Munaweera worked in education and media. Munaweera also did some community leadership work. Munaweera was involved in things outside of parliament such as:

- English Language Teacher: He worked professionally as an educator teaching English language.
- Union Leader: He served as a labor union leader to organize and protect worker rights.
- Journalist: He worked as a professional journalist, writing news and articles for major national press networks including Times Sri Lanka and Lakehouse Sri Lanka.
- Literature Club President: He actively led local cultural organizations, serving as the president of the literature clubs in both Matale and Gampola, Sri Lanka.

== Author and literary work ==
Later in life, Munaweera authored a book, a Sinhalese language novel with the following publishing details:

== Footnote ==
Chandrasena Munaweera's political actions were written down as a matter in Sri Lanka. The courts looked at his decision to switch sides, the way he voted in parliament and the things he did to campaign in his area. All of these things were officially examined by the courts in a big case called Wimalasara Banda, v. Yalegama. This was an important election petition case. Munaweera's political actions were a part of this case. Chandrasena Munaweera passed away in June 1997, leaving behind a legacy of public service. His funeral, held at a college ground, was attended by local political leaders and community members who gathered to honor his life and contributions. In a mark of national respect, then-acting president Chandrika Bandaranaike Kumaratunga sent a formal condolence message, which was read aloud by an official representative at the ceremony.
