= Menikdiwela =

- Town
- Location in Central Province, Sri Lanka
- Coordinates: 7°5′N 80°44′E
- Country: Sri Lanka
- Province: Central Province
- District: Kandy District

Population (2008)
  - Total: 1,000

Languages
- Time zone: UTC+5:30 (Sri Lanka Time)

Menikdiwela is a town in Yatinuwara Divisional Secretariat, Kandy District, Central Province, Sri Lanka.

== Geography and Demography ==
The town is situated near the Kegalle District border. Kandy is the nearest city, c. 20 kilometres (12 mi) away.

According to the Local governing body, the population of Menikdiwela as of 2008 is about 1,000.

== Civil affair ==
The town is famous for various agricultural products like rice. Menikdiwela is also the hometown of Sirasa Superstar first season second Runner-up Amila Perera and J. R. Jayawardane's official secretariat W. M. P. B. Menikdiwela. In the beginning, the town started with only seven houses and developed.

Kandy-Pottapitiya and Kandy-Hataraliyadda (Via Thismada) roads split in Menikdiwela Junction.

Menikdiwela Central College is also located at Menikdiwela.
