= Rattota Electoral District =

Former Sri Lankan electoral district

Rattota electoral district was an electoral district of Sri Lanka between March 1960 and February 1989. The district was named after the town of Rattota in Matale District, Central Province. The 1978 Constitution of Sri Lanka introduced the proportional representation electoral system for electing members of Parliament. The existing 160 mainly single-member electoral districts were replaced with 22 multi-member electoral districts. Rattota electoral district was replaced by the Matale multi-member electoral district at the 1989 general elections.

== Members of Parliament ==
Key

Independent SLFP UNP

| Election | Member | Party | Term |
|---|---|---|---|
| 1960 (March) | Chandrasena Munaweera | Sri Lanka Freedom Party | 1960 |
| 1960 (July) | Chandrasena Munaweera | Sri Lanka Freedom Party | 1960-1965 |
| 1965 | S. B. Yalegama | Sri Lanka Freedom Party | 1965-1970 |
| 1970 | S. B. Yalegama | Sri Lanka Freedom Party | 1970-1977 |
| 1977 | P. B. Kaviratne | United National Party | 1977-1989 |

== Elections ==
=== 1960 (March) Parliamentary General Election ===
Results of the 4th parliamentary election held on 19 March 1960:

| Candidate | Party | Symbol | Votes | % |
|---|---|---|---|---|
| Chandrasena Munaweera | Sri Lanka Freedom Party | Hand | 6,198 | 36.39 |
| V. T. Nanayakkara | United National Party | Elephant | 4,937 | 28.99 |
| Nimal Karunatilake | Mahajana Eksath Peramuna | Cartwheel | 1,587 | 17.78 |
| Thomas Jayatunga | | Bell | 1,339 | 7.86 |
| G.S. Abeyawardena | | Clock | 803 | 4.72 |
| Tikiri Banda Elkaduwa | | Saw | 664 | 3.90 |
| G. M. M. Seneviratne | | Umbrella | 395 | 2.32 |
| Charles Amunugama | | Eye | 319 | 1.87 |
| G.H. Dharmapala | | Book | 288 | 1.69 |
| T.B. Wegodapola | | Ladder | 267 | 1.57 |
| Valid Votes | | | 16,797 | 98.62 |
| Rejected Votes | | | 235 | 1.38 |
| Total Polled | | | 17,032 | 100.00 |
| Registered Electors | | | 21,601 | |
| Turnout | | | | 78.85 |

=== 1960 (July) Parliamentary General Election ===
Results of the 5th parliamentary election held on 20 July 1960:

| Candidate | Party | Symbol | Votes | % |
|---|---|---|---|---|
| Chandrasena Munaweera | Sri Lanka Freedom Party | Hand | 8,589 | 50.14 |
| V. T. Nanayakkara | United National Party | Elephant | 6,710 | 39.17 |
| A. Bindusara | Mahajana Eksath Peramuna | Cartwheel | 1,288 | 7.52 |
| D. Piyumasinghe Yapa | | Ladder | 410 | 2.39 |
| Valid Votes | | | 16,997 | 99.22 |
| Rejected Votes | | | 133 | 0.78 |
| Total Polled | | | 17,130 | 100.00 |
| Registered Electors | | | 21,601 | |
| Turnout | | | | 79.30 |

=== 1965 Parliamentary General Election ===
Results of the 6th parliamentary election held on 22 March 1965:

| Candidate | Party | Symbol | Votes | % |
|---|---|---|---|---|
| S. B. Yalegama | Sri Lanka Freedom Party | Hand | 10,481 | 44.56 |
| Chandrasena Munaweera | Sri Lanka Freedom Socialist Party | Sun | 9,363 | 39.81 |
| S. W. Alawathuwala | | Eye | 3,322 | 14.12 |
| Valid Votes | | | 23,166 | 98.49 |
| Rejected Votes | | | 356 | 1.51 |
| Total Polled | | | 23,522 | 100.00 |
| Registered Electors | | | 27,939 | |
| Turnout | | | | 84.19 |

=== 1970 Parliamentary General Election ===
Results of the 7th parliamentary election held on 27 May 1970:

| Candidate | Party | Symbol | Votes | % |
|---|---|---|---|---|
| S. B. Yalegama | Sri Lanka Freedom Party | Hand | 16,039 | 57.71 |
| Chandrasena Munaweera | United National Party | Elephant | 11,536 | 41.51 |
| Valid Votes | | | 27,575 | 99.21 |
| Rejected Votes | | | 219 | 0.79 |
| Total Polled | | | 27,794 | 100.00 |
| Registered Electors | | | 31,422 | |
| Turnout | | | | 88.45 |

=== 1977 Parliamentary General Election ===
Results of the 8th parliamentary election held on 21 July 1977:

| Candidate | Party | Symbol | Votes | % |
|---|---|---|---|---|
| P. B. Kaviratne | United National Party | Elephant | 22,513 | 66.37 |
| S. B. Yalegama | Sri Lanka Freedom Party | Hand | 10,478 | 30.89 |
| Senaka Ellawala | | Star | 437 | 1.29 |
| L. M. Perera | | Lamp | 253 | 0.75 |
| Ukkubanda Tennakoon | Mahajana Eksath Peramuna | Cartwheel | 159 | 0.47 |
| I. G. Jayawickrema Rupasinghe | | Flower | 78 | 0.23 |
| Valid Votes | | | 33,731 | 99.45 |
| Rejected Votes | | | 187 | 0.55 |
| Total Polled | | | 33,918 | 100.00 |
| Registered Electors | | | 38,740 | |
| Turnout | | | | 87.55 |
