= Matale Electoral District (1947–1989) =

Electoral district of Sri Lanka

Matale electoral district was an electoral district of Sri Lanka between August 1947 and February 1989. The district was named after the town of Matale in Matale District, Central Province. The 1978 Constitution of Sri Lanka introduced the proportional representation electoral system for electing members of Parliament. The existing 160 mainly single-member electoral districts were replaced with 22 multi-member electoral districts. Matale electoral district was replaced by the Matale multi-member electoral district at the 1989 general elections, the first under the PR system, though Matale continues to be a polling division of the multi-member electoral district.

== Members of Parliament ==
Key

Independent SLFP UNP

Election	Member	Party	Term
1947	V. T. Nanayakkara		1947-1952
1952	Bernard Aluwihare	United National Party	1952-1956
1956	Nimal Karunatilake	Sri Lanka Freedom Party	1956-1960
1960 (March)	Bernard Aluwihare	United National Party	1960-1965
1960 (July)	Bernard Aluwihare	United National Party	1960-1965
1965	Alick Aluwihare	United National Party	1965-1970
1970	Richard Udugama	Sri Lanka Freedom Party	1970-1977
1977	Alick Aluwihare	United National Party	1977-1989

== Elections ==
=== 1947 Parliamentary General Election ===
Results of the 1st parliamentary election held between 23 August 1947 and 20 September 1947:

Candidate	Party	Symbol	Votes	%
V. T. Nanayakkara		Eye	11,530	48.62
Bernard Aluwihare		Star	9,525	40.12
T. B. Wegodapola		Lamp	2,373	10.01
Valid Votes			23,428	98.80
Rejected Votes			285	1.20
Total Polled			23,713	100.00
Registered Electors			37,847	
Turnout				62.65

=== 1952 Parliamentary General Election ===
Results of the 2nd parliamentary election held between 24 May 1952 and 30 May 1952 for the district:

Candidate	Party	Symbol	Votes	%
Bernard Aluwihare		Flower	12,314	57.43
V. T. Nanayakkara		House	8,898	41.95%
Valid Votes			21,212	98.93
Rejected Votes			229	1.07
Total Polled			21,441	100.00
Registered Electors			29,272	
Turnout				73.25

=== 1956 Parliamentary General Election ===
Results of the 3rd parliamentary election held between 5 April 1956 and 10 April 1956:

Candidate	Party	Symbol	Votes	%
Nimal Karunatilake	Sri Lanka Freedom Party	Hand	12,968	55.15
Bernard Aluwihare	United National Party	Elephant	10,372	44.11
Valid Votes			23,340	99.26
Rejected Votes			175	0.74
Total Polled			23,515	100.00
Registered Electors			33,081	
Turnout				71.08

=== 1960 (March) Parliamentary General Election ===
Results of the 4th parliamentary election held on 19 March 1960:

Candidate	Party	Symbol	Votes	%
Bernard Aluwihare	United National Party	Elephant	8,022	49.99
T. D. Gunaratne	Sri Lanka Freedom Party	Hand	6,113	38.97
M. B. Ratnayake	Mahajana Eksath Peramuna	Cart Wheel	892	5.56
S. B. Wijeratne	Communist Party	Star	504	3.14
A. K. Sumanapala		Umbrella	154	0.96
Jinadasa Wickremasuriya		Sun	117	0.73
Upali Monaravila Keppetipola		Clock	113	0.70
Valid Votes			15,915	99.18
Rejected Votes			131	0.82
Total Polled			16,046	100.00
Registered Electors			20,739	
Turnout				77.37

=== 1960 (July) Parliamentary General Election ===
Results of the 5th parliamentary election held on 20 July 1960:

Candidate	Party	Symbol	Votes	%
Bernard Aluwihare	United National Party	Elephant	8,961	54.13
T. D. Gunaratne	Sri Lanka Freedom Party	Hand	7,489	45.24
Valid Votes			16,450	99.37
Rejected Votes			105	0.63
Total Polled			16,555	100.00
Registered Electors			20,739	
Turnout				79.83%

=== 1965 Parliamentary General Election ===
Results of the 6th parliamentary election held on 22 March 1965:

Candidate	Party	Symbol	Votes	%
Alick Aluwihare	United National Party	Elephant	13,502	59.38
W. Dorakumbura	Sri Lanka Freedom Party	Hand	9,025	39.70
Valid Votes			22,527	99.07
Rejected Votes			212	0.93
Total Polled			22,739	100.00
Registered Electors			27,414	
Turnout				82.95

=== 1970 Parliamentary General Election ===
Results of the 7th parliamentary election held on 27 May 1970:

Candidate	Party	Symbol	Votes	%
Richard Udugama	Sri Lanka Freedom Party	Hand	13,428	51.01
Alick Aluwihare	United National Party	Elephant	12,778	48.54
Valid Votes			26,206	99.54
Rejected Votes			120	0.46
Total Polled			26,326	100.00
Registered Electors			30,396	
Turnout				86.61

=== 1977 Parliamentary General Election ===
Results of the 8th parliamentary election held on 21 July 1977 for the district:

Candidate	Party	Symbol	Votes	%
Alick Aluwihare	United National Party	Elephant	21,945	69.66
Chandrasena Munaweera	Sri Lanka Freedom Party	Hand	9,039	28.69
R. G. Karunaratne		Eye	361	1.15
Valid Votes			31,345	99.50
Rejected Votes			156	0.50
Total Polled			31,501	100.00
Registered Electors			36,395	
Turnout				86.55
