= Kegalle Polling Division =

Kegalle
- Polling Division
- Interactive map of Kegalle
- Coordinates: 7.214683°N 80.376448°E
- Country: Sri Lanka
- Province: Sabaragamuwa Province, Sri Lanka
- Electoral District: Kegalle Electoral District

Area
  - Total: 111.89 km^{2} (43.20 sq mi)

Population (2012)
  - Total: 90,854
  - Density: 812/km^{2} (2,100/sq mi)
- ISO 3166 code: EC-22C

The Kegalle Polling Division is a Polling Division in the Kegalle Electoral District, in the Sabaragamuwa Province, Sri Lanka.

== Presidential Election Results ==
=== Summary ===
The winner of Kegalle has matched the final country result 6 out of 8 times. Hence, Kegalle is a Weak Bellwether for Presidential Elections.

Year	Kegalle	Kegalle Electoral District	MAE %	Sri Lanka	MAE %
2019	SLPP	SLPP	5.92%	SLPP	8.65%
2015	UPFA	UPFA	3.60%	NDF	7.78%
2010	UPFA	UPFA	4.71%	UPFA	8.46%
2005	UPFA	UPFA	5.48%	UPFA	6.21%
1999	PA	PA	4.03%	PA	3.94%
1994	PA	PA	5.89%	PA	0.27%
1988	SLFP	UNP	8.18%	UNP	2.75%
1982	UNP	UNP	2.21%	UNP	1.38%
Matches/Mean MAE	6/8	7/8	5.00%	8/8	4.93%

=== 2019 Sri Lankan Presidential Election ===
Party	Kegalle		Kegalle Electoral District		Sri Lanka	
Party	Votes	%	Votes	%	Votes	%
SLPP	36,109	61.52%	320,484	55.66%	6,924,255	52.25%
NDF	19,341	32.95%	228,032	39.60%	5,564,239	41.99%
NMPP	2,032	3.46%	15,043	2.61%	418,553	3.16%
Other Parties (with < 1%)	1,212	2.06%	12,272	2.13%	345,452	2.61%
Valid Votes	58,694	98.95%	575,831	99.11%	13,252,499	98.99%
Rejected Votes	625	1.05%	5,152	0.89%	135,452	1.01%
Total Polled	59,319	85.38%	580,983	85.89%	13,387,951	83.71%
Registered Electors	69,473		676,440		15,992,568	

=== 2015 Sri Lankan Presidential Election ===
Party	Kegalle		Kegalle Electoral District		Sri Lanka	
Party	Votes	%	Votes	%	Votes	%
UPFA	30,452	55.54%	278,130	51.82%	5,768,090	47.58%
NDF	23,853	43.51%	252,533	47.05%	6,217,162	51.28%
Other Parties (with < 1%)	522	0.95%	6,108	1.14%	138,200	1.14%
Valid Votes	54,827	98.86%	536,771	98.80%	12,123,452	98.85%
Rejected Votes	630	1.14%	6,515	1.20%	140,925	1.15%
Total Polled	55,457	77.91%	543,286	79.85%	12,264,377	78.69%
Registered Electors	71,183		680,414		15,585,942	

=== 2010 Sri Lankan Presidential Election ===
Party	Kegalle		Kegalle Electoral District		Sri Lanka	
Party	Votes	%	Votes	%	Votes	%
UPFA	33,129	66.69%	296,639	61.80%	6,015,934	57.88%
NDF	15,791	31.79%	174,877	36.44%	4,173,185	40.15%
Other Parties (with < 1%)	754	1.52%	8,448	1.76%	204,494	1.97%
Valid Votes	49,674	99.26%	479,964	99.25%	10,393,613	99.03%
Rejected Votes	372	0.74%	3,604	0.75%	101,838	0.97%
Total Polled	50,046	74.56%	483,568	76.11%	10,495,451	66.70%
Registered Electors	67,118		635,342		15,734,587	

=== 2005 Sri Lankan Presidential Election ===
Party	Kegalle		Kegalle Electoral District		Sri Lanka	
Party	Votes	%	Votes	%	Votes	%
UPFA	27,444	56.66%	239,184	51.02%	4,887,152	50.29%
UNP	20,451	42.22%	223,483	47.67%	4,706,366	48.43%
Other Parties (with < 1%)	543	1.12%	6,106	1.30%	123,521	1.27%
Valid Votes	48,438	99.14%	468,773	98.99%	9,717,039	98.88%
Rejected Votes	421	0.86%	4,795	1.01%	109,869	1.12%
Total Polled	48,859	76.64%	473,568	78.68%	9,826,908	69.51%
Registered Electors	63,755		601,872		14,136,979	

=== 1999 Sri Lankan Presidential Election ===
Party	Kegalle		Kegalle Electoral District		Sri Lanka	
Party	Votes	%	Votes	%	Votes	%
PA	23,670	54.74%	210,185	51.30%	4,312,157	51.12%
UNP	16,407	37.94%	176,376	43.05%	3,602,748	42.71%
JVP	2,314	5.35%	14,997	3.66%	343,927	4.08%
Other Parties (with < 1%)	849	1.96%	8,122	1.98%	176,679	2.09%
Valid Votes	43,240	97.91%	409,680	98.05%	8,435,754	97.69%
Rejected Votes	924	2.09%	8,136	1.95%	199,536	2.31%
Total Polled	44,164	74.75%	417,816	76.52%	8,635,290	72.17%
Registered Electors	59,084		546,038		11,965,536	

=== 1994 Sri Lankan Presidential Election ===
Party	Kegalle		Kegalle Electoral District		Sri Lanka	
Party	Votes	%	Votes	%	Votes	%
PA	24,126	62.16%	211,676	56.06%	4,709,205	62.28%
UNP	14,150	36.45%	159,707	42.30%	2,715,283	35.91%
Other Parties (with < 1%)	539	1.39%	6,209	1.64%	137,040	1.81%
Valid Votes	38,815	98.10%	377,592	98.14%	7,561,526	98.03%
Rejected Votes	751	1.90%	7,139	1.86%	151,706	1.97%
Total Polled	39,566	72.03%	384,731	74.84%	7,713,232	69.12%
Registered Electors	54,933		514,055		11,158,880	

=== 1988 Sri Lankan Presidential Election ===
Party	Kegalle		Kegalle Electoral District		Sri Lanka	
Party	Votes	%	Votes	%	Votes	%
SLFP	15,226	48.98%	119,769	40.54%	2,289,857	44.95%
UNP	15,167	48.79%	168,720	57.11%	2,569,199	50.43%
SLMP	694	2.23%	6,923	2.34%	235,701	4.63%
Valid Votes	31,087	98.50%	295,412	98.57%	5,094,754	98.24%
Rejected Votes	474	1.50%	4,277	1.43%	91,499	1.76%
Total Polled	31,561	65.46%	299,689	67.98%	5,186,256	55.87%
Registered Electors	48,217		440,836		9,283,143	

=== 1982 Sri Lankan Presidential Election ===
Party	Kegalle		Kegalle Electoral District		Sri Lanka	
Party	Votes	%	Votes	%	Votes	%
UNP	20,184	54.94%	195,444	57.02%	3,450,815	52.93%
SLFP	14,567	39.65%	126,538	36.92%	2,546,348	39.05%
JVP	1,506	4.10%	13,706	4.00%	273,428	4.19%
LSSP	384	1.05%	6,184	1.80%	58,531	0.90%
Other Parties (with < 1%)	94	0.26%	890	0.26%	190,929	2.93%
Valid Votes	36,735	98.81%	342,762	98.69%	6,520,156	98.78%
Rejected Votes	443	1.19%	4,537	1.31%	80,470	1.22%
Total Polled	37,178	82.35%	347,299	84.30%	6,600,626	80.15%
Registered Electors	45,146		411,994		8,235,358	

== Parliamentary Election Results ==
=== Summary ===
The winner of Kegalle has matched the final country result 5 out of 7 times. Hence, Kegalle is a Weak Bellwether for Parliamentary Elections.

Year	Kegalle	Kegalle Electoral District	MAE %	Sri Lanka	MAE %
2015	UPFA	UNP	4.70%	UNP	3.88%
2010	UPFA	UPFA	2.92%	UPFA	6.77%
2004	UPFA	UPFA	3.64%	UPFA	4.34%
2001	PA	UNP	4.63%	UNP	3.82%
2000	PA	PA	3.78%	PA	4.14%
1994	PA	UNP	7.30%	PA	3.15%
1989	UNP	UNP	5.55%	UNP	5.14%
Matches/Mean MAE	5/7	6/7	4.65%	7/7	4.46%

=== 2015 Sri Lankan Parliamentary Election ===
Party	Kegalle		Kegalle Electoral District		Sri Lanka	
Party	Votes	%	Votes	%	Votes	%
UPFA	25,562	49.88%	227,208	45.47%	4,732,664	42.48%
UNP	22,643	44.19%	247,467	49.52%	5,098,916	45.77%
JVP	2,587	5.05%	18,394	3.68%	544,154	4.88%
Other Parties (with < 1%)	453	0.88%	6,661	1.33%	101,045	0.91%
Valid Votes	51,245	96.89%	499,730	96.35%	11,140,333	95.35%
Rejected Votes	1,635	3.09%	18,770	3.62%	516,926	4.42%
Total Polled	52,889	74.30%	518,674	79.81%	11,684,111	77.66%
Registered Electors	71,183		649,878		15,044,490	

=== 2010 Sri Lankan Parliamentary Election ===
Party	Kegalle		Kegalle Electoral District		Sri Lanka	
Party	Votes	%	Votes	%	Votes	%
UPFA	25,513	69.33%	242,463	66.89%	4,846,388	60.38%
UNP	9,106	24.75%	104,925	28.95%	2,357,057	29.37%
DNA	2,061	5.60%	13,518	3.73%	441,251	5.50%
Other Parties (with < 1%)	117	0.32%	1,549	0.43%	33,973	0.42%
Valid Votes	36,797	94.34%	362,455	93.32%	8,026,322	96.03%
Rejected Votes	2,209	5.66%	25,965	6.68%	581,465	6.96%
Total Polled	39,006	58.12%	388,420	60.93%	8,358,246	59.29%
Registered Electors	67,118		637,524		14,097,690	

=== 2004 Sri Lankan Parliamentary Election ===
Party	Kegalle		Kegalle Electoral District		Sri Lanka	
Party	Votes	%	Votes	%	Votes	%
UPFA	23,778	53.67%	214,267	50.88%	4,223,126	45.70%
UNP	17,509	39.52%	186,641	44.32%	3,486,792	37.73%
JHU	2,834	6.40%	18,034	4.28%	552,723	5.98%
Other Parties (with < 1%)	186	0.42%	2,187	0.52%	59,247	0.64%
Valid Votes	44,307	95.11%	421,134	94.25%	9,241,931	94.52%
Rejected Votes	2,276	4.89%	25,685	5.75%	534,452	5.47%
Total Polled	46,583	74.46%	446,816	78.35%	9,777,821	75.74%
Registered Electors	62,561		570,299		12,909,631	

=== 2001 Sri Lankan Parliamentary Election ===
Party	Kegalle		Kegalle Electoral District		Sri Lanka	
Party	Votes	%	Votes	%	Votes	%
PA	19,454	43.34%	170,901	40.53%	3,330,815	37.19%
UNP	19,242	42.87%	208,104	49.36%	4,086,026	45.62%
JVP	5,415	12.06%	36,711	8.71%	815,353	9.10%
Other Parties (with < 1%)	778	1.73%	5,924	1.40%	123,245	1.38%
Valid Votes	44,889	95.62%	421,640	94.90%	8,955,844	94.77%
Rejected Votes	2,057	4.38%	22,669	5.10%	494,009	5.23%
Total Polled	46,946	76.55%	444,309	80.10%	9,449,878	76.03%
Registered Electors	61,325		554,698		12,428,762	

=== 2000 Sri Lankan Parliamentary Election ===
Party	Kegalle		Kegalle Electoral District		Sri Lanka	
Party	Votes	%	Votes	%	Votes	%
PA	22,237	51.64%	201,114	48.88%	3,899,329	45.33%
UNP	16,091	37.37%	175,627	42.69%	3,451,765	40.12%
JVP	3,509	8.15%	22,028	5.35%	518,725	6.03%
SU	740	1.72%	4,549	1.11%	127,859	1.49%
Other Parties (with < 1%)	486	1.13%	8,094	1.97%	291,648	3.39%
Valid Votes	43,063	N/A	411,412	N/A	8,602,617	N/A

=== 1994 Sri Lankan Parliamentary Election ===
Party	Kegalle		Kegalle Electoral District		Sri Lanka	
Party	Votes	%	Votes	%	Votes	%
PA	23,084	55.04%	190,689	47.91%	3,887,805	48.94%
UNP	18,311	43.66%	203,938	51.24%	3,498,370	44.04%
SLPF	543	1.29%	3,383	0.85%	90,078	1.13%
Valid Votes	41,938	96.27%	398,010	95.89%	7,943,688	95.20%
Rejected Votes	1,624	3.73%	17,043	4.11%	400,395	4.80%
Total Polled	43,562	79.30%	415,053	80.78%	8,344,095	74.75%
Registered Electors	54,933		513,825		11,163,064	

=== 1989 Sri Lankan Parliamentary Election ===
Party	Kegalle		Kegalle Electoral District		Sri Lanka	
Party	Votes	%	Votes	%	Votes	%
UNP	16,984	56.98%	174,334	61.12%	2,838,005	50.71%
SLFP	11,304	37.93%	80,668	28.28%	1,785,369	31.90%
USA	685	2.30%	15,168	5.32%	141,983	2.54%
ELJP	680	2.28%	14,056	4.93%	67,723	1.21%
Other Parties (with < 1%)	153	0.51%	1,028	0.36%	90,480	1.62%
Valid Votes	29,806	94.64%	285,254	93.95%	5,596,468	93.87%
Rejected Votes	1,689	5.36%	18,362	6.05%	365,563	6.13%
Total Polled	31,495	67.26%	303,616	69.46%	5,962,031	63.60%
Registered Electors	46,828		437,131		9,374,164	

== Demographics ==
=== Ethnicity ===
The Kegalle Polling Division has a Sinhalese majority (95.8%) . In comparison, the Kegalle Electoral District (which contains the Kegalle Polling Division) has a Sinhalese majority (85.5%)

Ethnicity in Kegalle
1. Sinhalese (95.8%)
2. Indian Tamil (1.90%)
3. Moor (1.20%)
4. Other (1.00%)

=== Religion ===
The Kegalle Polling Division has a Buddhist majority (94.0%) . In comparison, the Kegalle Electoral District (which contains the Kegalle Polling Division) has a Buddhist majority (84.4%)

Religion in Kegalle
1. Buddhist (94.0%)
2. Hindu (2.20%)
3. Roman Catholic (1.70%)
4. Muslim (1.40%)
5. Other (0.70%)
