= Kegalle Electoral District (1947–1989) =

Electoral district of Sri Lanka

Kegalle electoral district was an electoral district of Sri Lanka between August 1947 and February 1989. The district was named after the city of Kegalle in Kegalle District, Sabaragamuwa Province. The 1978 Constitution of Sri Lanka introduced the proportional representation electoral system for electing members of Parliament. The existing 160 mainly single-member electoral districts were replaced with 22 multi-member electoral districts. Kegalle electoral district was replaced by the Kegalle multi-member electoral district at the 1989 general elections, the first under the proportional representation system, Kegalle continues to be a polling division of the multi-member electoral district.

== Members of Parliament ==
Key

Independent SLFP UNP

Election	Member	Party	Term
1947	N. H. Keerthiratne	UNP	
1952	N. H. Keerthiratne	UNP	
1956	P. B. G. Kalugalla	SLFP	
1960 (March)	P. B. G. Kalugalla	SLFP	
1960 (July)	P. B. G. Kalugalla	SLFP	
1965	P. B. G. Kalugalla	SLFP	
1970	P. B. G. Kalugalla	SLFP	
1977	N. A. Seneviratne	UNP	

== Elections ==
=== 1947 Parliamentary General Election ===
Results of the 1st parliamentary election held between 23 August 1947 and 20 September 1947 for the district:

Candidate	Party	Symbol	Votes	%
N. H. Keerthiratne		Elephant	14,550	66.28
R. V. Dedigama		Key	7,059	32.16
Valid Votes			21,609	98.44
Rejected Votes			343	1.56
Total Polled			21,952	100.00
Registered Electors			41,791	
Turnout				52.053

=== 1952 Parliamentary General Election ===
Results of the 2nd parliamentary election held between 24 May 1952 and 30 May 1952 for the district:

Candidate	Party	Symbol	Votes	%
N. H. Keerthiratne		Star	16,443	64.36
Lionel Samarakkody		Hand	8,358	32.71
K. A. Siriratne		Elephant	403	1.58
Valid Votes			25,208	98.67
Rejected Votes			341	1.33
Total Polled			25,549	100.00
Registered Electors			35,428	
Turnout				72.12

=== 1956 Parliamentary General Election ===
Results of the 3rd parliamentary election held between 5 April 1956 and 10 April 1956 for the district:

Candidate	Party	Symbol	Votes	%
P. B. G. Kalugalla	Sri Lanka Freedom Party	Hand	21,754	73.66
Winston Wickremasinghe	United National Party	Elephant	8,830	29.90
Valid Votes			28,271	99.12
Rejected Votes			260	0.88
Total Polled			29,531	100.00
Registered Electors			39,972	
Turnout				73.88

=== 1960 (March) Parliamentary General Election ===
Results of the 4th parliamentary election held on 19 March 1960 for the district:

Candidate	Party	Symbol	Votes	%
P. B. G. Kalugalla	Sri Lanka Freedom Party	Hand	10,572	48.25
N. H. Keerthiratne	United National Party	Elephant	8,964	40.91
Stephen Perera		Key	1,064	4.86
Tissa Wijeratne		Star	653	2.98
Herbert Vithanage		Lamp	182	0.83
H. Dharmasiri Fonseka		Umbrella	177	0.81
K. A. Vincent Perera		Pair of Scales	144	0.66
Valid Votes			21,756	99.30
Rejected Votes			154	0.70
Total Polled			21,910	100.00
Registered Electors			26,829	
Turnout				81.67

=== 1960 (July) Parliamentary General Election ===
Results of the 5th parliamentary election held on 20 July 1960 for the district:

Candidate	Party	Symbol	Votes	%
P. B. G. Kalugalla	Sri Lanka Freedom Party	Hand	11,741	54.17
N. H. Keerthiratne	United National Party	Elephant	9,847	45.43
Valid Votes			21,588	99.60
Rejected Votes			87	0.40
Total Polled			21,675	100.00
Registered Electors			26,829	
Turnout				80.79

=== 1965 Parliamentary General Election ===
Results of the 6th parliamentary election held on 22 March 1965 for the district:

Candidate	Party	Symbol	Votes	%
P. B. G. Kalugalla	Sri Lanka Freedom Party	Hand	15,644	53.67
Nimal Karunatilake	United National Party	Elephant	13,283	45.57
Valid Votes			28,927	99.23
Rejected Votes			224	0.77
Total Polled			29,151	100.00
Registered Electors			34,451	
Turnout				84.62

=== 1970 Parliamentary General Election ===
Results of the 7th parliamentary election held on 27 May 1970 for the district:

Candidate	Party	Symbol	Votes	%
P. B. G. Kalugalla	Sri Lanka Freedom Party	Hand	21,009	63.13
N. A. Seneviratne	United National Party	Elephant	11,977	35.99
M. Athurupana		Bell	239	0.72
Valid Votes			33,225	99.83
Rejected Votes			56	0.17
Total Polled			33,281	100.00
Registered Electors			38,206	
Turnout				87.11

=== 1977 Parliamentary General Election ===
Results of the 8th parliamentary election held on 21 July 1977 for the district:

Candidate	Party	Symbol	Votes	%
N. A. Seneviratne	United National Party	Elephant	17,403	51.43
P. B. G. Kalugalla	Sri Lanka Freedom Party	Hand	15,339	45.33
P. M. G. Wijesuriya		Key	1,021	3.02
Valid Votes			33,763	99.78
Rejected Votes			75	0.22
Total Polled			33,838	100.00
Registered Electors			38,396	
Turnout				88.13
