= V. T. Nanayakkara =

Sri Lankan politician

Vithanage Tergin Nanayakkara (born 5 January 1902) was a Ceylonese politician.

Nanayakkara received his education at Richmond College, Galle, where he was an accomplished sportsman and the vice captain of the school's cricket team in 1921. He served as the principal of the Vijaya College in Matale.

Nanayakkara was elected as an independent member at the 1st parliamentary election, held between 23 August 1947 and 20 September 1947, representing the Matale electorate, where he received 11,530 votes (48.62% of the total vote), with his nearest rival, Bernard Aluwihare receiving 9,525 votes (40.17%). During his parliamentary tenure Nanayakkara arranged for the donation of 4.5 ha (11 acres) of land in Matale upon which Government Science College was established.

In 1952 he contested the 2nd parliamentary election, as the sitting member for Matale representing the United National Party, but was defeated by Bernard Aluwihare, who polled 12,314 votes (57.43%) to Nanayakkara's 8,898 votes (41.5%).
