= Gondeniya =

Gondeniya Sinhala: ගොන්දෙණිය
- Village
- Interactive map of Gondeniya
- Country: Sri Lanka
- Province: Central Province
- Time zone: UTC+5:30 (Sri Lanka Standard Time)

Gondeniya (Sinhala: ගොන්දෙණිය) is a village in Sri Lanka. It is located within Central Province.

== See also ==
- List of towns in Central Province, Sri Lanka
