= Yahalatenna =

Coordinates: 7°19′N 80°35′E

- Village
- Interactive map of Yahalatenna
- Country: Sri Lanka
- Province: Central Province
- Time zone: UTC+5:30 (Sri Lanka Standard Time)

Yahalatenna is a village in Sri Lanka. It is located within Central Province.

== See also ==
- List of towns in Central Province, Sri Lanka
