= S. B. Yalegama =

Sri Lankan politician (1925–1988)

Manamperi Mudiyanselage Samararatna Bandara Yalegama (16 October 1925 – 28 May 1988) was a Sri Lankan politician. He was the member of Parliament of Sri Lanka from Rattota representing the Sri Lanka Freedom Party.

He was elected to parliament from Rattota in the 1965 general election, defeating Chandrasena Munaweera and retained his seat in the 1970 general election, but lost it in the 1977 general election.

He was assassinated on 28 May 1988 by an unknown gunman during the 1987–1989 JVP insurrection. Five days following his death, he won the 1988 central provincial council election obtaining 12068 votes in the Matale district.
