= Zahira College, Gampola =

Coordinates: 7.17044°N 80.57116°E

Gampola Zahira College, Gampola
- Gampola; Sri Lanka

Information
- Type: Public School
- Motto: Through faith and Knowledge, Seek Salvation
- Established: 15 May 1942
- Founder: T. B. Jayah
- School district: Kandy
- Grades: 1–13
- Gender: Coeducational
- Age: 6 to 19
- Enrollment: 3500
- Language: English, Sinhala and Tamil
- Athletics: All kind of track and field events
- Sports: Football and Cricket
- Alumni: Old Zahirians

Gampola Zahira College, Gampola (commonly known as Gampola Zahira or simply as Zahira) (Sinhala: ගම්පොල සහිරා විද්‍යාලය, Tamil: கம்பளை சாஹிரா கல்லூரி, Arabic: Zahira means "Excellence") is a co-educational college in Gampola, Central Province, Sri Lanka.

Students can study in any of the nation's three official languages.

Government syllabus classes are available from grade 1 to A/L's educating 3,500 students. The school attracts students from across the country.

== History ==
Japan bombed Colombo in 1942, causing pandemonium across the country. All work came to a stand-still. Schools were closed and people started running away from Colombo seeking a safe haven. The Muslim business fraternity sought refuge in the central hill country.

Zahira College Colombo was the prime Muslim institution where religious education was imparted. Muslim parents who sought refuge in hill country faced a dilemma as at the period no Muslim school operated in the central province, although other schools were available.

Tuan Burhanudeen Jayah communicated with M. S. Seyed Mohamed, the main trustee of Gampola town masjidh, and M. S. N. Omer Batcha to open a branch of Zahira in Gampola. They purchased 8.5 acres (3.4 ha) and a small thatched roof hut was built to house Muslim students. This became Zahira College, Gampola on 15 May 1942 with four teachers, enrolling 185 students. Rauff Pasha was the first vice-principal. After the end of the war students from Colombo returned home and enrollment fell to 67. The college was run by the T. B Jayah along with the two trustees of Gampola Musjidh.

The first Vice-Principal was professor Seyed Rauf Pasha who transferred from Zahira College, Colombo. Maulavi Y. M Haneef Nadavi taught teach Arabic and Kanagasabapathy Pillai taught Tamil. Meera Saibo joined the staff. Pasha on weekends used to take a few senior students and canvassing villages for new students.

As the enrollment increased, more classrooms with permanent buildings were needed. The managing committee pushed for a permanent managing body. N. S. Dawood funded and erected the present day Dawood classroom block. Hajee N. D. H Abdul Caffor and S. Mohamde Macan Marikar funded a science block. B. Mahmood enlisted A. L. M. Hashim, Justice Abdul Cader, and M. Sultan to teach special subjects and instill discipline.

Al-Haj Dr. Badi-ud-din Mahmud was appointed as vice-principal and became principal in 1945. His tenure was 16 years until he became national Education Minister in 1970.

With his support as Education Minister the school grew to 26 acres (11 ha) and 26 new buildings including a three-story building, auditorium, dental clinic, Advance Level (A/L) science and home science laboratories, and a Mosque.

The school offers grade 13 technical-vocational study classes to those who do not pass the G.C.E. (O/L) examination

The school was promoted to the level of a national school on 19 February 1988. Its 75th anniversary was celebrated on 15 May 2017.

== Alumni ==
- W. M. P. B. Dissanayake - Chief Minister of the Central Province of Sri Lanka from Jun 1988 to Jun 1998 and again from Apr 2002 to 29 May 2003.
- D. M. Jayaratne - Prime Minister of Sri Lanka - 21 April 2010 – 9 January 2015
- Mohamed Najeeb Abdul Majeed - former Member of Parliament and former Chief Minister of Eastern Province
- Imthiaz Bakeer Markar - politician, Chairman of the National Media Centre, and former Cabinet Minister
- Ferial Ashraff - former Minister of Housing and High Commissioner to Singapore
