= Haliyadda =

- Towb
- Interactive map of Haliyadda
- Coordinates: 7°16′22″N 80°32′6″E
- Country: Sri Lanka
- Province: Central Province
- District: Kandy
- DS Division: Medadumbara Divisional Secretariat
- Time zone: UTC+5:30 (Sri Lanka Standard Time)

Haliyadda is a village in Sri Lanka. It is located within the Kandy district of Central Province. It is 11.4 kilometres (7.1 miles) from Kandy, the capital of Central Province, and 85 kilometres (53 miles) from Colombo. The closest airport is Bandaranaike International Airport which is 73 kilometres (45 miles) to the west. The campaign of Danture took place 1.2 kilometres away (0.75 mi), and the sacred city of Kandy is another nearby historical site.

== See also ==
- List of towns in Central Province, Sri Lanka
