= Kahawatugoda =

Coordinates: 7°17′N 80°33′E

- Village
- Interactive map of Kahawatugoda
- Country: Sri Lanka
- Province: Central Province
- Time zone: UTC+5:30 (Sri Lanka Standard Time)

Kahawatugoda is a village with only peasants in Sri Lanka, within Central Province.

== See also ==
- List of towns in Central Province, Sri Lanka
