= Yatinuwara Polling Division =

Yatinuwara
- Polling Division
- Coordinates: 7.282388°N 80.545506°E
- Country: Sri Lanka
- Province: Central Province, Sri Lanka
- Electoral District: Kandy Electoral District

Area
  - Total: 70.75 km^{2} (27.32 sq mi)

Population (2012)
  - Total: 106,027
  - Density: 1,499/km^{2} (3,880/sq mi)
- ISO 3166 code: EC-04J

The Yatinuwara Polling Division is a Polling Division in the Kandy Electoral District, in the Central Province, Sri Lanka.

== Presidential election results ==
=== Summary ===
The winner of Yatinuwara has matched the final country result 7 out of 9 times. This makes Yatinuwara a weak bellwether for presidential elections.

Year	Yatinuwara	Kandy	MAE%	Sri Lanka	MAE%
2024	Dissanayake	Dissanayake	%	Dissanayake	%
2019	Rajapaksa	Rajapaksa	7.64%	Rajapaksa	5.49%
2015	Sirisena	Sirisena	3.44%	Sirisena	0.18%
2010	Rajapaksa	Rajapaksa	3.77%	Rajapaksa	0.20%
2005	Wickremesinghe	Wickremesinghe	4.62%	Rajapaksa	1.24%
1999	Kumaratunga	Kumaratunga	0.53%	Kumaratunga	2.01%
1994	Kumaratunga	Kumaratunga	1.12%	Kumaratunga	4.46%
1988	Bandaranaike	Premadasa	7.51%	Premadasa	4.57%
1982	Jayawardene	Jayawardene	7.06%	Jayawardene	2.40%
Matches/Mean MAE	7/9	8/9	4.46%	9/9	2.57%

=== 2024 Sri Lankan presidential election ===
Candidate	Yatinuwara		Kandy		Sri Lanka	
Candidate	Votes	%	Votes	%	Votes	%
Anura Kumara Dissanayake	32,909	48.98%	394,534	42.46%	5,634,915	42.31%
Sajith Premadasa	19,374	28.83%	323,998	34.71%	4,363,035	32.76%
Ranil Wickremesinghe	11,196	16.66%	162,707	17.43%	2,299,767	17.27%
Namal Rajapaksa	1,409	2.10%	19,403	2.08%	342,781	2.57%
Dilith Jayaweera	927	1.38%	9,098	0.97%	122,396	0.92%
Others	1,377	2.05%	23,776	2.55%	556,722	4.18%
Valid Votes	67,192	97.75%	933,516	97.48%	13,319,616	97.80%
Rejected Votes	1,550	2.25%	24,153	2.52%	300,300	2.20%
Total Polled	68,742	80.03%	957,669	80.38%	13,619,916	79.46%
Registered Electors	85,893		1,191,399		17,140,354	

=== 2019 Sri Lankan presidential election ===
Candidate	Yatinuwara		Kandy		Sri Lanka	
Candidate	Votes	%	Votes	%	Votes	%
Gotabaya Rajapaksa	38,765	58.32%	471,502	50.43%	6,924,255	52.25%
Sajith Premadasa	24,244	36.48%	417,355	44.64%	5,564,239	41.99%
Anura Kumara Dissanayake	2,021	3.04%	23,539	2.52%	418,553	3.16%
Others	1,434	2.16%	22,479	2.40%	345,452	2.61%
Valid Votes	66,464	99.13%	934,875	99.04%	13,252,499	98.99%
Rejected Votes	584	0.87%	9,020	0.96%	135,452	1.01%
Total Polled	67,048	84.37%	943,895	84.89%	13,387,951	83.71%
Registered Electors	79,471		1,111,860		15,992,568	

=== 2015 Sri Lankan presidential election ===
Candidate	Yatinuwara		Kandy		Sri Lanka	
Candidate	Votes	%	Votes	%	Votes	%
Maithripala Sirisena	32,298	51.19%	466,994	54.56%	6,217,162	51.28%
Mahinda Rajapaksa	30,194	47.86%	378,585	44.23%	5,768,090	47.58%
Others	597	0.95%	10,329	1.21%	138,200	1.14%
Valid Votes	63,089	98.83%	855,908	98.73%	12,123,452	98.85%
Rejected Votes	748	1.17%	10,993	1.27%	140,925	1.15%
Total Polled	63,837	79.38%	866,901	79.71%	12,264,377	78.69%
Registered Electors	80,420		1,087,542		15,585,942	

=== 2010 Sri Lankan presidential election ===
Candidate	Yatinuwara		Kandy		Sri Lanka	
Candidate	Votes	%	Votes	%	Votes	%
Mahinda Rajapaksa	33,664	58.16%	406,636	54.16%	6,015,934	57.88%
Sarath Fonseka	23,290	40.24%	329,492	43.89%	4,173,185	40.15%
Others	927	1.60%	14,658	1.95%	204,494	1.97%
Valid Votes	57,881	99.13%	750,786	98.85%	10,393,613	99.03%
Rejected Votes	506	0.87%	8,700	1.15%	101,838	0.97%
Total Polled	58,387	75.83%	759,486	75.87%	10,495,451	66.70%
Registered Electors	76,996		1,001,074		15,734,587	

=== 2005 Sri Lankan presidential election ===
Candidate	Yatinuwara		Kandy		Sri Lanka	
Candidate	Votes	%	Votes	%	Votes	%
Ranil Wickremesinghe	27,791	49.69%	387,150	54.33%	4,706,366	48.43%
Mahinda Rajapaksa	27,428	49.04%	315,672	44.30%	4,887,152	50.29%
Others	715	1.28%	9,798	1.37%	123,521	1.27%
Valid Votes	55,934	98.95%	712,620	98.64%	9,717,039	98.88%
Rejected Votes	594	1.05%	9,817	1.36%	109,869	1.12%
Total Polled	56,528	78.15%	722,437	77.37%	9,826,908	69.51%
Registered Electors	72,329		933,754		14,136,979	

=== 1999 Sri Lankan presidential election ===
Candidate	Yatinuwara		Kandy		Sri Lanka	
Candidate	Votes	%	Votes	%	Votes	%
Chandrika Kumaratunga	23,135	49.65%	308,187	50.29%	4,312,157	51.12%
Ranil Wickremesinghe	21,219	45.54%	276,360	45.10%	3,602,748	42.71%
Nandana Gunathilake	1,293	2.78%	15,512	2.53%	343,927	4.08%
Others	945	2.03%	12,752	2.08%	176,679	2.09%
Valid Votes	46,592	96.95%	612,811	97.29%	8,435,754	97.69%
Rejected Votes	1,464	3.05%	17,060	2.71%	199,536	2.31%
Total Polled	48,056	76.59%	629,871	77.61%	8,635,290	72.17%
Registered Electors	62,747		811,606		11,965,536	

=== 1994 Sri Lankan presidential election ===
Candidate	Yatinuwara		Kandy		Sri Lanka	
Candidate	Votes	%	Votes	%	Votes	%
Chandrika Kumaratunga	25,099	57.83%	320,110	56.64%	4,709,205	62.28%
Srima Dissanayake	17,621	40.60%	235,519	41.68%	2,715,283	35.91%
Others	679	1.56%	9,488	1.68%	137,040	1.81%
Valid Votes	43,399	97.89%	565,117	97.55%	7,561,526	98.03%
Rejected Votes	934	2.11%	14,179	2.45%	151,706	1.97%
Total Polled	44,333	75.84%	579,296	77.85%	7,713,232	69.12%
Registered Electors	58,455		744,151		11,158,880	

=== 1988 Sri Lankan presidential election ===
Candidate	Yatinuwara		Kandy		Sri Lanka	
Candidate	Votes	%	Votes	%	Votes	%
Sirimavo Bandaranaike	15,699	51.15%	186,187	43.65%	2,289,857	44.95%
Ranasinghe Premadasa	14,478	47.17%	234,124	54.88%	2,569,199	50.43%
Ossie Abeygunasekera	515	1.68%	6,266	1.47%	235,701	4.63%
Valid Votes	30,692	98.83%	426,577	98.57%	5,094,754	98.24%
Rejected Votes	362	1.17%	6,167	1.43%	91,499	1.76%
Total Polled	31,054	59.51%	432,744	68.36%	5,186,256	55.87%
Registered Electors	52,182		633,030		9,283,143	

=== 1982 Sri Lankan presidential election ===
Candidate	Yatinuwara		Kandy		Sri Lanka	
Candidate	Votes	%	Votes	%	Votes	%
J. R. Jayewardene	20,848	52.66%	289,621	59.80%	3,450,815	52.93%
Hector Kobbekaduwa	17,596	44.45%	178,647	36.89%	2,546,348	39.05%
Rohana Wijeweera	964	2.43%	12,493	2.58%	273,428	4.19%
Others	182	0.46%	3,536	0.73%	249,460	3.83%
Valid Votes	39,590	99.19%	484,297	99.07%	6,520,156	98.78%
Rejected Votes	325	0.81%	4,548	0.93%	80,470	1.22%
Total Polled	39,915	85.41%	488,845	89.44%	6,600,626	80.15%
Registered Electors	46,731		546,565		8,235,358	

== Parliamentary election results ==
=== Summary ===
The winner of Yatinuwara has matched the final national result in 8 out of 8 parliamentary elections. This suggests that Yatnuwara has been a strong bellwether constituency in parliamentary elections.

Year	Yatinuwara	Kandy	MAE %	Sri Lanka	MAE %
2020	SLPFA	SLPFA	%	SLPFA	%
2015	UNFGG	UNFGG	4.39%	UNFGG	2.69%
2010	UPFA	UPFA	0.47%	UPFA	1.88%
2004	UPFA	UNF	3.80%	UPFA	3.00%
2001	UNF	UNF	2.06%	UNF	3.79%
2000	PA	PA	1.62%	PA	1.58%
1994	PA	UNP	4.56%	PA	2.55%
1989	UNP	UNP	8.29%	UNP	4.79%
Matches/Mean MAE	8/8	6/8	3.60%	8/8	2.90%

=== 2020 Sri Lankan parliamentary election ===
Party	Yatinuwara		Kandy		Sri Lanka	
Party	Votes	%	Votes	%	Votes	%
SLPFA	38,839	67.12%	477,446	58.76%	6,853,690	59.09%
SJB	12,532	21.66%	234,523	28.86%	2,771,980	23.90%
IG-1	2,000	3.46%	25,797	3.17%	25,797	0.22%
NPP	1,831	3.16%	22,997	2.83%	445,958	3.84%
UNP	1,257	2.17%	19,012	2.34%	249,435	2.15%
Others	1,404	2.43%	12,055	1.52%	1,174,336	10.35%
Valid Votes	57,863	96.58%	812,578	94.94%	11,598,929	93.97%
Rejected Votes	2,779	3.42%	57,091	5.06%	744,373	6.03%
Total Polled	60,642	74.30%	869,669	77.02%	12,343,302	75.89%
Registered Electors	81,284		1,129,100		16,263,885	

=== 2015 Sri Lankan parliamentary election ===
Party	Yatinuwara		Kandy		Sri Lanka	
Party	Votes	%	Votes	%	Votes	%
UNFGG	29,310	50.84%	440,761	55.61%	5,098,916	45.77%
UPFA	24,986	43.34%	309,152	39.00%	4,732,664	42.48%
JVP	2,823	4.90%	30,669	3.87%	544,154	4.88%
Others	534	0.93%	12,055	1.52%	100,088	0.90%
Valid Votes	57,653	96.49%	792,637	95.48%	11,140,333	95.35%
Rejected Votes	2,067	3.46%	37,065	4.46%	516,926	4.42%
Total Polled	59,753	74.30%	830,165	79.13%	11,684,111	77.66%
Registered Electors	80,420		1,049,160		15,044,490	

=== 2010 Sri Lankan parliamentary election ===
Party	Yatinuwara		Kandy		Sri Lanka	
Party	Votes	%	Votes	%	Votes	%
UPFA	26,419	61.21%	339,819	60.81%	4,846,388	60.38%
UNF	14,621	33.88%	192,798	34.50%	2,357,057	29.37%
DNA	1,983	4.59%	23,728	4.25%	441,251	5.50%
Others	137	0.32%	2,459	0.44%	30,354	0.38%
Valid Votes	43,160	91.75%	558,804	90.49%	8,026,322	96.03%
Rejected Votes	3,862	8.21%	58,333	9.45%	581,465	6.96%
Total Polled	47,041	61.10%	617,559	61.70%	8,358,246	59.29%
Registered Electors	76,996		1,000,861		14,097,690	

=== 2004 Sri Lankan parliamentary election ===
Party	Yatinuwara		Kandy		Sri Lanka	
Party	Votes	%	Votes	%	Votes	%
UPFA	22,887	45.60%	268,131	42.71%	4,223,126	45.70%
UNF	22,647	45.12%	313,859	49.99%	3,486,792	37.73%
JHU	4,376	8.72%	42,192	6.72%	552,723	5.98%
Others	282	0.56%	3,684	0.59%	64,227	0.69%
Valid Votes	50,192	95.32%	627,866	93.24%	9,241,931	94.52%
Rejected Votes	2,465	4.68%	45,484	6.75%	534,452	5.47%
Total Polled	52,657	75.23%	673,380	76.47%	9,777,821	75.74%
Registered Electors	69,992		880,634		12,909,631	

=== 2001 Sri Lankan parliamentary election ===
Party	Yatinuwara		Kandy		Sri Lanka	
Party	Votes	%	Votes	%	Votes	%
UNF	24,871	50.27%	314,297	52.77%	4,086,026	45.62%
PA	20,318	41.06%	233,637	39.23%	3,330,815	37.19%
JVP	3,243	6.55%	37,146	6.24%	815,353	9.10%
Others	1,047	2.12%	10,496	1.76%	129,347	1.45%
Valid Votes	49,479	95.17%	595,576	93.40%	8,955,844	94.77%
Rejected Votes	2,512	4.83%	42,103	6.60%	494,009	5.23%
Total Polled	51,991	78.16%	637,679	76.03%	9,449,878	76.03%
Registered Electors	66,518		838,687		12,428,762	

=== 2000 Sri Lankan parliamentary election ===
Party	Yatinuwara		Kandy		Sri Lanka	
Party	Votes	%	Votes	%	Votes	%
PA	21,793	45.95%	282,282	46.66%	3,899,329	45.33%
UNP	20,405	43.02%	243,623	40.27%	3,451,765	40.12%
JVP	2,082	4.39%	21,565	3.56%	518,725	6.03%
NUA	1,341	2.83%	32,023	5.29%	185,593	2.16%
SU	1,208	2.55%	10,999	1.82%	127,859	1.49%
Others	598	1.26%	14,436	2.39%	161,809	1.88%
Valid Votes	47,427	N/A	604,928	N/A	8,602,617	N/A

=== 1994 Sri Lankan parliamentary election ===
Party	Yatinuwara		Kandy		Sri Lanka	
Party	Votes	%	Votes	%	Votes	%
PA	23,096	50.91%	267,683	46.43%	3,887,805	48.94%
UNP	21,602	47.62%	301,824	52.35%	3,498,370	44.04%
Others	668	1.47%	7,045	1.22%	175,576	2.21%
Valid Votes	45,366	95.53%	576,552	94.89%	7,943,688	95.20%
Rejected Votes	2,122	4.47%	31,019	5.11%	400,395	4.80%
Total Polled	47,488	81.24%	607,571	81.67%	8,344,095	74.75%
Registered Electors	58,455		743,939		11,163,064	

=== 1989 Sri Lankan parliamentary election ===
Party	Yatinuwara		Kandy		Sri Lanka	
Party	Votes	%	Votes	%	Votes	%
UNP	11,064	53.66%	204,973	61.72%	2,838,005	50.71%
SLFP	8,661	42.00%	105,977	31.91%	1,785,369	31.90%
SLMC	500	2.42%	14,697	4.43%	202,016	3.61%
USA	334	1.62%	5,147	1.55%	141,983	2.54%
Others	61	0.30%	1,315	0.40%	67,723	1.21%
Valid Votes	20,620	95.10%	332,109	93.69%	5,596,468	93.87%
Rejected Votes	1,062	4.90%	22,374	6.31%	365,563	6.13%
Total Polled	21,682	42.85%	354,483	56.42%	5,962,031	63.60%
Registered Electors	50,598		628,317		9,374,164	

== Demographics ==
=== Ethnicity ===
The Yatinuwara Polling Division has a Sinhalese majority (89.9%). In comparison, the Kandy Electoral District has a Sinhalese majority (74.4%) and a significant Moor population (13.9%).

Ethnicity in Yatinuwara
1. Sinhalese (89.9%)
2. Moor (7.10%)
3. Sri Lankan Tamil (2.40%)
4. Other (0.60%)

=== Religion ===
The Yatinuwara Polling Division has a Buddhist majority (88.8%). In comparison, the Kandy Electoral District has a Buddhist majority (73.4%) and a significant Muslim population (14.3%).

Religion in Yatinuwara
1. Buddhist (88.8%)
2. Muslim (7.30%)
3. Hindu (2.20%)
4. Other (1.70%)
