= P. B. G. Kalugalla =

Sri Lankan politician

Hon. Dr P. B. G. Kalugalla

Member of Parliament for Kegalle District
- In office 1994–2000

Personal details
- Born: 19 March 1920
- Died: 20 November 2007 (aged 87) British Ceylon
- Party: Sri Lanka Freedom Party
- Other political affiliations: Democratic United National Front
- Spouse: Thilaka Natha Kalugalla
- Children: Champa; Jayanthi; Indira
- Education: Maris Stella College; Ananda College
- Occupation: Politician
- Profession: Lawyer

Punchi Banda Gunathilleke Kalugalla (19 March 1920 – 20 November 2007; commonly known as P. B. G. Kalugalla) was a Sri Lankan politician, Cabinet Minister and diplomat.

He contested the 1956 election as a Sri Lanka Freedom Party candidate for Kegalle electorate, won and was appointed a Parliamentary Secretary to the Minister of Health by S. W. R. D. Bandaranaike. In June 1959, he was appointed Minister of Cultural Affairs & Social Services, and held that portfolio under W. Dahanayake. Having held his seat in the 1960 parliamentary elections, he was appointed Minister of Transport & Works by Sirimavo Bandaranaike. In November 1962, he was appointed Minister of Finance, then Minister of Education & Cultural Affairs in Bandaranaike's May 1963 cabinet reshuffle. Kalugalla held his seat through elections in 1965 and 1970, being appointed Minister of Shipping & Tourism, with Aviation being added to his portfolio following the Lanka Sama Samaja Party's departure from the Cabinet in 1975. The 1977 elections saw him lose the Kegalle seat, but won it back in 1994 on the Democratic United National Front ticket, being appointed Deputy Minister of Justice & Cultural Affairs by Chandrika Kumaratunge.

== See also ==
- List of Sri Lankan non-career diplomats
