= Doluwa =

- Town
- Country: Sri Lanka
- Province: Central Province
- District: Kandy District
- Time zone: UTC+5:30 (Sri Lanka Standard Time)

Doluwa is a town in the Kandy District in the Central Province of Sri Lanka.

== See also ==
- List of towns in Central Province, Sri Lanka
