= St. Mary's College, Negombo =

1AB National School in Sri Lanka

St. Mary's College, Negombo සාන්ත මරියා විද්‍යාලය, මීගමුව
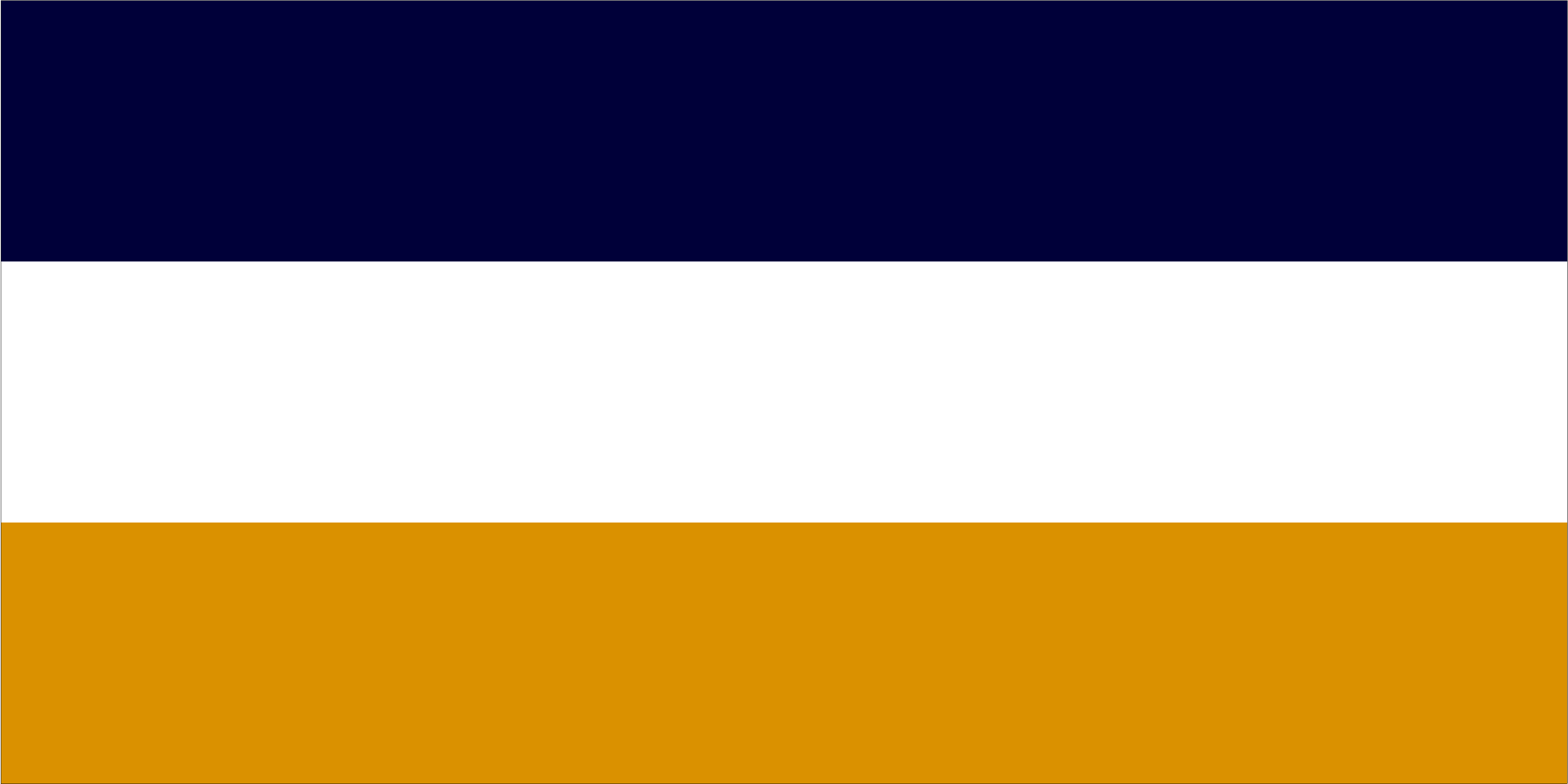

Location
- Negombo, 11500; Sri Lanka
- Coordinates: 7°12′37.5″N 79°50′11.8″E

Information
- Type: 1AB National School
- Motto: Latin: "Viam Sapientiae Monstrabo Tibi" (I will show you the path of wisdom)
- Religious affiliation: Catholicism
- Established: 6 October 1871; 154 years ago
- Founder: John Vistarini
- School code: SMCN
- Rector: Sudath Hemantha Fernando
- Grades: 1 - 13
- Gender: Boys
- Age range: 6 - 19
- Enrollment: 2,250
- Language: Sinhala and English
- Houses: Alles; Briton; Cazugal; Sebastian
- Colors: Midnight blue, white, goldenrod
- Song: St. Mary's boys let's play the game of life
- Team name: Maryites
- Alumni: SMCN OBA

St. Mary's College, Negombo is a provincial Catholic school in Negombo, Gampaha District, Sri Lanka. Located next to St. Mary's Cathedral of Grand Street.

== History ==
The school was founded in 1871 by Father Monsignor John Vistarini, priest of the Grand Street parish and a Catholic missionary in Sri Lanka, who dedicated the school to Mary, mother of Jesus. With the help of foreign missionaries who came to Sri Lanka, he gave English education to local children. Father F. L. Briton (1906–1914) was the first principal of the school.

In 1917, the Marist Brothers arrived in Sri Lanka and chose St. Mary's College as their first educational institution. In 1923, Mary Christine de Cruz and Rosa Isabella de Cruz donated a piece of land at Coppara Junction to St. Mary's College. The Marist Brothers started a school as a branch of St. Mary's College. In 1924, they asked the General Manager of Catholic Schools to change the name "St. Mary's College" to "Maris Stella College".

In 1960, the Sri Lankan government took over the schools, but the management had decided to make this college private and fee-free.

During 1973-1981, the land belonging to St. Mary's Convent was taken over by the school, and the school's head built two-floor, three-floor and four-floor buildings for science, commerce and arts subjects.

In 1984 St. Mary's College was named the centre of ten schools in West Negombo.

In 1995 the school was returned to the Marist Brothers.
