= Attanagalu Oya =

River in Sri Lanka

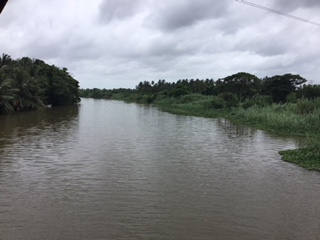
- Attanagalu Oya, near Dandugama

- Location within Sri Lanka
- Native name: අත්තනගලු ඔය (Sinhala)

Location
- Country: Sri Lanka

Physical characteristics
- Source: Kegalle District
  - location: Galapitamada
- 2nd source: Indurana Ela
  - location: Indurana
- Mouth: Negombo Lagoon
  - location: Dandugama
  - coordinates: 07°10′N 79°53′E
- Length: 76 km (47 mi)
- Basin size: 727 km^{2} (281 sq mi)
- Discharge
  - average: 40 m^{3}/s (1,400 cu ft/s)
  - minimum: 20 m^{3}/s (710 cu ft/s)
  - maximum: 100 m^{3}/s (3,500 cu ft/s)

The Attanagalu Oya (Sinhala: අත්තනගලු ඹය) is a river in Gampaha District, Sri Lanka.

The length of the river is approximately 76 km, with a drainage basin of 727 km^{2}. It originates in Galapitamada area in Kegalle district and drains into the Negombo Lagoon as the Dandugam Oya. The river often causes flooding in low-lying areas in the Gampaha district.

== Hydrology ==
The river originates from lower peneplains of Kegalle District in Galapitamada area. It is joined by the left tributaries Basnagoda Oya and Waharaka Oya in Karasnagala and later joined by Algama Oya further down stream close to Attanagalla town.

Uruwal Oya and Diyaeli Oya joins the Attanagalu Oya in Gampaha. The river then flows in a northerly direction and joined by Kimbulapitiya oya and Mapalan Oya in Madawala (near Katunayake) and forms Dandugam Oya, Attanagalu Oya-Dandugam Oya river system then finally discharges into Negombo Lagoon in Dandugama Area where Muthurajawela meets Negombo Lagoon. Close to its mouth it is also joined by Ja-Ela which is a diversion of the Uruwal Oya.

== Tributaries ==
- Left
  - Basnagoda Oya
  - Waharaka Oya
  - Uruwal Oya
  - Ja Ela
- Right
  - Algama Oya
  - Diyaeli Oya
  - Kimbulapitiya Oya/ Dunagaha Ela
  - Mapalan Oya
