= Dandugama =

Coordinates: 7°06′N 79°53′E

Dandugama (Sinhala: දඬුගම) is a village in Sri Lanka. It is own for Ja-Ela polling division at Gampaha District at Western Province, Sri Lanka.

== Location ==
In Colombo-Negombo road (A3) the 17 km post situated within the area of Dandugama village. It margined by Dandugam river or Aththanagalu oya in north, by Tudella in south, by Depa stream which is going parallel to Pothuwila, Pothuwila is a tank supplied water to paddy field called Muthrajawela in previous times in east. In west Dandugama margined by Kapapu stream, which used for transport in Dutch period in Ceylon.

== Story behind the name ==
Through the margin of Dandugama the river called Aththanagalu oya is running to the Negombo lagoon. In the ancient times the people who select this land for living was try to build a bridge across the river. For build that bridge they carried the tree trunks, in sinhala dandu (දඬු) via the river and collected, in Sinhala baa (බෑ) them in some place, in Sinhala gama (ගම). Latterly the name becomes Dandugama.

දඬු + බෑ + ගම = දඬුගම

== History ==
In the Kotte era, Sri Lanka invaded by a powerful Tamil king called Aryacakravarti who governed the kingdom of Jaffna. He widened his kingdom through the west coast from Jaffna to south and he established some forts at cities like Chilaw, Negombo, Wattala etc. and assigned some ruler to each area.

According to the legends Dandugama and the surrounding villages governed by the ruler called Seraman under the king Aryacakravarti. Some ruins (ex:- Kadipokuna) remain in the village make evidence to say the legends are true. Even in today's have some traditional festivals like Nanamura festival in Gammadupitiya Dewala at Dandugama, since the era of king Seraman.

In the Kokila Sandesha, poem written in Kotte era, has some information in dandugama. In that Dandugam oya mentioned as Kindigoda oya. This is 174th poem included in Kokila Sandesha.

රැඳේ ඉවුරස පුල් නාමල් වෙල පතුර
බැඳේ නිල් වරල ගෙන හැරනරකඳ පතුර
ඇදේ සිප් සමග ලිය පැහැතල පතුර
කිඳිගොඩ ඔය කෙලි දැක සතොසල පතුර

කොවුල් හස්ත 174

In the times Europeans govern Sri Lanka, by Portuguese, Dutch and British sequentially, Dandugama under the control of those people. So even after that periods remains some aspects of those like St. Mark's Church, Dandugama, Reformed church build by Dutches, and Holy Rosary Church, Dehiyagatha, Roman Catholic church,.

Since ancient times to the near history the main way of bread winning is cultivation of rice.

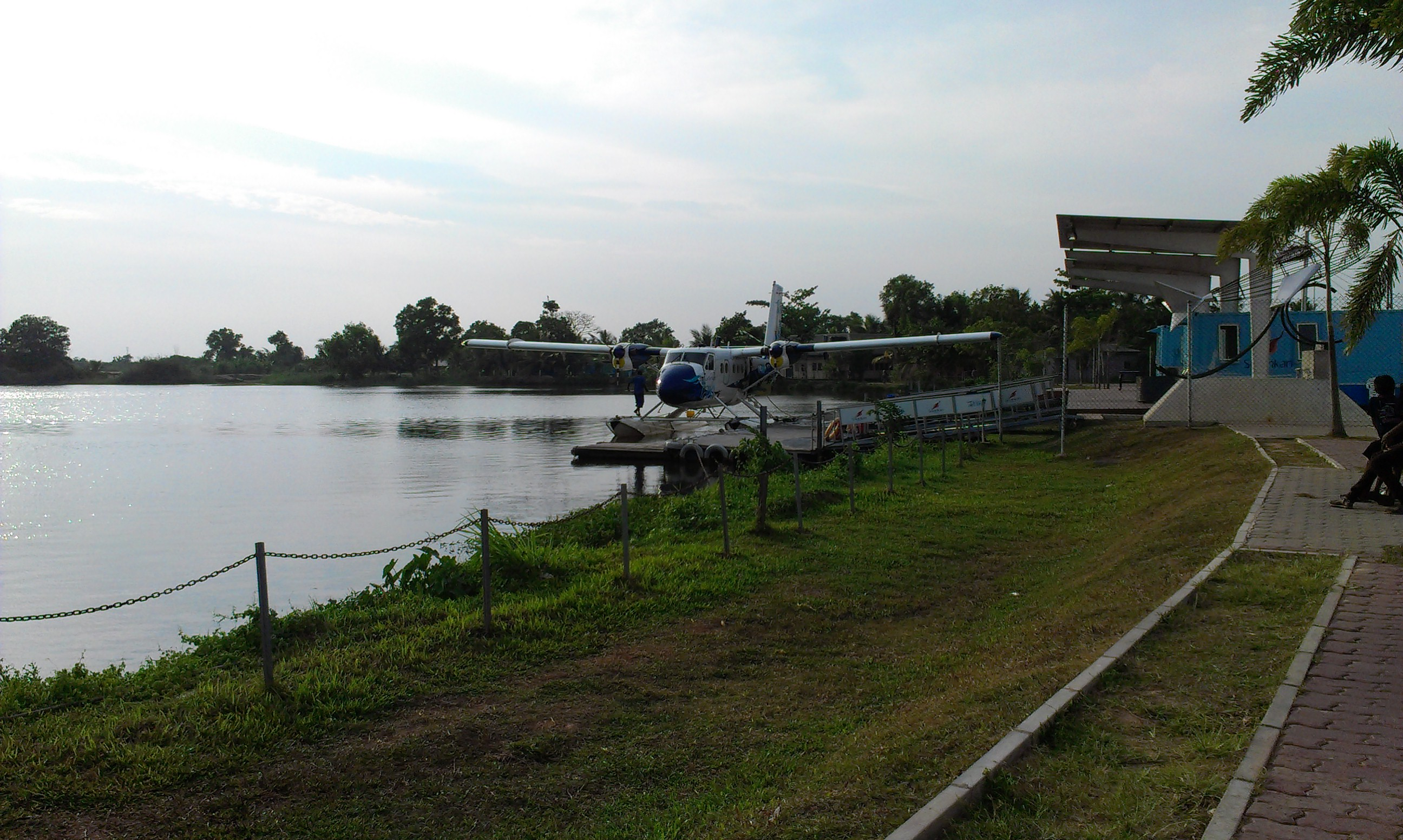
Sea Plane Airfort Dandugama

== Present ==
Today's there are no farmers and paddy fields or tanks in the village. Farmers leave from cultivation and then the paddy fields and tanks were filled with soil for build new houses and apartments. There are no fishermens anymore but have some people who supply fish to the city of Colombo even today's as favorite business of most people in the village. And now there are lot of educated and talented people work in government and private sector.

The most villagers are Roman Catholics and others are Christians and few number of Buddhists. Most of the villagers are predominantly Sinhalese along with a few |Tamils respectively.
