= Kandawala, Negombo =

Kandawala කඳවල கந்தவல
- Suburb
- Location in Sri Lanka
- Coordinates: 7°14′14″N 79°52′51″E
- Country: Sri Lanka
- Province: Western Province
- District: Gampaha
- Division: Katana
- Elevation: 2 m (6.6 ft)
- Time zone: UTC+5:30 (Sri Lanka Standard Time Zone)
- Postal code: 11532 (Thimbirigaskatuwa); 11534 (Kandawala)
- Area code: 031

Kandawala (Sinhala: කඳවල, romanized: Kan̆davala, Tamil: கந்தவல, romanized: Kantavala) (also known as Kandawala - Negombo and Kandawala - Katana) is a suburb of the city of Negombo, Sri Lanka.

== Administration ==
Kandawala consists of three Grama Niladhari divisions: Ihala Kandawala, Pahala Kandawala and K. C. De Silva Pura, while the Kandawala Electoral Ward (subdivided into consisting Ilhala Kandawala and Pahala Kandawala) comes under the purview of the Katana Pradesiya Sabha.

Poththode, Anandapura and Batapaththala are other areas that lie within Kandawala.

In the Local Government Elections held in 2018, United National Party candidate Lasantha Deepal was elected to the Kandawala Ward, defeating Sri Lanka Podujana Peramuna candidate Daisy Hapuarachchi.

== Historical tower ==
Kandawala was home to a tower built in 1796 by the colonial Dutch for communication and surveillance, with a height of 150 feet (46 m). The tower was later used by the Department of Survey; it collapsed on 27 November 2015, with the remains visible today.

== Demographics ==
=== Roman Catholicism ===
Kandawala Parish is one of the largest parishes in the Roman Catholic Archdiocese of Colombo, and is home to the Our Lady of Sorrows Church, Demanhandiya church and Batapaththala church. A monastery of the Dominican Order and a community of Sisters of the Holy Family also exist in the area. Kandawala has a history of hosting Passion Plays, Yagaya being the best known.

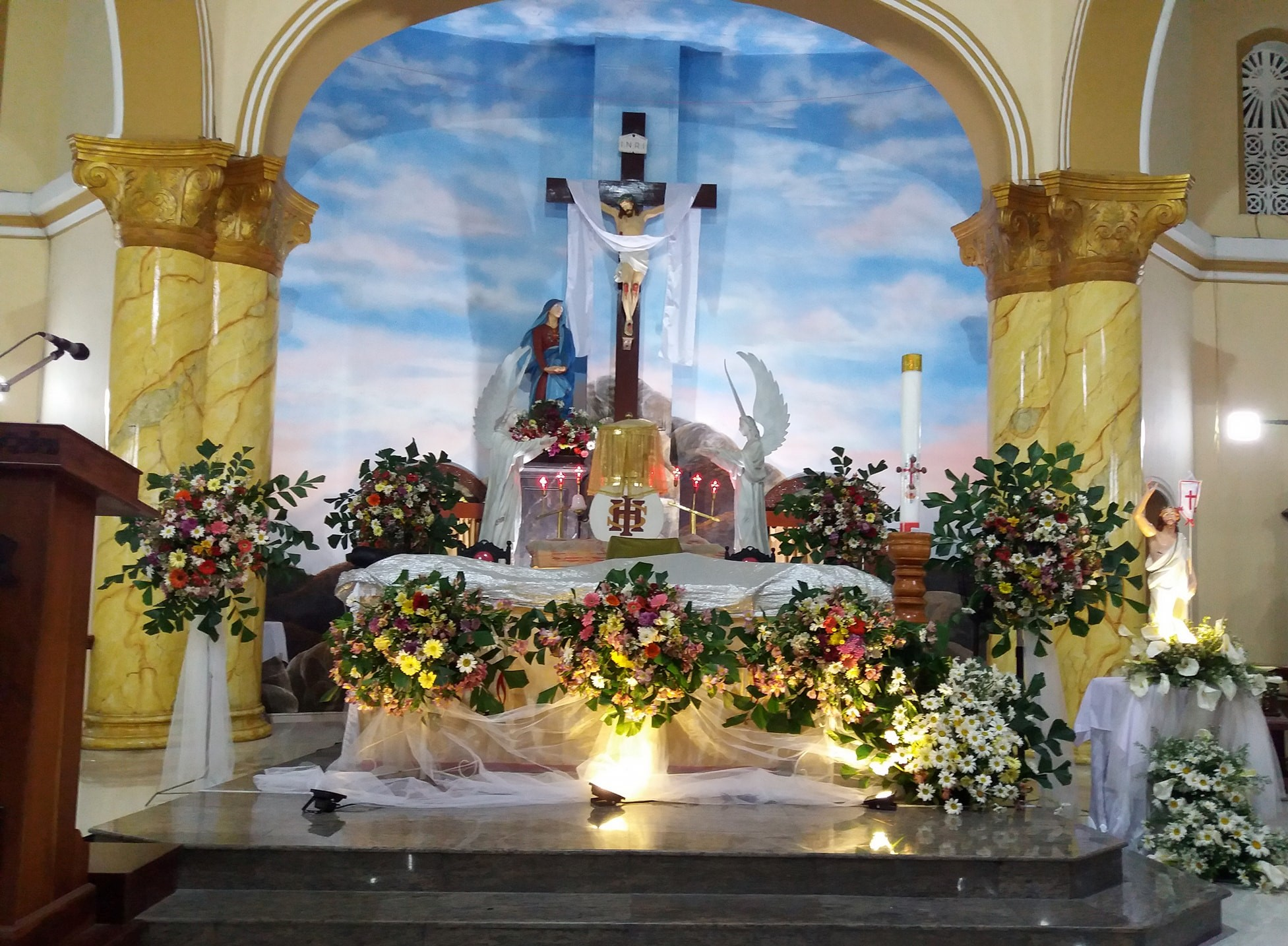
Kandawala Church

=== Buddhism ===
Poththode Ananda Wivekashrama and Pahala Kandawala Sri Sambudaramaya temples are Buddhist religious places in the area.

== Education ==
St. Joseph’s Junior School, Kandawala provides education for students from grades 1 to 11.

== Transportation ==
Kandawala is Located on the Negombo - Katana 251 bus route. Private buses are frequent, and several SLTB services are also available. A bus travelling from Nikaveratiya to Colombo via Pannala, Katana, Kandawala and Negombo also exists.

== Notable people ==
- Sunil Costa (Director, Script Writer, Actor)
