= Negombo Fort =

Fort in Negombo, Sri Lanka

- Part of Gampaha District
- Negombo, Sri Lanka
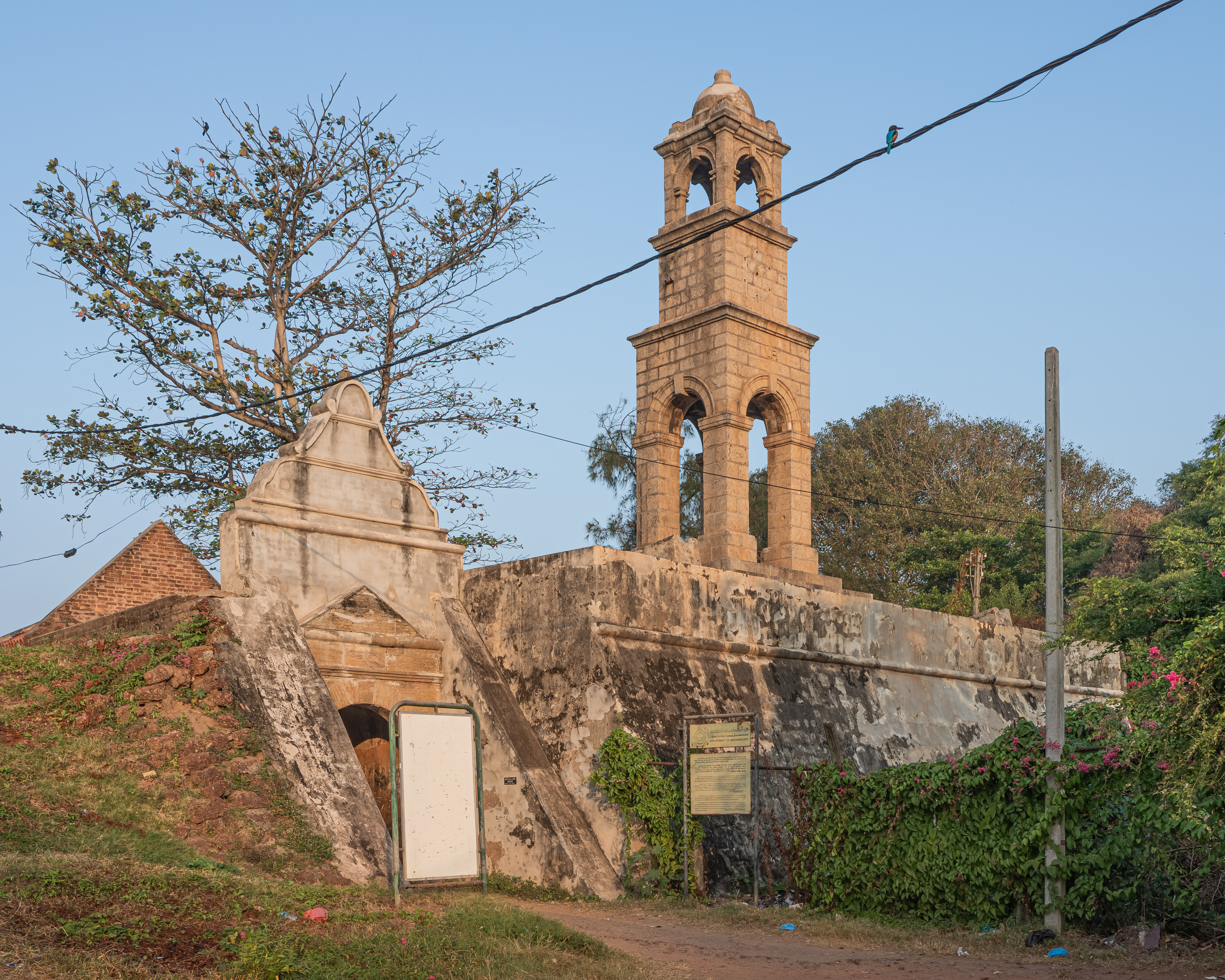

Site information
- Type: Defence fort
- Controlled by: Government of Sri Lanka
- Open to the public: No
- Condition: Good

Location
- Sri Lanka
- Location within Sri Lanka
- Coordinates: 7°12′30″N 79°49′50″E

Site history
- Built: 1672
- Built by: Portuguese
- Materials: limestone and coral

Negombo Fort (Sinhala: මීගමුව බලකොටුව, romanized: Migamuwa Balakotuwa; Tamil: நீர்கொழும்புக் கோட்டை, romanized: Nīrkoḻumpuk Kōṭṭai) was a small but important fort in Negombo, approx. 30 km (19 mi) north of Colombo, that was built by the Portuguese to defend Colombo.

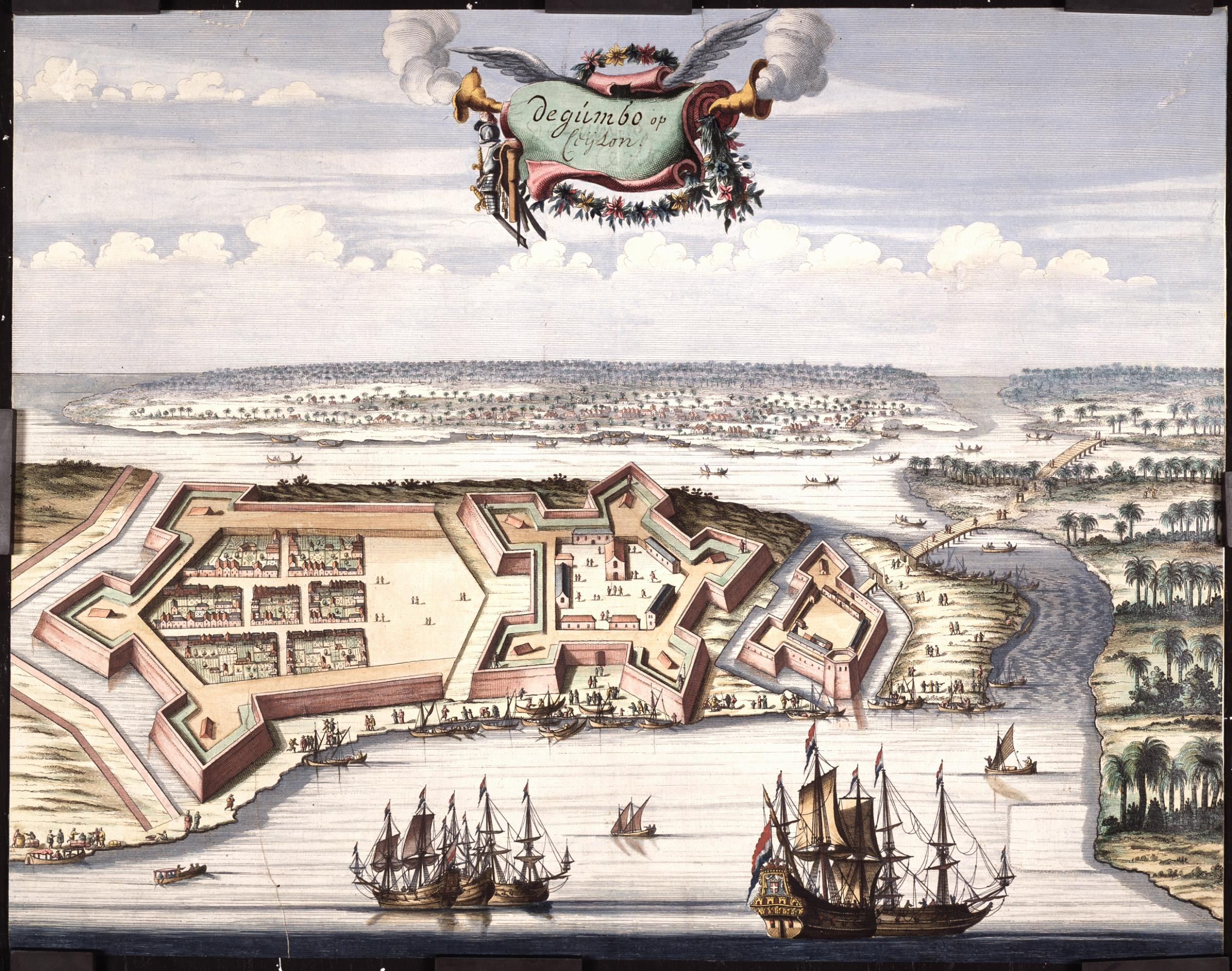
1665 Map of Negombo fort

In its time the fort at Negombo was probably the next in strategic importance after Colombo, Jaffna and Galle. The original Portuguese fort was a weak structure, which, according to the account of João Ribeyro;

"Negombo was only a square enclosed by walls, with two redoubts and five guns. A Captain and a few men, with a Chaplain were stationed there"

It was captured by Dutch forces commanded by Philip Lucasz, in February 1640. The Portuguese made several attempts to retake it before they were successful in December 1643. They then strengthened the fortifications and managed to defend the fort until it was recaptured by the Dutch under the command of François Caron, in January 1644.

The original bastions were destroyed by the Dutch cannons during the siege of the fort. The Dutch subsequently rebuilt it in 1672 however not on the usual square pattern, but on a pentagonal one, though it had only four bulwarks, the fifth was never constructed (possibly due to the cost). The fort was located on a narrow strip of land between a lagoon and an inlet of the sea. It was surrounded by a dry moat, and the gate was accessed via a drawbridge.

In February 1796 it was occupied by the British without opposition. In the late 1800s the British authorities decided to demolish the fort and build a prison in its place, constructed from the stones of the fort. Today all that remains is a section of the eastern rampart with mounds at its northern and Southern ends, where the previous bastions existed, and a recessed arched gateway. Above the gateway is a slab of granite, with the date 1678 inscribed, surmounted by a high decorative gable. The site is still used as a prison by the Department of Prisons.

== See also ==
- Forts of Sri Lanka
- Nelson, W. A.; de Silva, Rajpal Kumar (2004). The Dutch Forts of Sri Lanka - The Military Monuments of Ceylon. Sri Lanka Netherlands Association.
- Lewcock, Ronald; Sansoni, Barbara; Senanayake, Laki (1998). The Architecture of an Island - The Living Heritage of Sri Lanka. Barefoot (Pvt) Ltd. ISBN 9789559466000.
