= Hamilton Canal =

Canal in Sri Lanka

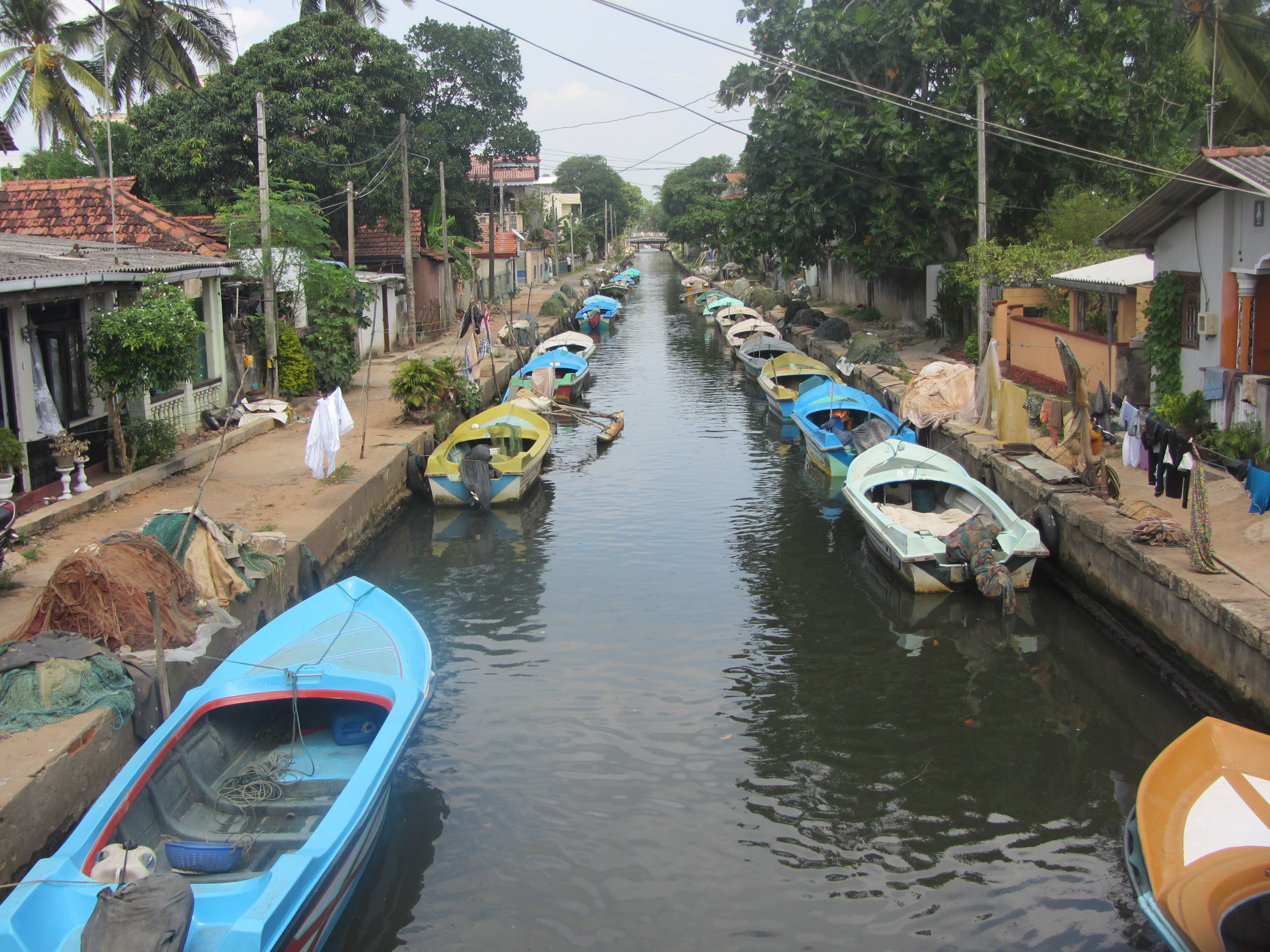
- Interactive map of Hamilton Canal

Specifications
- Length: 14.5 km (9.0 miles)
- Status: Open

History
- Modern name: Negombo Dutch Canal
- Principal engineer: George Atkinson
- Construction began: 1802
- Date completed: 1804

Geography
- Start point: Puttalam (originally Puttalam Lagoon near the Karamba Road)
- End point: Colombo (originally Kelani River at Kelaniya)

The Hamilton Canal (Sinhala: හැමිල්ටන් ඇල Hæmiltan Æla), also commonly known as the Dutch Canal, is a 14.5 km (9.0 mi) canal in Sri Lanka, connecting Puttalam to Colombo via Negombo. The canal was constructed by the British in 1802 and completed in 1804. It was designed to drain salt water out of the Muthurajawela wetlands. The canal was named after Gavin Hamilton, the Government Agent of Revenue and Commerce.

== History ==
=== Early history ===
The first mention of the canals along the western seaboard of Sri Lanka was in the 8th century, when the Persian geographer, Abu Zayd al-Balkhi reported a voyage lasting weeks along the 'Gobbs of Serendib', the Arabian term for the linked lagoons along the coast.

Six centuries later the King of Kotte, Veera Parakramabahu VIII (1477–1496), had a network of canals constructed connecting outlying villages with Colombo and Negombo Lagoon so that produce such as areca nuts, cloves, cardamom, pepper and cinnamon, could be more easily transported to the kingdom’s main seaport at Negombo.

=== Middle history ===
In 1613 a Portuguese missionary, Father Manoel Barradas, describes how "Near Columbo the Fathers embarked on a canal by which they entered into the River Calane [Kelani Ganga], and going down the river they proceeded into another canal as narrow as shady, so that the oars, although they were very short, could scarcely fulfil their office". "By this they went as far as Negumbo, which is six Chingala leagues." In the 17th century the Portuguese constructed a canal from Hendala to Pamunugama.

The Dutch established the centre of their colony at Colombo. They then attempted to grow paddy rice in the surrounding marshes in Muthurajawela, but found that—as the previous Sinhalese kings had before them—the coastal tides inundated the fields with sea water. Between 1658 and 1795, the Dutch undertook the construction of a series of structures, dams and canals using and enhancing the original system of waterways in an attempt to drain the salt water from the rice fields and to transport cinnamon in barges through to the seaport at Negombo. This system, known as the 'Dutch Canal', formed a "continuous line of waterways between ports and the remote sections of territory under the Dutch". The Dutch canal, at its maximum, extended 172 km (107 mi) in length.

=== Later history ===
In 1796 the British took control of the island and in 1802 a new Colombo-Negombo canal was built, conceived by George Atkinson, the Colonial Surveyor General and supported by Gavin Hamilton (1494–1803), the Government Agent of Revenue and Commerce. The Hamilton Canal, as it became known, ran parallel to and west of the old Dutch Canal, closer to the sea, from the mouth of the Kelani Ganga at Hekitta to the southern edge of the Negombo Lagoon at Pamunugama, a distance of 14.5 km (9.0 mi). Hamilton had accompanied Frederick North (first British Governor of Ceylon 1798–1805) to Ceylon in 1798, where he became the private secretary to Hugh Cleghorn, Colonial Secretary of Ceylon. He subsequently became the private secretary to Governor North. In April 1799 Hamilton was appointed Acting Civil Paymaster and in 1802 the Deputy Paymaster General. He succeeded Joseph Greenhill as Agent of Revenue and Commerce for the District of Colombo. Hamilton died in February 1803 prior to the completion of the canal in 1804. After his death he was found to have embezzled £19,675.

The canal was designed to connect the original Dutch canal by a series of parallel waterways in order to drain the already damaged Muthurajawela but created the opposite effect, as the coastal tides brought increasing salinity not only from Negombo Lagoon but also the Kelani Ganga.

Following the construction of the railway line between Puttalam and Colombo in 1926, the water route was abandoned.

=== 21st century restoration ===
In 2012 the Sri Lanka Land Reclamation and Development Corporation commenced work rehabilitating and restoring the canal. The first stage was a 9 kilometres (5.6 mi) stretch between Maha Oya and Negombo. The second phase of the works between the Kelani Ganga and Negombo commenced on 20 February 2013. The first 2.5 kilometres (1.6 mi) section, between the Hekiththa junction and Pinwatta was completed on 2 August 2013 at a cost of Rs. 400 million with financial assistance from the Japanese Bank for International Cooperation.
