= Saint Stephen's Church, Negombo =

Anglican church in Negombo, Sri Lanka

Coordinates: 7.255°N 79.832°E

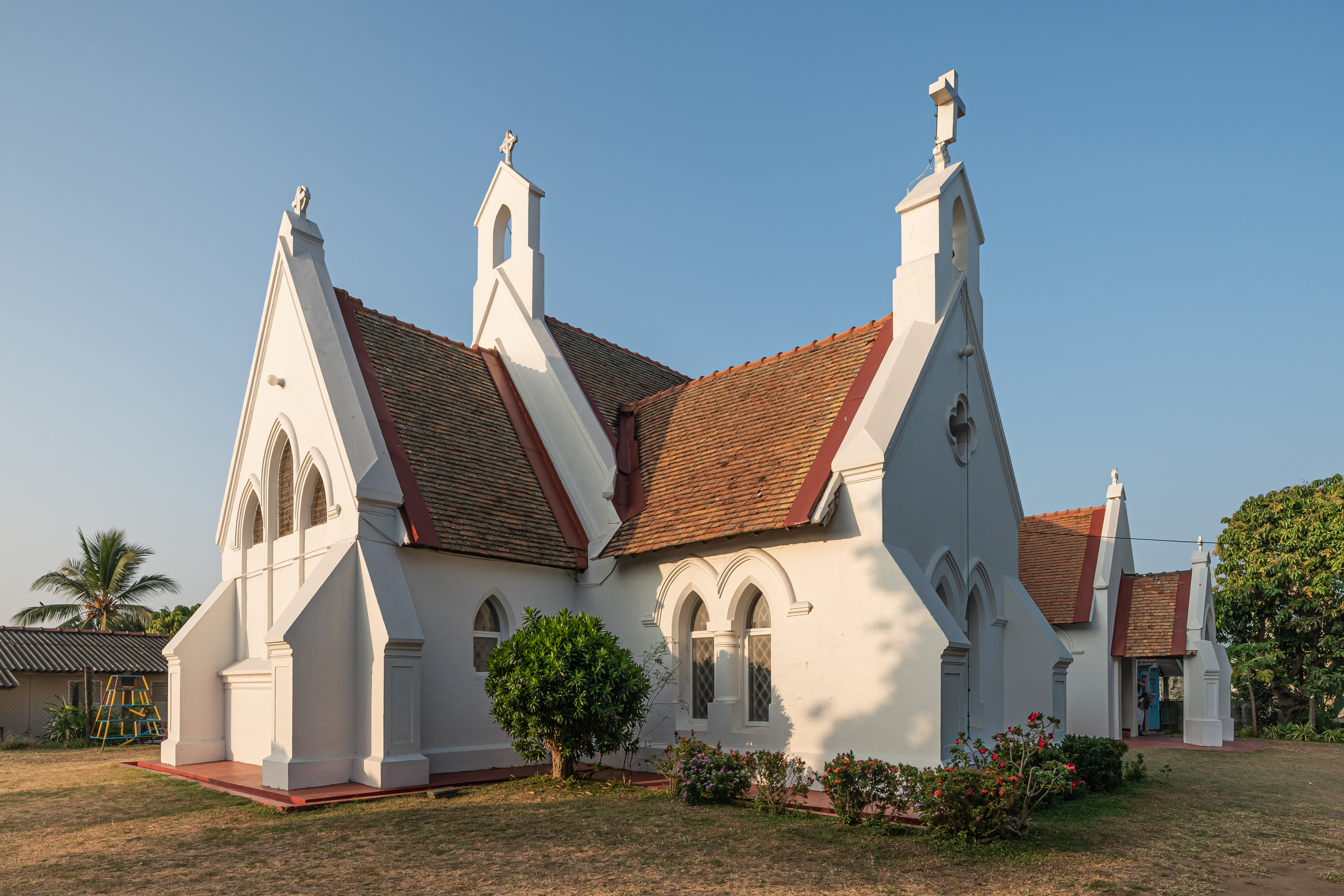
- Saint Stephen's Church, Negombo

Religion
- Affiliation: Anglican
- Year consecrated: 31 July 1880
- Status: Active

Location
- Location: Negombo, Sri Lanka
- Interactive map of Saint Stephen's Church, Negombo

Architecture
- Type: Church
- Style: Gothic architecture
- Completed: 1877

Website
- St. Stephen's Church, Negombo

Saint Stephen's Church, Negombo, is an Anglican church in Negombo, Sri Lanka. It was consecrated on 31 July 1880 in the presence of dedicated devotees which included several Wesleyans. Service was also conducted in the Sinhalese language on the occasion when a Sinhalese woman was also baptised, under the sponsorship of two English women.

== Location ==
The church is situated in Negombo, Sri Lanka. It is in Negombo division, the second largest city in order in the Colombo Metropolitan Regional Structural plan of the Urban Development Authority (UDA). It is 6 kilometres (3.7 mi) from the Katunayake Airport and connected by the Colombo – Chilaw – Puttlam road.

== History ==
In the 18th century most of the settlements in Ceylon (now Sri Lanka) became a British territory annexed from the Dutch. But it was only in 1815, following the collapse of the Kandyan Kingdom, that the entire island came under British suzerainty. The Anglican Diocese of Colombo came into existence in 1845 and James Chapman was the first Anglican Bishop of Colombo. The Anglican community wanted to establish a church in Negombo in the nineteenth century and action was initiated by choosing a suitable site for the purpose in 1876. The area in which the site was chosen had previously been known as "The Dutch Fort". The Bishop of Colombo, Reverend Reginald Stephen Copleston, provided a Crown grant under order dated 23 September 1876 to build the church. The trustees of the church from Negombo were Henry Bell, Charles Karlenberg and Harry Maule F. Finch. The site measured two roods and 17 perches (One rood is equal to 1,012 square metres (10,890 ft^{2}) and 40 perches are equal to a rood). The church was constructed by the end of 1877, although church services were held before its formal consecration. The formal consecration ceremony was held on 31 July 1879.

== Feature ==
The church is built in the Gothic revival architectural style. A stone cross of small size is fixed on each the ridge-tiles at the top. The interior space in the church measures 19.74 by 7.32 metres (64.75 ft × 24 ft) including the passage. It has many windows which provide very good lighting in the interior space of the church. The north transept has a vestry and a belfry was added at a later date.

== Sources ==
- "PART I : SECTION (I) — GENERAL Government Notifications" (PDF). The Gazette of the Democratic Socialist Republic of Sri Lanka. 1, 739. 30 December 2011. Archived from the original (PDF) on 4 April 2017.
