= Our Lady of Sorrows Church, Kandawala =

Roman Catholic church in Kandawala, Negombo, Sri Lanka

Our Lady of Sorrow's Church, Kandawala
- ශුද්ධවු වික්‍ෂෝප දේවමාතා දෙව්මැදුර, කඳවල
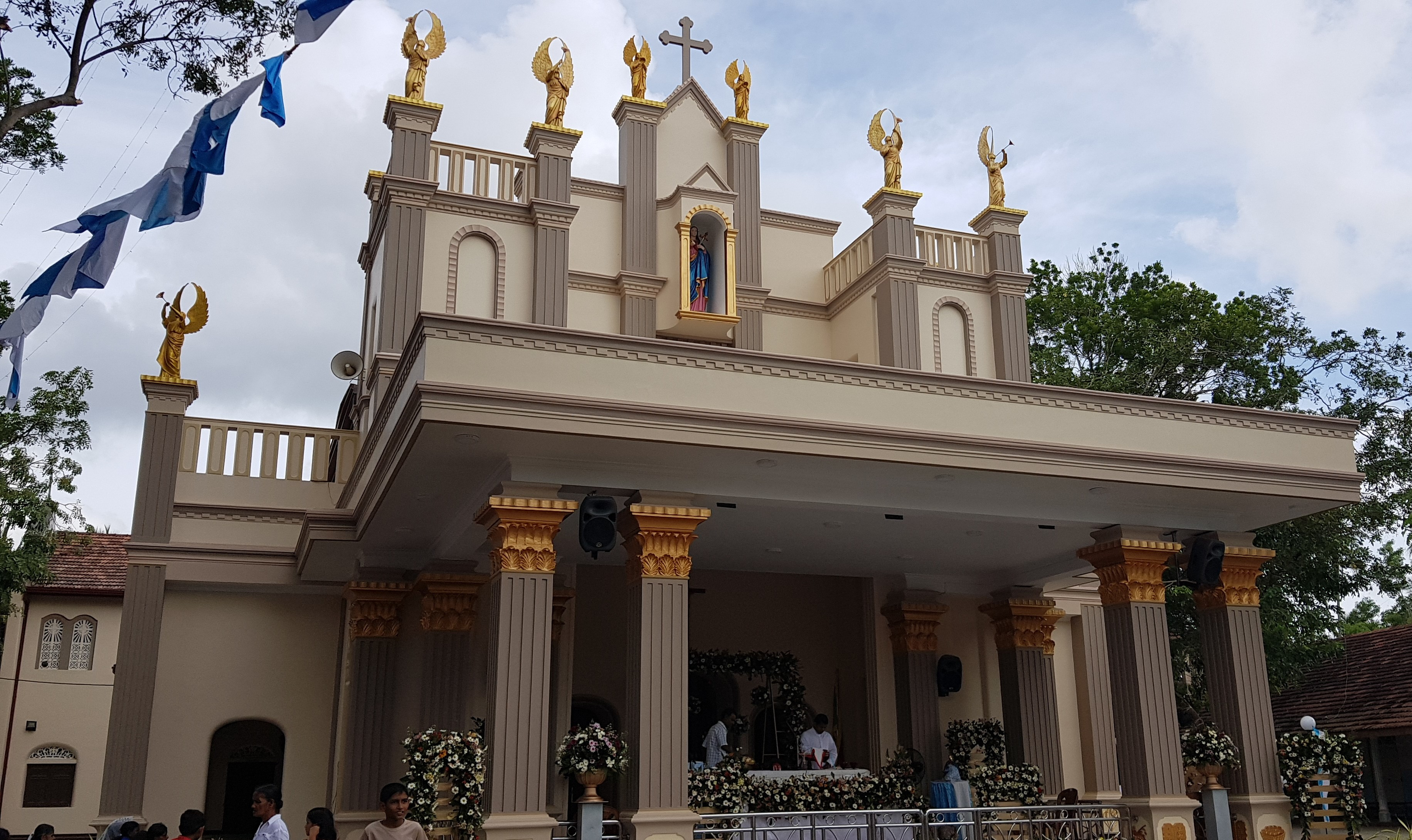
- Front view

- Our Lady of Sorrows Church
- 7°14′14″N 79°52′21″E
- Location: Kandawala, Negombo
- Country: Sri Lanka
- Denomination: Roman Catholic
- Tradition: Roman Rite

History
- Status: Roman Catholic Church
- Dedication: Our Lady of Sorrow

Architecture
- Completed: 1957

Administration
- Archdiocese: Colombo
- Deanery: Katana
- Parish: Kandawala

Clergy
- Archbishop: Malcolm Ranjith

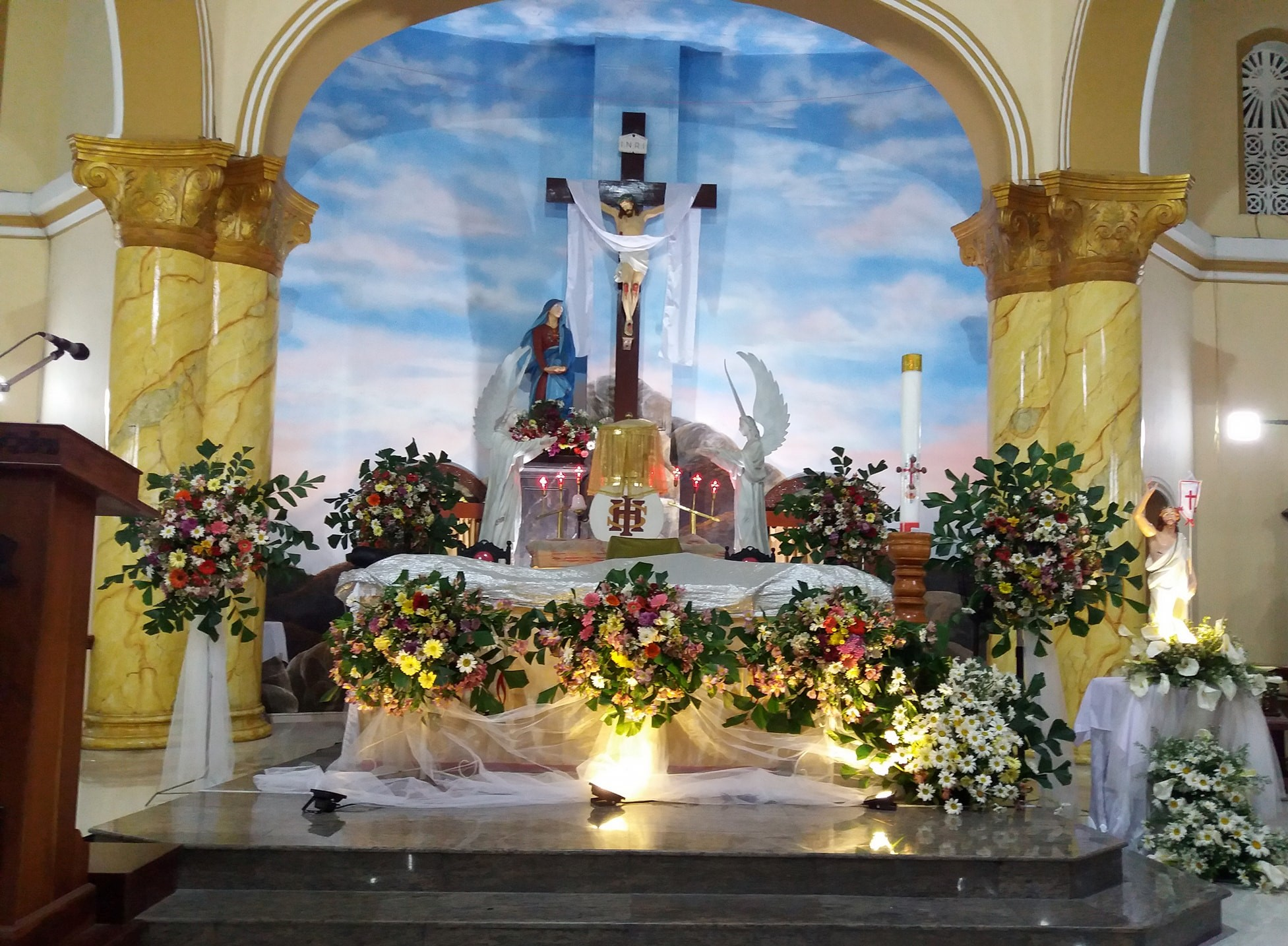
Altar of the Church

The Church of Our Lady of Sorrows (Sinhala: ශුද්ධවු වික්‍ෂෝප දේවමාතා දෙව්මැදුර Shudhdhawu Wikshopa Devamatha Dewmædura) (also known as Kandawala Church and Kandawala Palliya (Sinhala: කඳවල පල්ලිය)) is a Roman Catholic church located in Kandawala in the Archdiocese of Colombo, Sri Lanka.

Kandawala parish was home to the Church of Our Lady of Sorrows at Kandawala, St. Theresa's Church at Batapattala and Church of Infant Jesus at Demanhandiya. The Mission House of Kandawala Parish is also located at the church Our Lady of Sorrows Premises.

Kandawala Parish has a long history of hosting Passion Plays, with Yagaya being the best known.

== Feast ==
The annual Feast of our Lady of Sorrows Church is usually held in the 3rd Sunday of September or it will be held in the Sunday on or after September 15.

== Past Parish Priests ==
- Rev. Fr. Francis Fernando
- Rev. Fr. Merril Wijesinghe
- Rev. Fr. Reginald Saparamadu
- Rev. Fr. H. D. Anthony
- Rev. Fr. Sarath Thirimanne
- Rev. Fr. Canicius Neris
- Rev. Fr. Srikantha Fernando (Incumbent)

== Holy Family Convent ==
The Holy Family Convent is situated next to the church of Our Lady of Sorrows, established on 20 September 1902.
