= Negombo =

Fifth largest city in Sri Lanka

Negombo මීගමුව நீர்கொழும்பு
- City
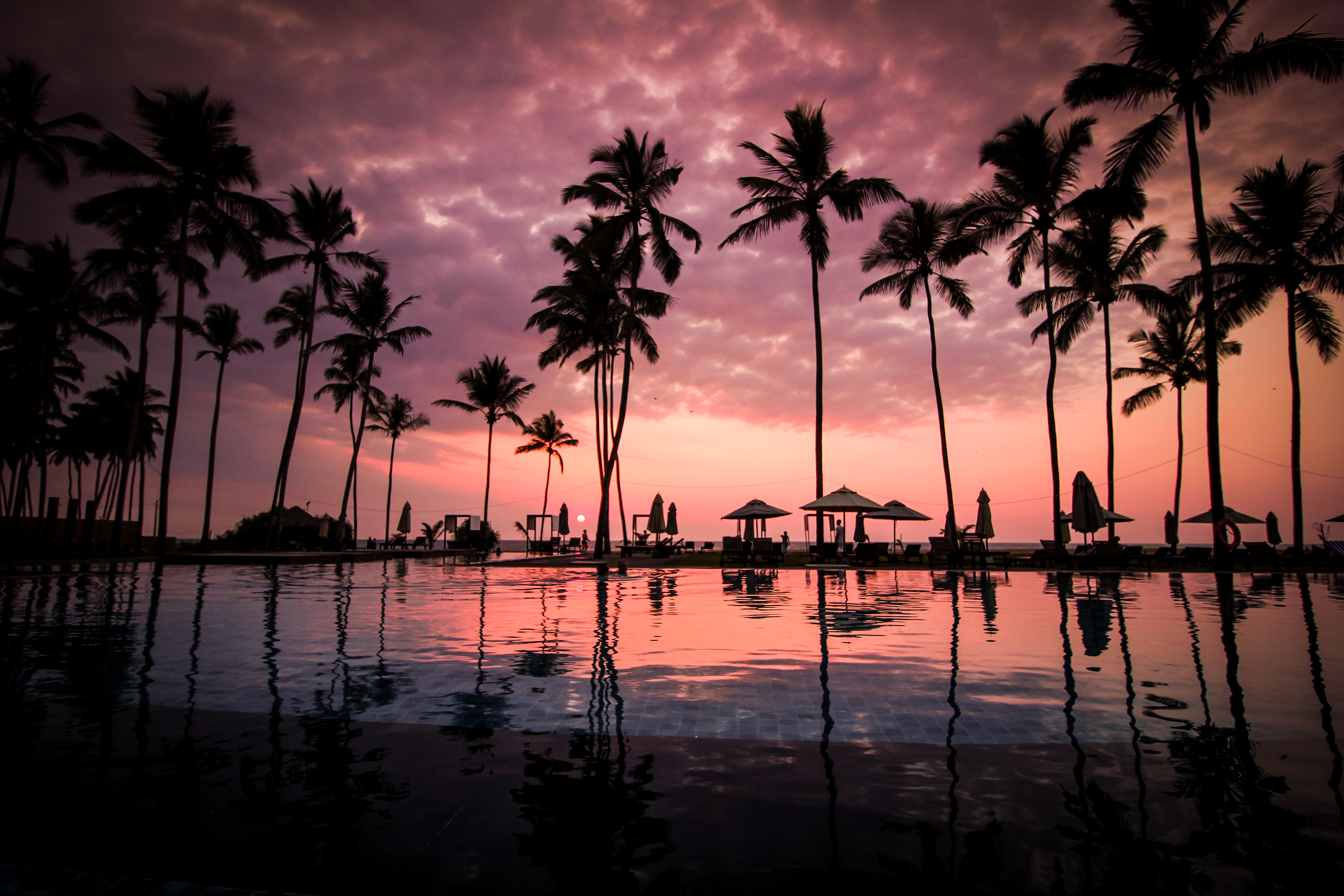
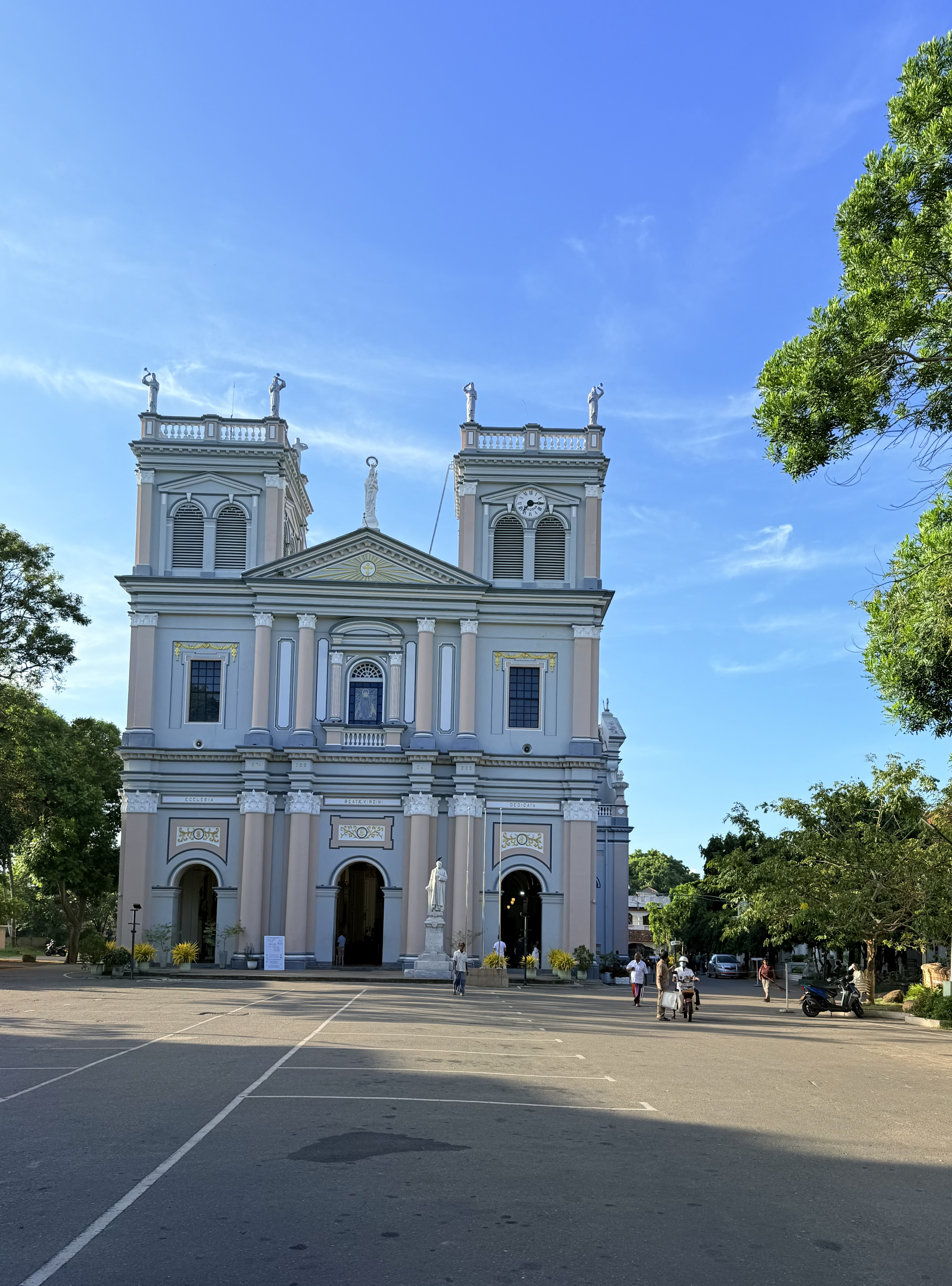
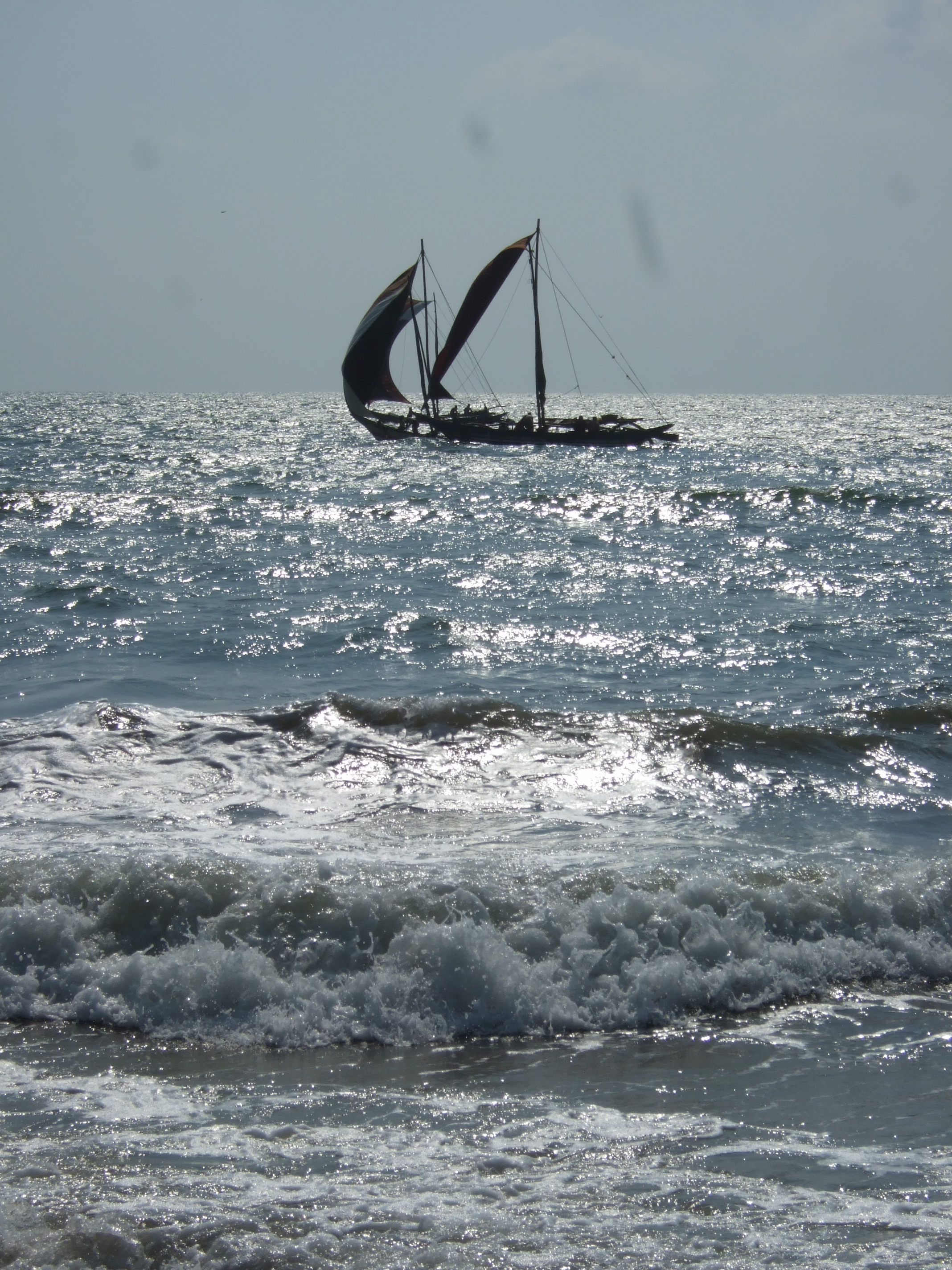
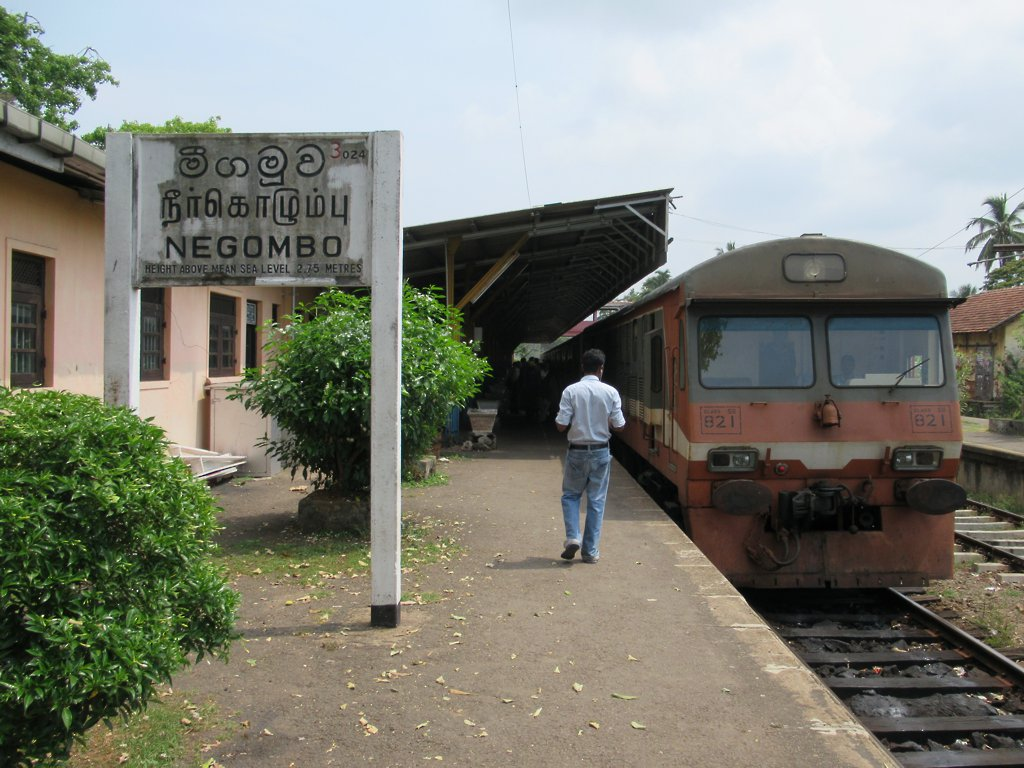
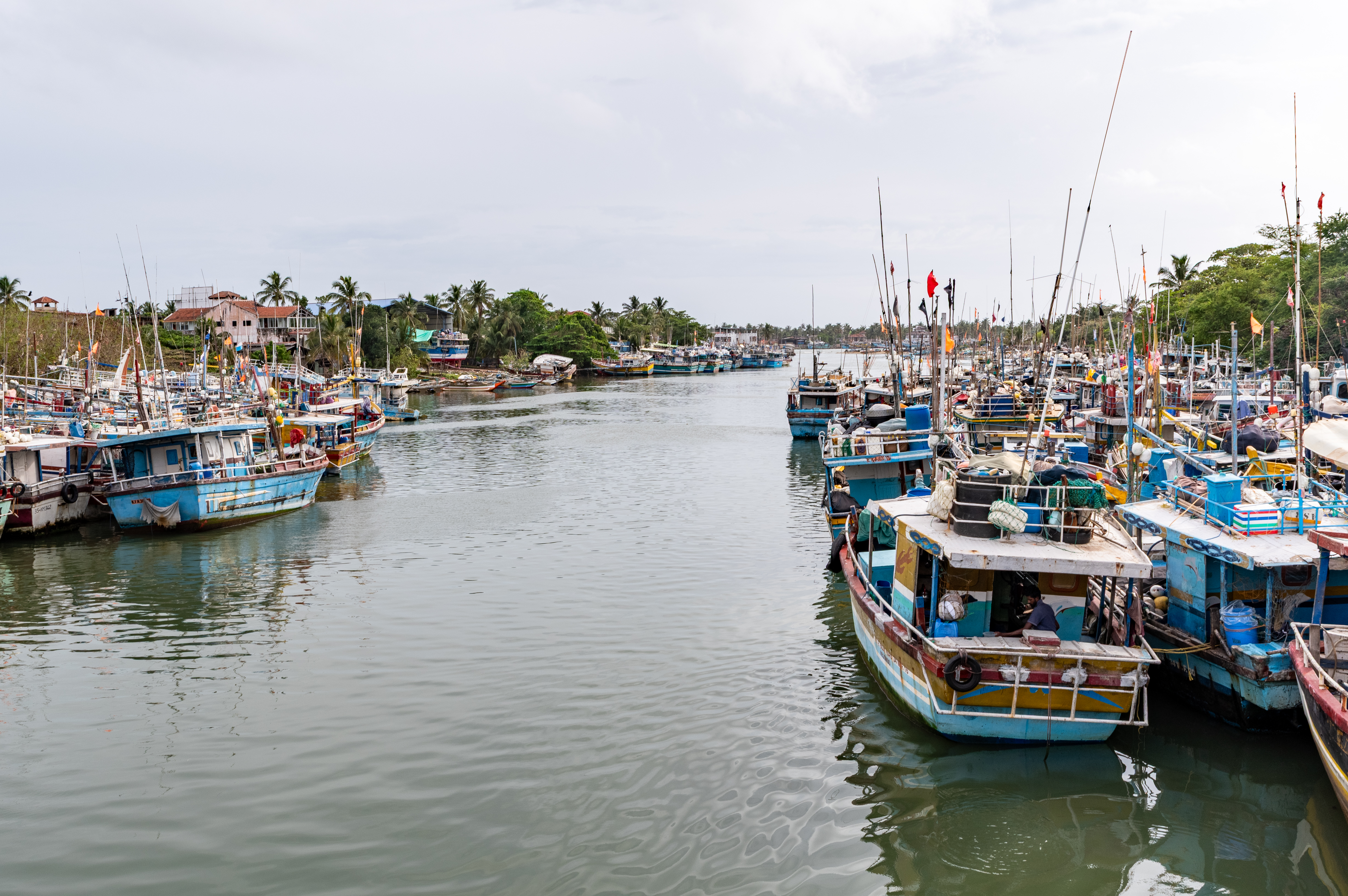
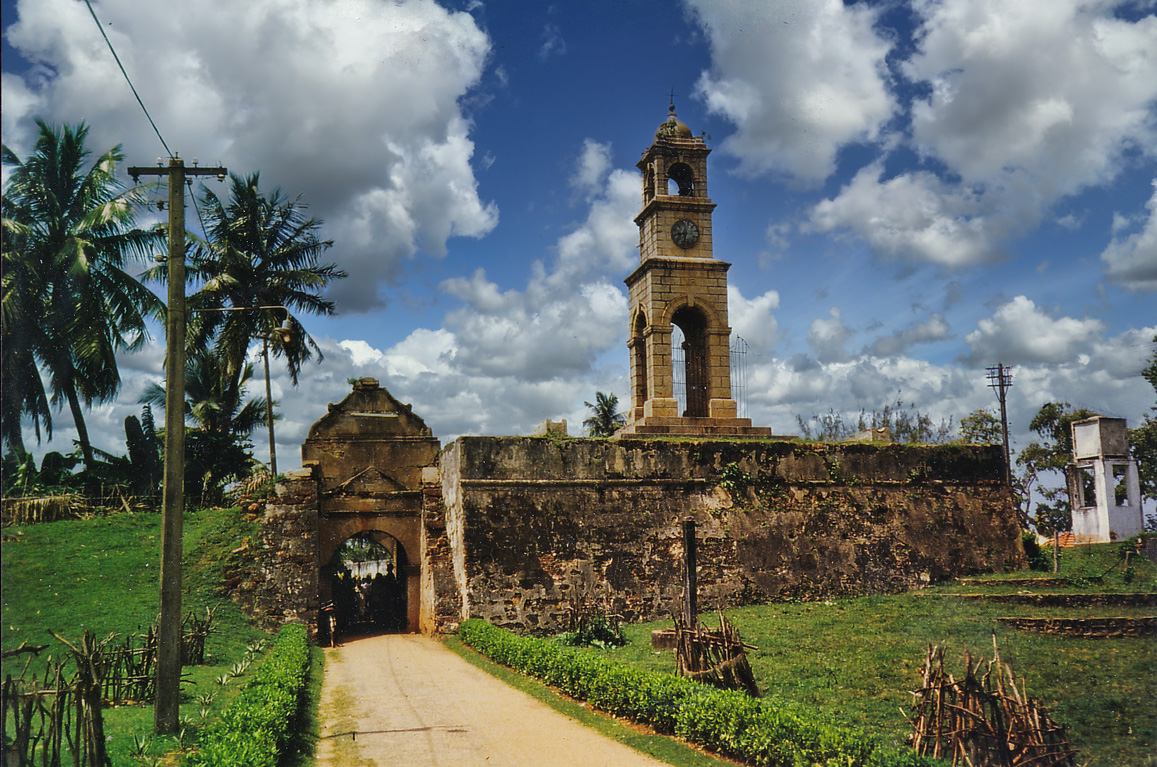
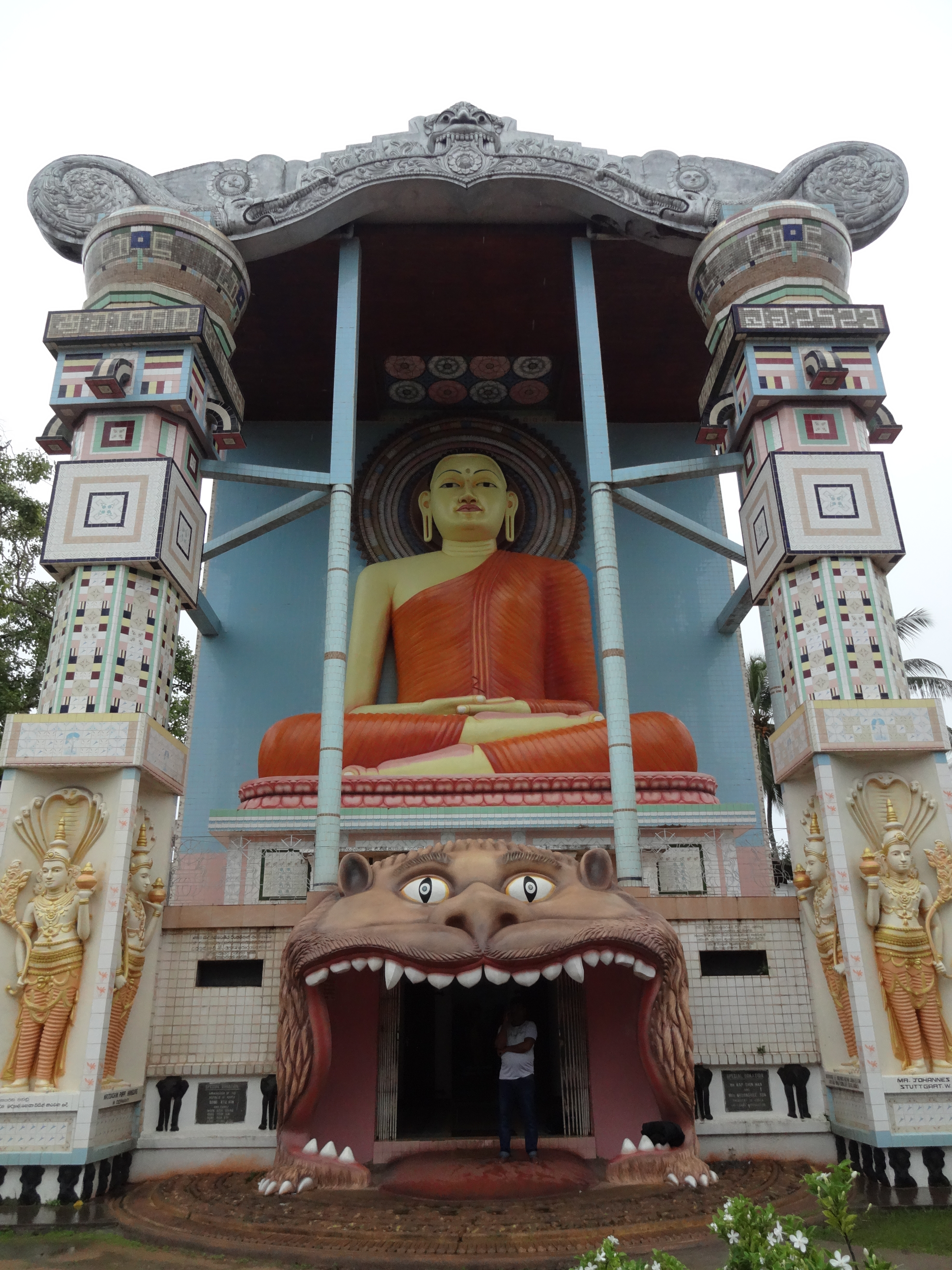
- Evening in Negombo St. Mary's Church Browns Beach Negombo Railway Station Negombo Lagoon Negombo Fort Angurukaramulla Temple
- Nicknames: Punchi Romaya (Sinhala: පුංචි රෝමය, romanized: Pungchi Rômaya, Meaning: Little Rome); Mipura (Sinhala: මීපුර, romanized: Mīpura, Meaning: City of Bees)
- Motto: "Unity, Peace, and Concord" (සමගිය, සාමය, සහ එකඟතාවය)
- Location in Sri Lanka
- Coordinates: 7°12′40″N 79°50′19″E
- Country: Sri Lanka
- Province: Western Province
- District: Gampaha
- Division: Negombo

Government
  - Type: Municipal Council
  - Body: Negombo Municipal Council
  - Mayor: Don Robert Hinkenda, (NPP)
  - Deputy Mayor: Edward Dulip Chamara Fernando, (NPP)

Area
  - Urban: 30 km^{2} (12 sq mi)
  - Metro: 34 km^{2} (13 sq mi)
- Elevation: 2 m (6.6 ft)

Population (Census 2024)
  - City: 137,952
  - Ethnic groups: Sinhalese; Sri Lankan Tamils; Sri Lankan Moors; Sri Lankan Malays; Burghers; Sri Lankan Chinese
- Demonym: Negombians
- Time zone: UTC+5:30 (Sri Lanka Standard Time Zone)
- Postal code: 11500
- Area code: 031

Negombo (Sinhala: මීගමුව, romanized: Mîgamuwa, IPA: [miːɡəmuʋə], Tamil: நீர்கொழும்பு, romanized: Nīrkoḻumpu, IPA: [n̪iːɾxoɻumbɯ]), also known as Punchi Romaya (Little Rome) and Mîpura (city of bees), is a major city in Sri Lanka, situated on the west coast and at the mouth of the Negombo Lagoon, in the Western Province, 38 km (24 mi) from Colombo via the Colombo–Katunayake Expressway and the nearest major city from the Bandaranaike International Airport (about 9 km distance).

Negombo is a major commercial centre in the country and the largest city in Gampaha District, and is also the administrative centre of Negombo Division. Negombo has a population of about 142,136 within its divisional secretariat division. Negombo municipal boundary is fully extended throughout its Divisional Secretariat area.

Negombo is known for its long sandy beaches and centuries old fishing industry. Negombo has a large bilingual (Sinhala/Tamil) population with a large Christian majority.

== Etymology ==
The name "Negombo" is the Portuguese corruption of its Tamil name Neerkolombu. (Note: Excerpt for the etymology of Negombo from "Proceedings". International Association of Tamil Research, Department of Indian Studies, University of Malaya. 1968. p. 481: "In this context, it may be of interest to cite a few place-names in other parts of the Island, with a Tamil origin; in the Western Coast such as Puttalam, Ciläpam (Chilaw), Nirkolumbo (Nikumpalai, Negombo), Kalattarai (Kalutara), Pãnanturai (Pãnadura), Mätarai (Matara), Teivanturai (Dondra)...")

The Sinhala name Migamuva comes from a legend mentioned in Rajaveliya. The army of King Kavantissa found bee honey in a canoe near the seashore, for Viharamahadevi who was pregnant with the prince Dutugamunu. Because of this, the place was named "Mee-Gomuwa".

== History ==
The shallow waters of the Negombo Lagoon provided safe shelter for seafaring vessels and became one of the key ports along with Kalpitiya, Puttalam, Colombo, Kalutara and Galle, from which the Sri Lankan kingdoms conducted external trade.

=== Pre-colonialism ===
The region was under the rule of the Sinhala monarchy based on Sri Jayawardanapura Kotte. The language used in the area was a regional dialect of Sinhala when the Portuguese arrived in the 16th century.

Negombo also served as a shelter for Arab vessels, whose descendants are the Sri Lankan Moors. Negombo was a major port known for its trading activity and was well known for its cinnamon cultivation. The cinnamon trade was controlled by the Sri Lankan kings and later by the Sri Lankan Moors.

=== Portuguese Ceylon ===
Landing in the early 1500s, the Portuguese overthrew the Sinhala monarchy who were forced to relocate to Seethawaka. The Portuguese constructed a fort in Negombo and took over the trade of cinnamon to the west. During the Portuguese occupation, the Karava (the dominant seafaring clan of Negombo), who were previously Buddhist and Hindu were converted into Catholicism. Due to the sheer amount of conversions to Catholicism, present-day Negombo is sometimes known as 'Little Rome' due to nearly two thirds of its population being Catholic.

The Portuguese restructured the traditional production and management of cinnamon and maintained their control over the trade for more than a century. The decline of their power began in the 1630s when warfare between the Portuguese and the Kingdom of Kandy reached a stalemate. The King of Kandy turned to the Dutch for help.

=== Dutch Ceylon ===
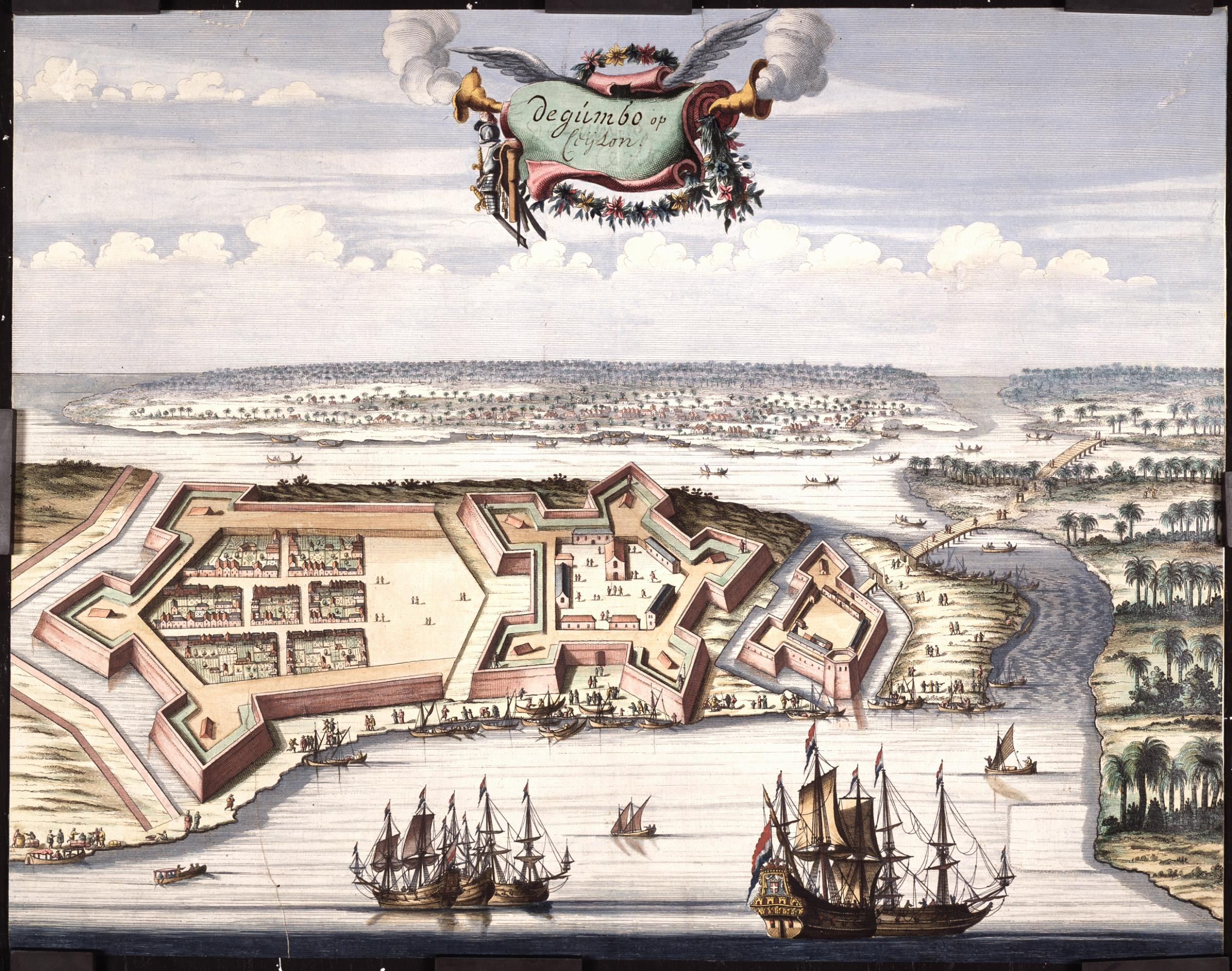
Painting by Johannes Vingboons of the Dutch fort in Negombo, c. 1665

The Dutch captured Negombo from the Portuguese in 1646 and negotiated an armistice with Portugal for ten years. During this period, the King of Kandy sought to provoke conflict between the nations by passing through the territories of the one to attack the other. On one occasion, he captured the fort of Negombo and sent the head of the Dutch commander, Adrian Vander Stell, to his countrymen in Galle. Although the Dutch managed to regain control of Negombo from the King by diplomatic means, hostilities continued. In particular, the disruption of the cinnamon trade was a favourite method of the King to harass the Dutch.

Throughout the eighteenth century, the demand for cinnamon from Ceylon outstripped the supply, and its quality appeared to have suffered. Other factors, including the continued hostility from the Kandyan Kingdom and a rival cinnamon exporter in the form of China, led to a 40% decline in the volume of cinnamon exported between 1785 and 1791, despite attempts to clear land around Negombo and create cinnamon plantations.

The legacy of the Dutch colonial era can be seen in the Negombo fort, constructed in 1672, and other Dutch buildings, including churches and the extensive canal system that runs 120 km (75 mi) from Colombo in the south, through Negombo to Puttalam in the north.

=== British Ceylon ===
By the time the British commander Colonel Stuart took over the cinnamon trade in 1796, it was clear that the industry was in decline. Poor policies put in place by Frederick North the first Governor of British Ceylon exacerbated the problem. By the 1830s, commercial interest had moved elsewhere.

Following the British takeover of the Kingdom of Kandy in 1815, Negombo lost its strategic value as an outpost of Colombo. However, it continued to develop in commercial influence. The Negombo fishery was at the heart of the seafood trade in Ceylon, and many migrant fisherman arrived annually with the profits of their ventures going into the small, prosperous town. In 1907 Negombo was connected to the massive railway project that was linking the island together under British control and encouraging the growth of plantations in coconuts, tea and coffee.

== Geography ==
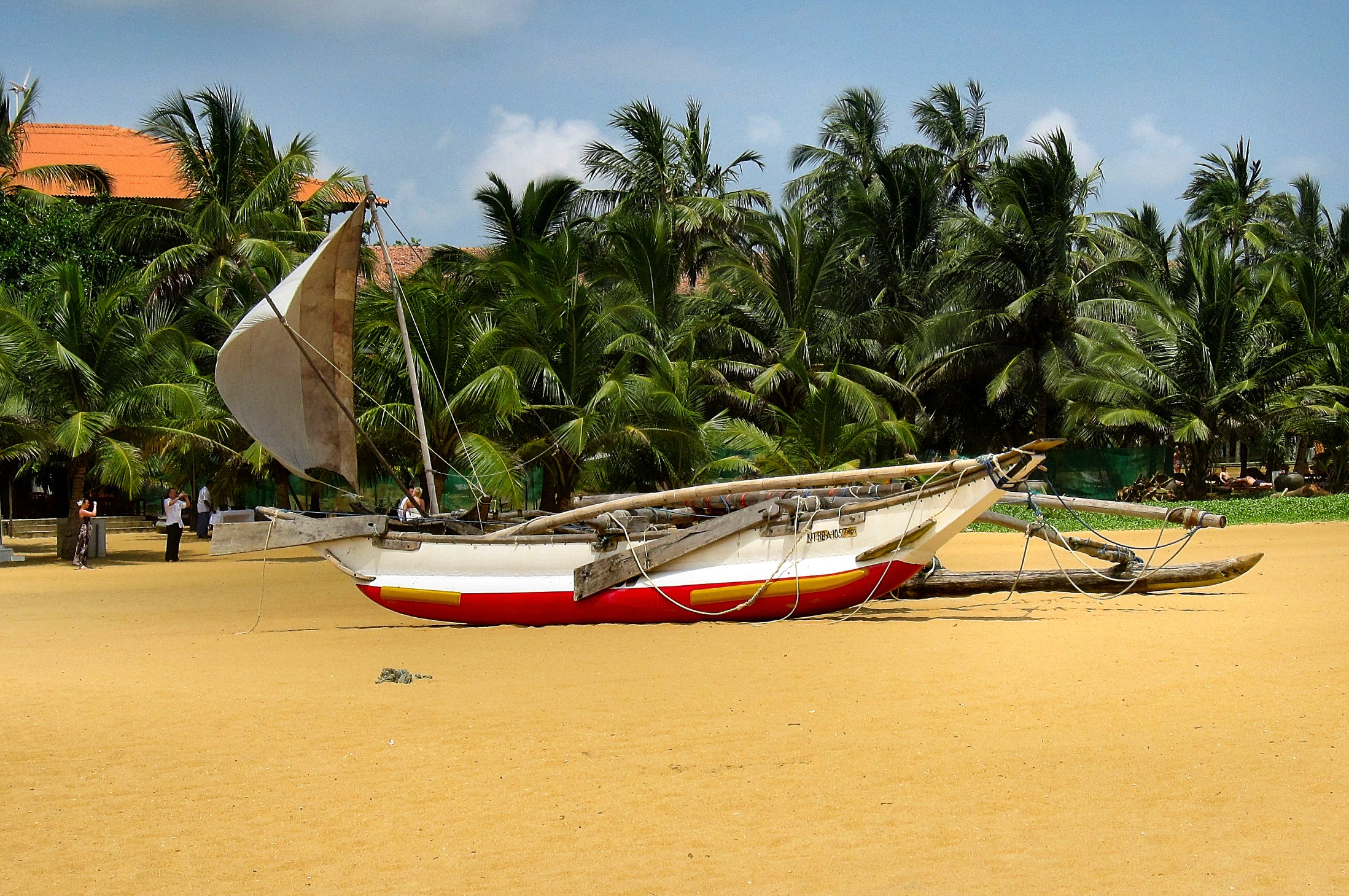
A traditional fishing boat

Negombo is about 2 metres (6 ft 7 in) above sea level, and Negombo's geography is a mix of land and water. The Hamilton Canal flows in the heart of the city. The Negombo Lagoon is one of the most scenic landmarks of Negombo. There are over 190 species of wildlife and plenty of birds in its mangroves. The northern border of the city is formed by the Maha Oya river which meets the Indian Ocean.

=== Climate ===
Negombo features a tropical rainforest climate under the Köppen climate classification. The city receives rainfall mainly from the Southwestern monsoons from May to August and October to January. During the remaining months there is a little precipitation due to Convective rains. The average annual precipitation is about 2,400 millimetres (94 in). The average temperature varies 24 °C (75 °F) to 30 °C (86 °F), and there are high humidity levels from February to April.

Climate data for Negombo, Sri Lanka
Month	Jan	Feb	Mar	Apr	May	Jun	Jul	Aug	Sep	Oct	Nov	Dec	Year
Mean daily maximum °C (°F)	30 (86)	31 (88)	31 (88)	31 (88)	31 (88)	29 (84)	29 (84)	29 (84)	29 (84)	29 (84)	29 (84)	29 (84)	30 (86)
Mean daily minimum °C (°F)	22 (72)	22 (72)	23 (73)	24 (75)	26 (79)	25 (77)	25 (77)	25 (77)	25 (77)	24 (75)	23 (73)	22 (72)	24 (75)
Average precipitation mm (inches)	89 (3.5)	69 (2.7)	147 (5.8)	231 (9.1)	371 (14.6)	224 (8.8)	135 (5.3)	109 (4.3)	160 (6.3)	348 (13.7)	315 (12.4)	147 (5.8)	2,345 (92.3)

=== Zones ===
- Athgala
- Basiyawatte
- Bolawalana
- Dalupotha
- Daluwakotuwa
- Dungalpitiya
- Duwa
- Duwane
- Ethukala
- Kadolkale
- Kamachchodai
- Kandawala
- Kapumgoda
- Kattuwa
- Katunayake
- Katuwapitiya
- Kimbulapitiya
- Kochchikade
- Kurana
- Kudapadu
- Mahahunupitiya, also known as Maha Hunupitiya, a predominantly Catholic neighborhood
- Munnakkarai
- Muruthena
- Nugawala
- Palangathura
- Pallansena
- Periyamulla
- Pitipana
- Poruthota
- Raheemanabad
- Sarakkuwa
- Sellakanda
- Thillanduwa
- Thaladuwa
- Thalahena
- Udyar Thoppu
- Wella veediya
- Welihena
- Kadirana
- Akkarapanaha
- Thimbirigaskatuwa
- Katana

=== Neighbourhoods ===
- Depot Junction
- Dheen Junction
- Galkanda Junction
- Koppara Junction
- Light Mill Junction
- Pankada Junction
- Periyamulla Junction
- Taladuwa Junction
- Telwatta Junction
- Temple Junction

=== Negombo Lagoon ===
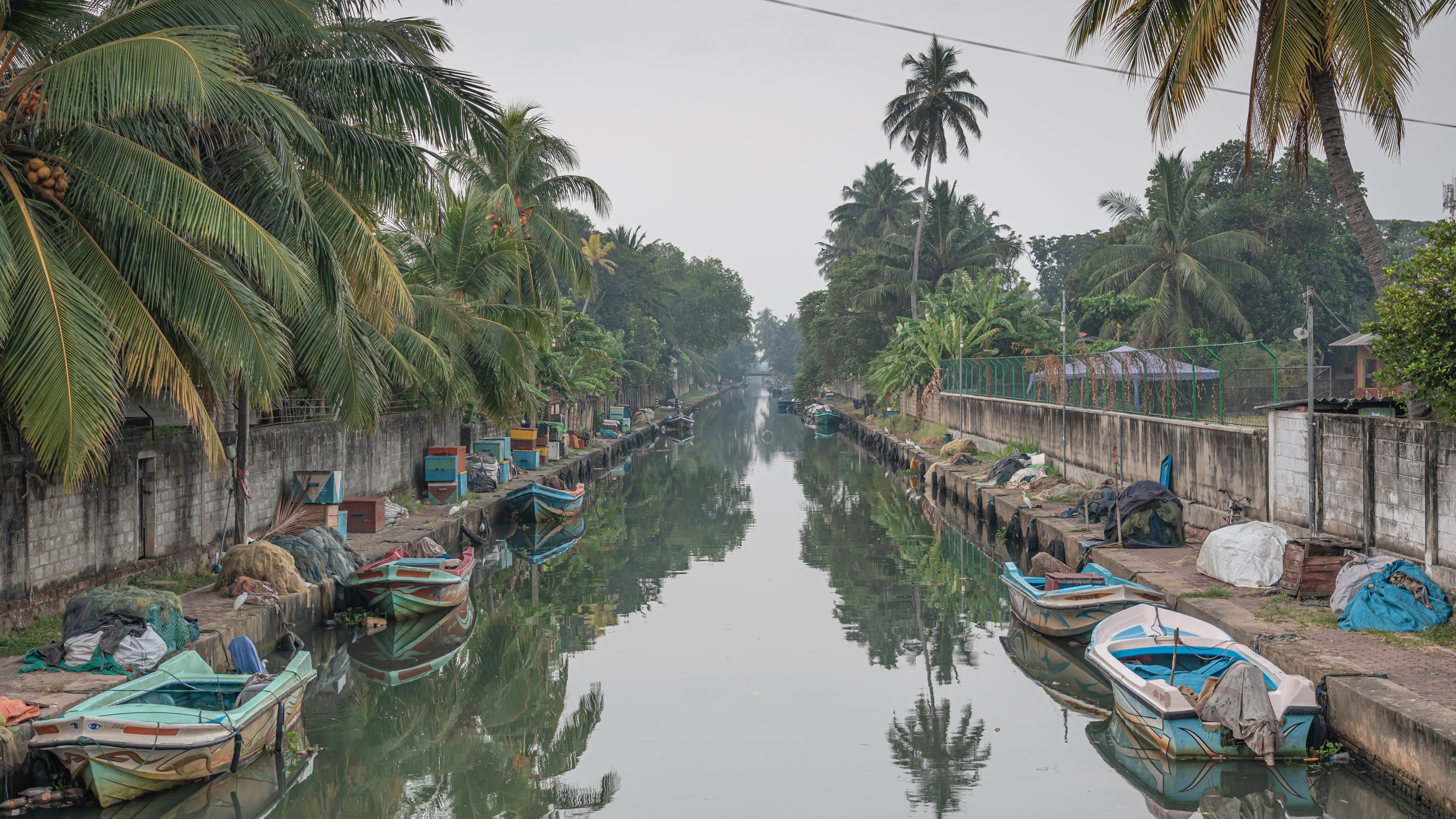
Built by the Dutch to transport spices, now used by the local fisherman to get to the sea, Dutch canal in Negombo

The Negombo lagoon is large semi-enclosed coastal water body with plenty of natural resources. The lagoon is fed by number of small rivers and the Hamilton Canal (also known as the Dutch canal). It is linked to the Indian Ocean by a narrow channel to the north, near Negombo. The lagoon and the marsh land area also support local agriculture and forestry. It has extensive mangrove swamps and attracts a wide variety of water birds. The lagoon supports so many distinct species of flora, fauna and as well as another species of birds and variety of animals. Negombo Lagoon is a major local and tourist attraction primarily for sightseeing and boating tours.

The fishermen who are based at the Negombo lagoon live in shanty thatch palm villages along the water's edge. They rely mainly on their traditional knowledge of the seasons for their livelihood, using outrigger canoes carved out of tree trunks and nylon nets to bring in modest catches from September through April. Their boats are made in two forms – oruvas (a type of sailing canoe) and paruvas (a large, man-powered catamaran fitted with kurlon dividers). In recent years, the villagers have supplemented the income earned from fishing by collecting 'toddy', or palm sap, which is used to brew arrack.

== Demographics ==
According by the statistics of 2011, 6.3% of the population of Gampaha district live in Negombo city limits and 11.6% of the population of the district live in Negombo Metropolis. It is a multi-ethnic and multi-cultural city. Most of Negombo's residents belong to the Sinhalese majority. There are Tamil and Muslim people also living in the city as well as a long established Chinese community.

Religious Identification in Negombo
	2012 Population	Percentage
Roman Catholic	92,527	65.31%
Islam	20,308	14.33%
Buddhist	15,681	11.07%
Hindu	8,290	5.85%
Other Christian	4,740	3.35%
Other	130	0.09%
Total	141,676	100.00%

Ethnic Identification in Negombo
	2012 Population	Percentage
Sinhalese	107,155	75.63%
Sri Lankan Moor	19,364	13.67%
Sri Lankan Tamil	12,590	8.89%
Indian Tamil	904	0.64%
Other	599	0.42%
Burgher	414	0.29%
Baratha	281	0.20%
Malay	278	0.20%
Sri Lankan Chetty	91	0.06%
Total	141,676	100.00%

=== Religion ===
Negombo is a multi-religious city. Since the beginning of European colonisation, the township of Negombo has had a majority of Roman Catholics along with Muslims, Buddhist and Hindus. Before European invasions it was a Buddhist majority region.

==== Catholic and Christian churches ====
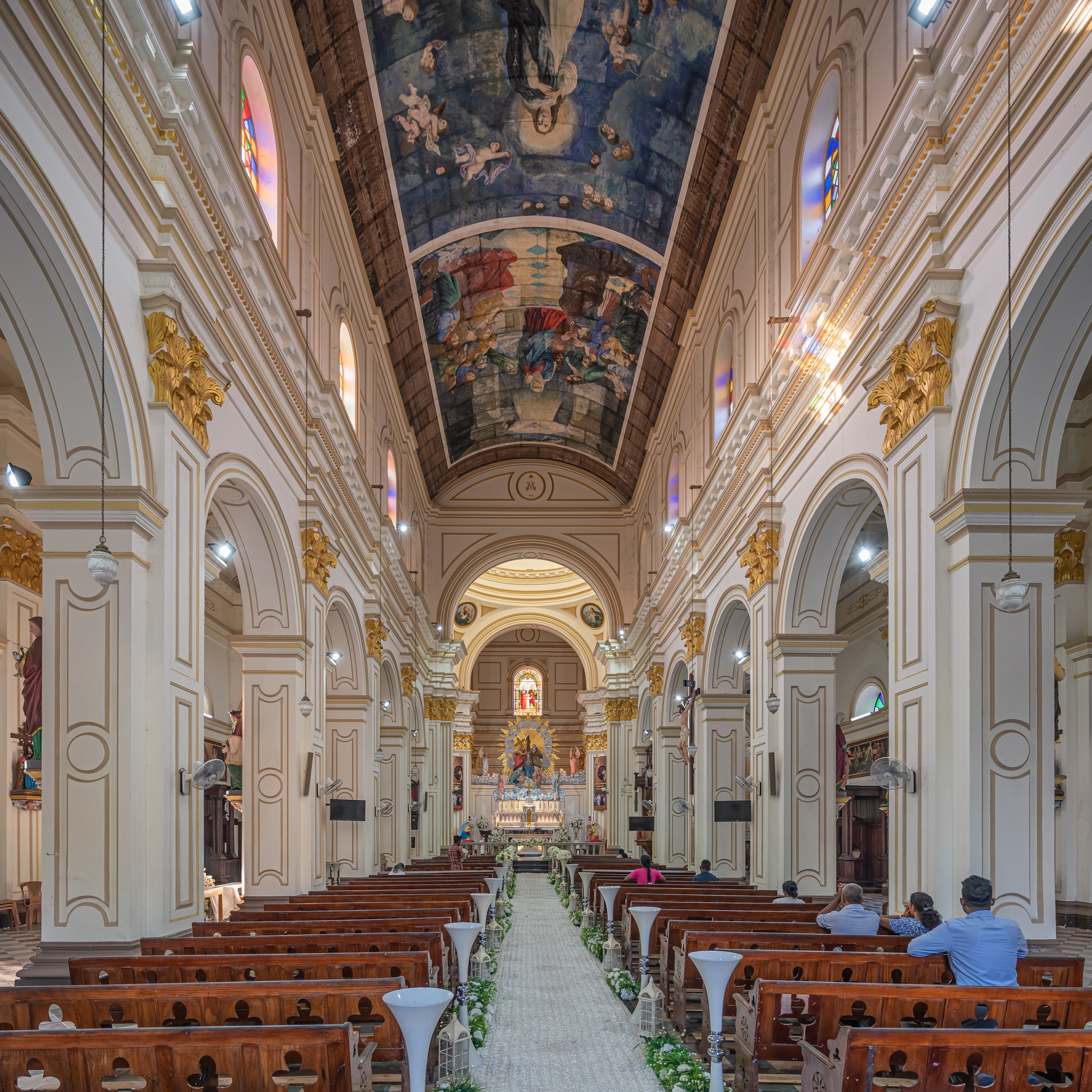
Interior of St. Mary's Church in Negombo

Negombo has been given the name "Little Rome" owing to the highly ornate Portuguese-era Roman Catholic churches such as St. Mary's Church found in the township and because of the majority of inhabitants being Roman Catholics. St. Sebastian's Church, Katuwapitiya; Saint Stephen's Church, Negombo, Grand Street; St. Mary's Church, Negombo; St. Anne's Churches at Kurana and Palangatura; St. Anthony's Church Dalupothal; and Our Lady of Sorrows Church, Kandawala, are the biggest parishes in Negombo. There are over 25 Roman Catholic churches in the city.

There is a branch of the Church of Jesus Christ of Latter-day Saints in Negombo. The church building is just west of the intersection of Ave Maria Street and Old Chilaw Street. There are also Methodist churches, Baptist churches, and the other Anglican churches in Negombo.

==== Buddhist Pansal (Buddhist temples) ====
Agurukaramulla Raja Maha Viharaya (Bodhirajaramaya) is a famous Buddhist temple bringing Buddhists from all over Sri Lanka to Negombo every year. Abhayasekararamaya Temple (Podipansala), Sri Sudarshanaramaya, Dutugamunu viharaya and Sri Buddhagaya maha viharaya are famous Buddhist temples in the city.

==== Hindu Kovil (Hindu temples) ====
There are many Hindu temples (Kovil) in Negombo: Kali Amman temple, Ganapathi (Pillaiar) Temple, Kamachchi Amman Temple, Muththumari Amman Temple, Murugan (Kandaswami) Temple, Karumari Amman Temple etc.

== Local government ==
Negombo City Local Board began in 1878. After 44 years, it became the Urban District Council on 1 January 1922. Negombo celebrated its silver jubilee of its Urban council status in grand style in February 1948. Their Royal Highnesses the Duke and Duchess of Gloucester were the main patrons on the opening day of the celebrations. The Negombo Urban Council was offered Municipal status on 1 January 1950 under the municipal ordinance of 1865.

The Negombo Municipal Council has governed the city with a mayor from the government, since 1950. Negombo's mayor and the council members are elected through the local government election held every five years. There are 29 wards in the Negombo municipal boundary. Each is represented by an elected member, but there were only 26 members before the Local Government election held in 2018. The number of municipal councillors was increased to 48 according to new local government election system introduced in 2018. where 29 members are elected form wards and the rest form a preferential list.

In the Local Government Election held in 2018, United National Party Won the Negombo Municipal council led by former Western Provincial councillor Royce Fernando by securing 19 seats and Sri Lanka Podujana Peramuna led By Dayan Lanza, brother of Nimal Lanza (MP) secured 16 Seats. The rest of seats were distributed among other political Parties and independent groups including Sri Lanka Freedom Party. Dayan Lanza became the Mayor of Negombo with the support of minor political parties and Sri Lanka Freedom Party. Royce Fernando Became the Opposition Leader in Negombo Municipal council.

== Economy ==
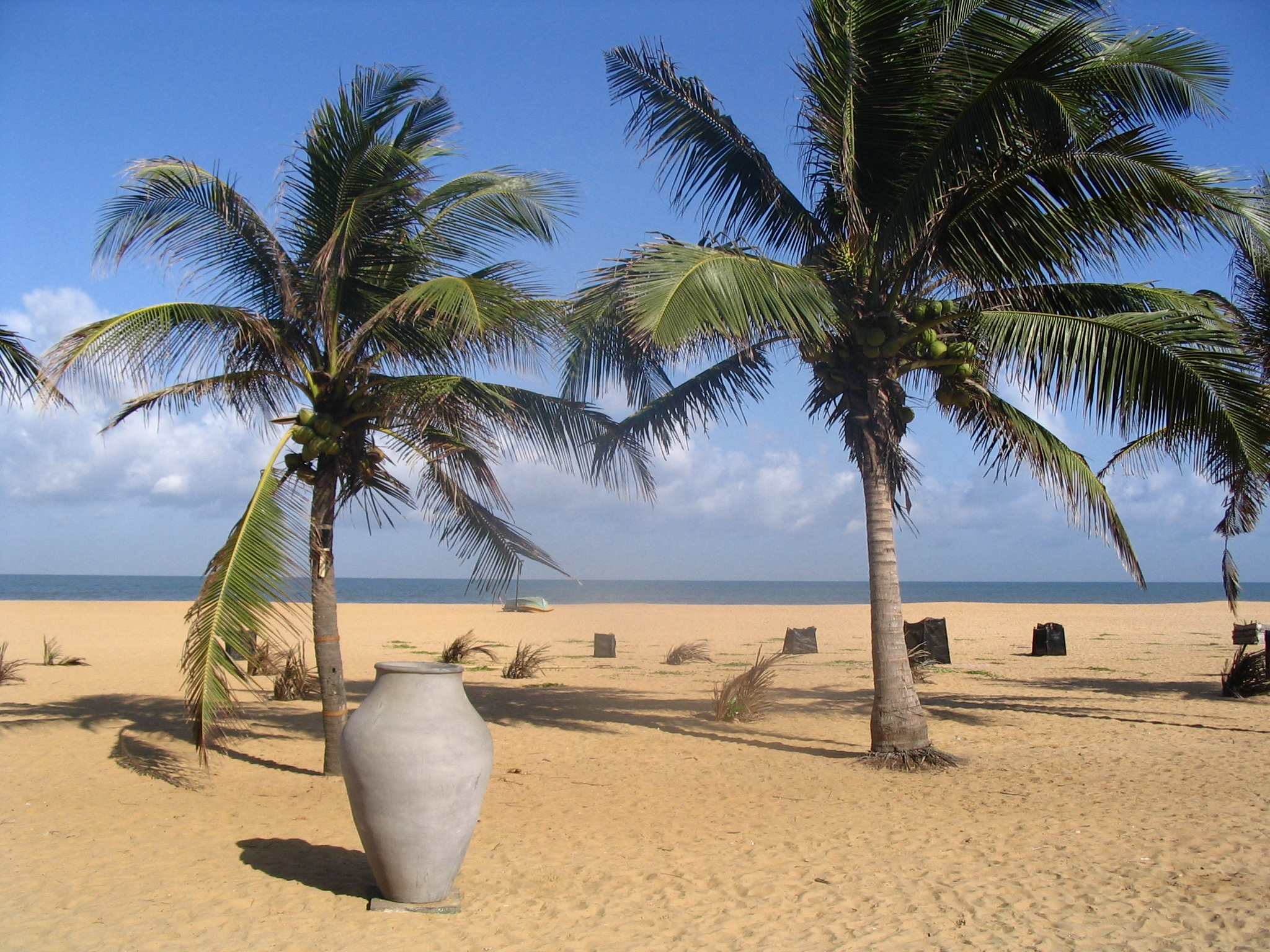
Negombo Beach

Negombo is considered one of the largest economic centres of the country. Negombo is about 4–5 km (2.5–3.1 mi) from the Bandaranaike International Airport, and the free trade zone. Negombo has a moderate port (used during the periods of Portuguese and Dutch colonisation)

The economy of Negombo is mainly based on tourism and its centuries-old fishing industry, though it also produces cinnamon, ceramics, and brass ware.

The Colombo Stock Exchange-Negombo branch and many major financial corporations have their key branches in Negombo. There are department stores, large supermarkets, and boutiques in the bustling streets of Downtown Negombo and international food outlets are being opened.

== Transport ==
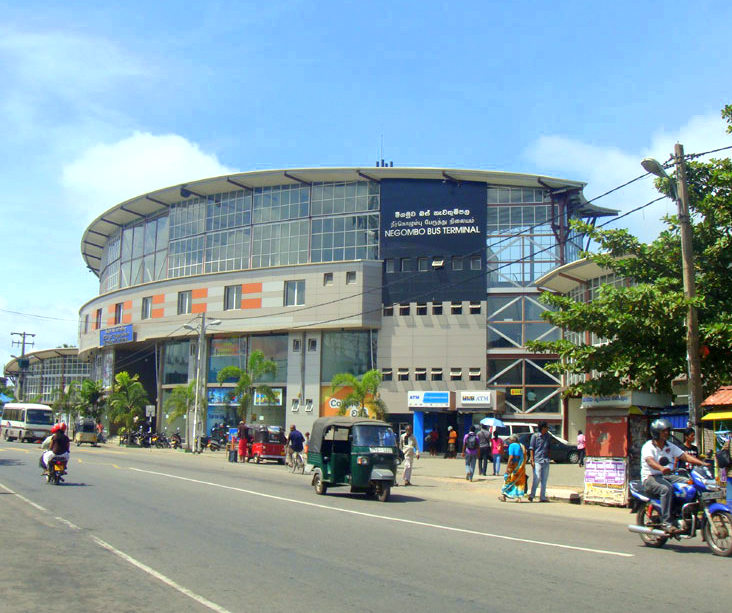
Negombo bus terminal

The E03 - Airport Expressway opened in 2013 links the capital Colombo through the Katunayake Interchange with Negombo minimising travelling time to approximately 20 to 30 minutes. The Katunayake Interchange from Negombo takes about 5 to 10 minutes (approximately 4 km (2.5 mi)).

There are highway bus services running between from Negombo to Pettah, Maharagama via Airport Expressway. Negombo to Galle, Kataragama and Matara (the southern tip of the country) using the Southern Expressway. And also bus services provided Negombo to Kadawatha, Kottawa, Panadura and Moratuwa using the Outer Circular Expressway

The A3 Colombo–Negombo highway road from Colombo, goes through Negombo, extends to Jaffna, and Trincomalee via Anuradhapura. Negombo is connected with some of the B grade roads from Ja-Ela, Kurunegala, Mirigama, Nittambuwa and Giriulla, and there is a good road network in and around Negombo.

The Bus Terminal complex of Negombo has multiple facilities for passengers and public. It is served by many bus routes, connecting with some major destinations in the country, provided Negombo to Colombo, Kandy, Kegalle, Kataragama, Hatton, Kalpitiya, Chilaw, Kurunegala, Puttalam, Avissawella, and Kaluthara.

Due to Negombo being situated along A3 Highway Road, it is served by many bus routes from Colombo to Northern and North western points of Sri Lanka including Jaffna, Anuradhapura, Vavuniya, Kilinochchi, Mullaitivu, Mannar, Point Pedro, Nikaweratiya, Panduwasnuwara, Anamaduwa, Kankasanthurai, Pulmudei, Silawathurai, Velvetithurai and Padaviya.

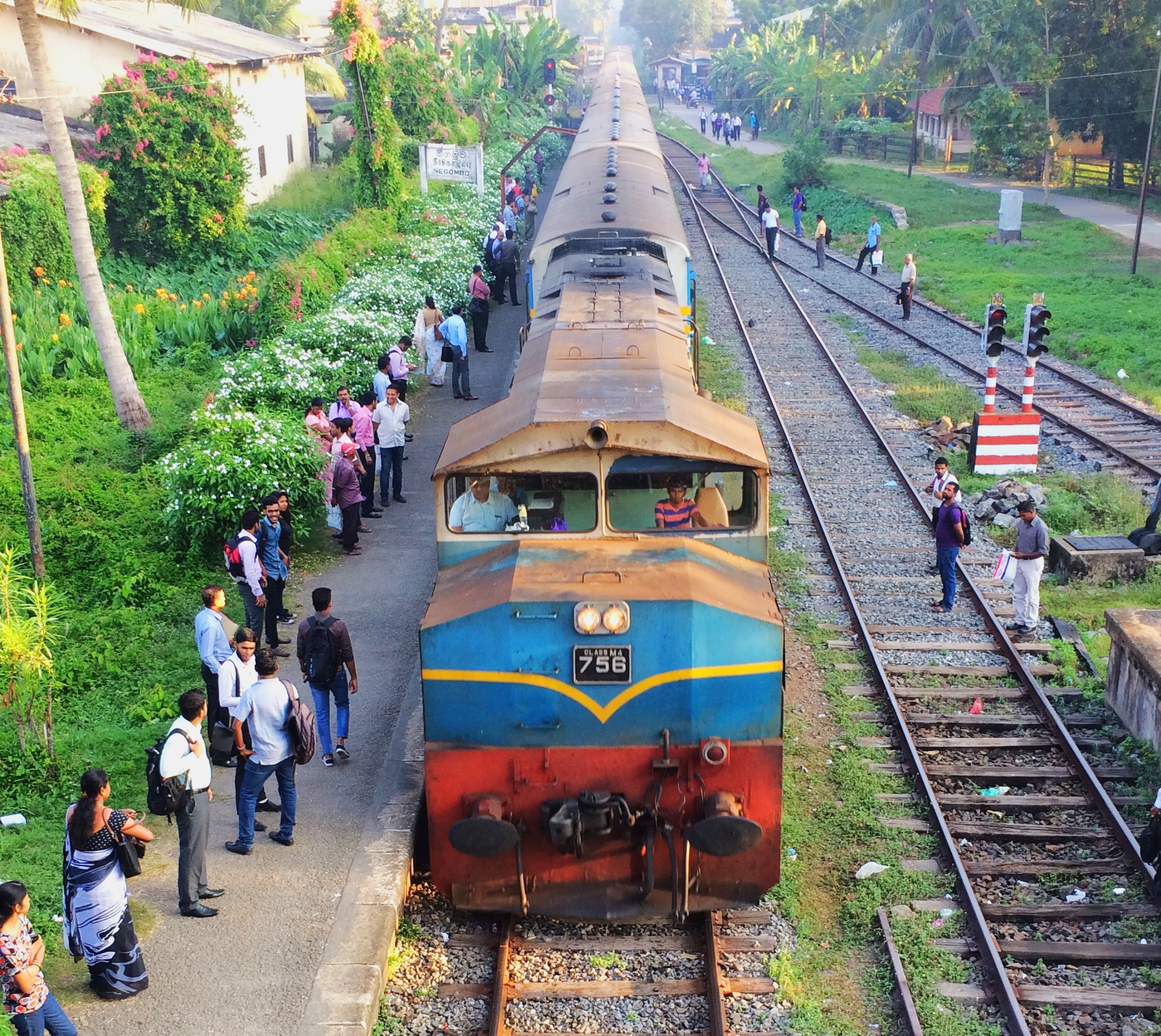
Negombo Downtown Railway Station

Four railway stations serve Negombo, they are: Kurana, Negombo Downtown, Kattuwa and Kochchikade. Negombo Downtown Station is the main railway station on the Puttalam railway line. It serves Galle, via Colombo from south and to Puttalam, via Chilaw from north. The Sri Lanka Railway Department has introduced an intercity express train between Chilaw and Colombo with stops at Negombo Downtown and Kochchikade Stations.

The Negombo Downtown Station is close to the central Bus Terminal Complex. Negombo is the closest major city to the Bandaranaike International Airport and Katunayake Interchange of the E03 - Airport Expressway.

== Education ==
Negombo is home to some of the oldest secondary educational institutes in Sri Lanka. The leading schools are listed below.

- Ave Maria Convent
- Maris Stella College
- St. Mary's College, Negombo
- Newstead Girls College
- Harischandra National College
- Loyola College
- Wijayaratnam Hindu Central College
- St Joseph's College (Negombo Branch School of St Joseph's College, Colombo 10)
- St. Peter's College (Negombo Branch School of St Peter's College, Colombo)
- Maris Stella Branch College
- Ave Maria Dominican Convent
- Al-Hilal Muslim Central College
- St. Peter's Maha Vidyalaya
- Vidyalankara Maha Vidyalaya
- St Sebastian's Maha vidyalaya, Sea Street
- St Anne's Maha Vidyalaya- Daluwakotuwa
- St. Anne's Maha Vidyalaya-Kurana
- Nimala Maria Maha Vidyalaya-Bolawalana
- Al-Falah Muslim School
- Vidyaloka Vidyalaya
- Our Lady of Miracle School
- St Joseph's Vidyalaya
- St Mary's Pitipana Maha Vidyalaya
- Kochchikade Maha Vidyalaya
- Gateway College
- St. Thomas Catholic International College
- Leeds International College
- St. Nicholas International College
- NICE International College
- Adventist International School
- OKI International School
- St. Michell's College
- Negombo International College
- Sussex College
- JMC International School
- Negombo South International School
- Wisdom International School
- Sailan International School
- Regent Language International

There are also many higher educational institutes and private tuition institutes in Negombo: Ocean University of Sri Lanka Negombo faculty conducts Nautical Engineering, Marine Science, Fisheries and other degree programmes. BCI Campus, Regent Language School, American College of Higher Education, IPM Institute of Sri Lanka, ESOFT Metro Campus, AIMS College, ACBS, ACCHE, SLIMM, Australian Higher Educational Centre, Electro Technical Institute and Don Bosco Technical College are some of them.

== Notable people ==
=== During British Ceylon ===
- Mudaliyar John de Silva Wijegooneratne Rajapakshe JP (1841–1909)
- Muhammed Thamby Samsudheen Vidane Arachchi a.k.a. Dheen Arachchi (1860–1915), the Vidane Arachchi of Negombo from 1896 to 1915, the highest position held by a Muslim in Negombo in the Native Headmen System. After completing the Cambridge Senior Examination he got involved in managing the family estates before being appointed as the Vidane Arachchi. Dheen Junction in Negombo is named after him. Udayar Thoppuwa Mosque at Dheen Junction in Negombo was built by his father Maththicham Saleem Lebbe Muhammed Thamby Vidane (1819–1879) in 1846. The Masjid is maintained by his descendants, who continue to preserve the original building.
- Gate Mudaliyar A. E. Rajapakse OBE (13 March 1866 – 20 September 1937), was the first chairman of the Negombo Urban Council (1922–1923, 1925–1934). Rajapakse Park and Rajapakse Broadway in Negombo are named after him.He is the eldest son of Mudliyar John de Silva Wijegooneratne Rajapakshe (1841–1909).
- Samsudheen M. Abdul Raheeman JPUM (1896–1965), was the first Muslim chairman of the Negombo Urban Council (20 November 1941 – 31 December 1943). He was the second Muslim (first was his elder brother S. I. Dheen) to qualify as a lawyer in Negombo and was the 8th (1st Muslim) President (1948–1958) of the Negombo Law Society. Raheemanabad in Periyamulla Negombo is named after him. He is the fourth child of Muhammed Thamby Samsudheen Vithane Arachchi a.k.a. Dheen Arachchi (1860–1915).
- William Mohotti Munasinghe (1902–1962), Aide-de-camp to the British Governor and Mudaliyar of Negombo
- Mudaliyar Thenahandi David Mendis (1904–1977), MBE, was Mayor of Negombo from 1965 to 1970 and a prominent entrepreneur. He was the founder and owner of the Wijaya Bus Company, which was nationalised on 1 January 1958 with the creation of the Ceylon Transport Board (CTB). He was the father of T. Wijayapala Mendis (Government Minister, Member of Parliament, and Mayor of Negombo) and T. Nandana Mendis (Provincial Councillor and Chief Minister of the Western Province in 2005). 'Mudaliyar Mendis Mawatha' in Negombo is named after him.

=== During Dominion Ceylon ===
- Thomas Cooray (28 December 1901 – 29 October 1988), first indigenous Archbishop of Colombo (1947–1976) and first Sri Lankan Cardinal (1965–1988).
- Alexander Nicholas de Abrew Abeysinge CBE, JPUM (1 May 1894 – 15 September 1963) was elected as the first Mayor of the Negombo Municipal Council in January 1950
- Thenahandi Wijayapala Hector Mendis (16 December 1928 – 1 September 2012), was elected the Mayor of Negombo in 1954 and entered Parliament in 1960 from the Katana electorate as a UNP candidate. He was appointed Minister of Textile Industries in 1977, in 1989 he became the Minister of Transport and Highways, In 1993 he was appointed Leader of the House and in 1994 he became the Chief Opposition Whip in Parliament which he served till 1998. He was the third child of Mudliyar T. David Mendis of Negombo.Wijayapala Mendis Road in Negombo is named after him.

=== During Republic of Sri Lanka ===
- Frank Marcus Fernando (19 October 1931 – 24 August 2009), served as Bishop of the Roman Catholic Diocese of Chilaw (1972–2006).
- Nicholas Fernando (6 December 1932 – 10 April 2020), served as Archbishop of the Roman Catholic Archdiocese of Colombo (1977–2002).
- Ranjan Ramanayake (11 March 1963), was an actor, director and screenwriter before entering Parliament in 2010 as the member for Ratnapura. In 2015 he was elected as a member for Gampaha. He served as the State Minister of Highways and Road Development (2018–2019).

== See also ==
- Negombo Lagoon
- Bandaranaike International Airport
- Colombo-Katunayake Expressway
- Kandawala
- Negombo Tamils
- Bharatakula
- RAF Negombo
- Place names in Sri Lanka
