= St. Mary's Church, Negombo =

Roman Catholic church in Negombo, Sri Lanka

Coordinates: 7.201°N 79.838°E

St. Mary’s Church
- Sinhala: සාන්ත මරියා දේවස්ථානය
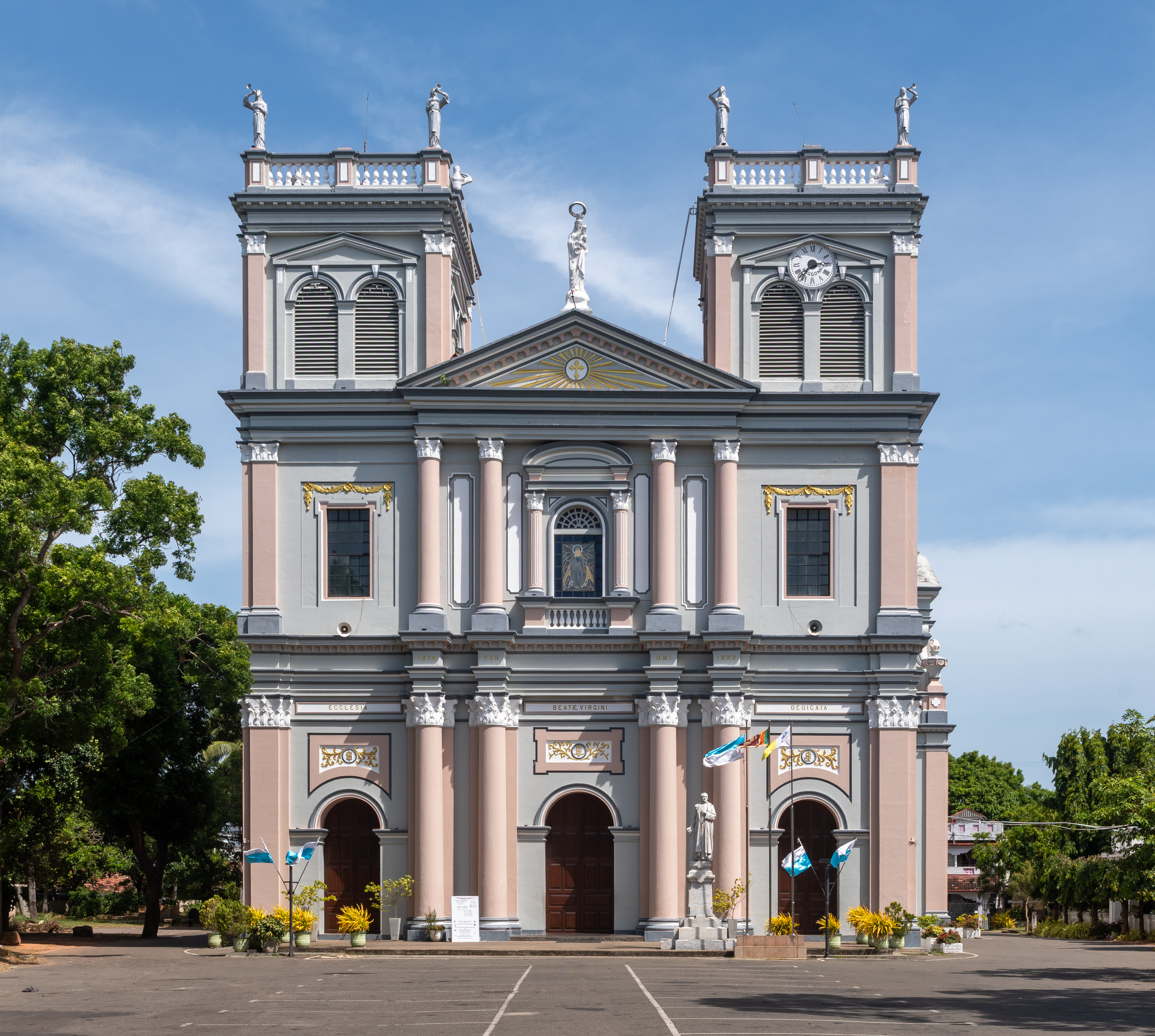
- St. Mary’s Church, Negombo

Religion
- Affiliation: Roman Catholic
- Rite: Latin Rite
- Status: Active

Location
- Location: Negombo, Sri Lanka
- Interactive map of St. Mary’s Church

Architecture
- Type: Church
- Style: Neoclassicism
- Groundbreaking: 1874
- Completed: 1922

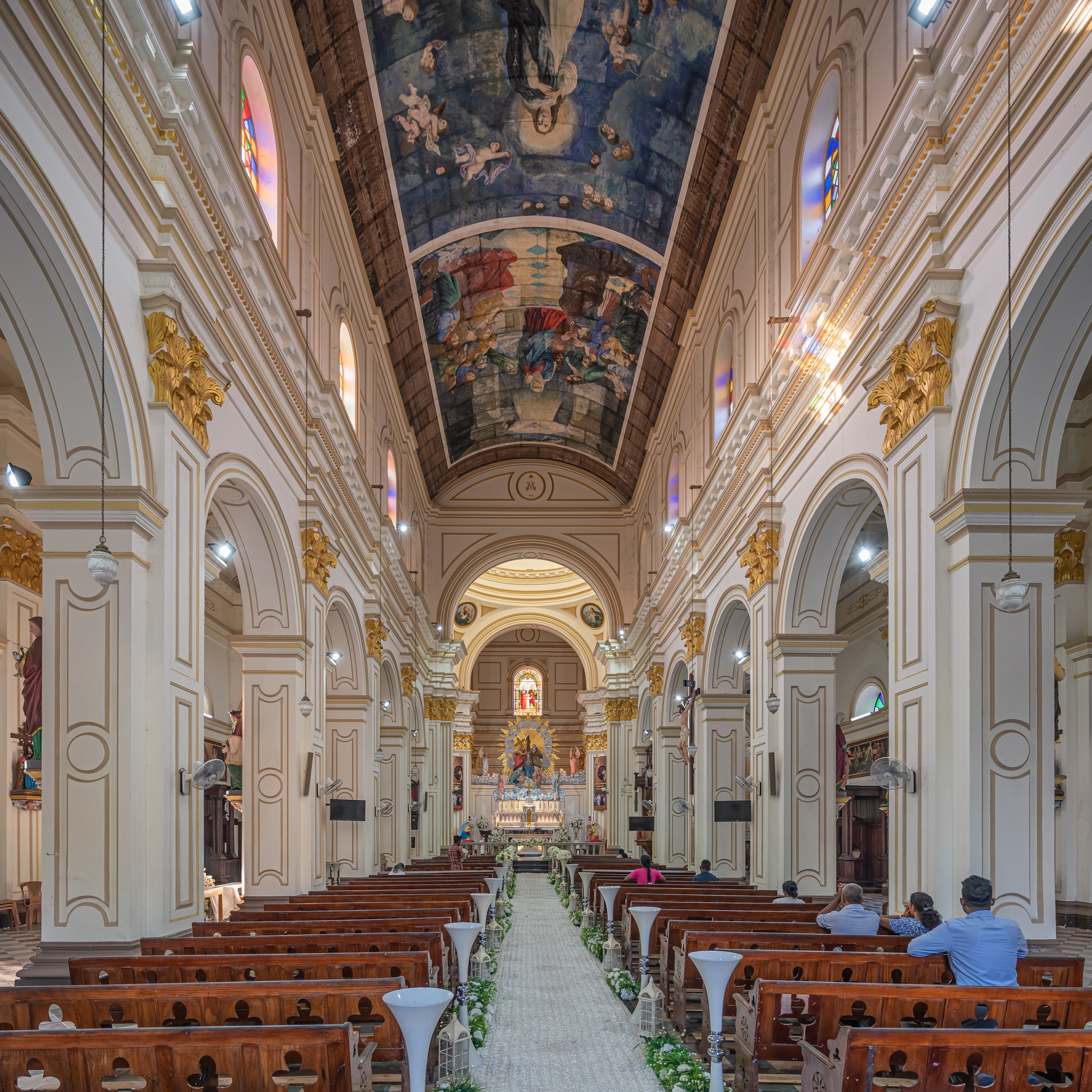
Interior of the church

St. Mary's Church is a landmark edifice, a Roman Catholic church in the heart of Negombo. It is one of the largest Catholic church in Sri Lanka.

== Location ==
St. Mary's Church is located in the Grand Street in the centre of Negombo.

== History ==
Negombo has been influenced greatly by the Christian faith since the Portuguese occupation, earning it the nickname "Little Rome" due to the numerous churches in the city.

Construction of St. Mary's Church, the fifth on this site, began in 1874 and was completed in 1922. The first church was established in 1544, marking over 480 years of Christian presence in the area. The art and architecture of this church exemplify the cultural amalgamation of European practices with Sri Lankan art during the early 20th century.

== Features ==
The church was built in neoclassicism style with columns and plain walls. Its ceilings are painted with alabaster images of many saints. The walls at the upper level are fixed with sculptures of religious saints. The unique paintings on the life of Christ on the ceiling were done by the N.S. Godamanne, a local Buddhist painter. The beauty of the paintings on the nave is described as "thunderous". A testator paid the cost of one of the altars, which was imported from Europe.

== Bibliography ==
- Atkinson, Brett (2009). Sri Lanka. Lonely Planet. ISBN 978-1-74104-835-3.
- Cummings, Joe (2006). Sri Lanka. Ediz. Inglese. Lonely Planet. ISBN 978-1-74059-975-7.
- Guides, Insight (2 November 2015). Insight Guides: Sri Lanka. APA. ISBN 978-1-78005-545-9.
- Pinto, Leonard (14 July 2015). Being a Christian in Sri Lanka: Historical, Political, Social, and Religious Considerations. Balboa Press. ISBN 978-1-4525-2862-5.
- Śrēṣṭhādhikaraṇaya, Sri Lanka. (1974). Reports of Sri Lanka Tax Cases: Containing Cases Decided by the Supreme Court of Sri Lanka (Ceylon) and Her Majesty the Queen in Her Privy Council on Appeal from the Supreme Court of Sri Lanka (Ceylon) on Income Tax, Excess Profits Duty, Profits Tax, Personal Tax, Business Turnover Tax, Surcharge on Income Tax, Estate Duty, and Stamp Duty. Department of Inland Revenue.
