= Pinwatta =

Town in Western Province, Sri Lanka

Coordinates: 06°41′25″N 79°54′45″E

Pinwatta is a coastal town in Sri Lanka. It lies in Western Province.

== Transport ==
The town is served by a railway station on the Sri Lanka Railways.

== See also ==
- Transport in Sri Lanka
- Railway stations in Sri Lanka
