= Sri Lankan Passion Plays =

Sri Lankan Passion Plays are the more than 300-year-old Sri Lankan tradition of presenting Passion Plays on stage. Negombo is the main city preserving this form of traditional drama. There is another tradition, known as 'Wasapuwa', which involves performing Saint Sebastian's life story. It is very popular among both Christians and non-Christians in Sri Lanka; however, its roots can not be found in the island.

== Duwa Negombo ==
The Duwa Passion Play has a full-day programme on Good Friday. It could be the oldest and the best-known Catholic pageant in Sri Lanka, coming down from generation to generation with well-preserved traditions. The Duwa Passion Play, with a history of around 400 years, carries a legend, too. It is also a fact that the Duwa Passion Play is the oldest or the second oldest Passion Play still performed in the world after Oberammergau Passion Play. A statue of Christ formed the centerpiece of the Passion of Christ in Duwa during the last 150 to 175 years.

In the original form, the play was enacted with statues alone and it was based on the script by Fr Jacome Gonzalvez. In 1948 when Kalasoori Fr. Merciline Jayakody became the parish priest of the Church of Our Lady of Good Voyage, Duwa, he introduced a new script and used humans, instead of statues, for most of the cast. At that time the colourful Duwa Passion Play had over 250 actors, all drawn from the island hamlet of Duwa, and was considered the greatest passion show in Asia.

== Music ==
Merceline Jayakody was a composer of several Passion Plays, and his tunes were very popular among Christians in Sri Lanka. J.K.S. Perera was another composer of Passion Plays; he has created music for the Nainamadama Passion Play and collaborated with the Boralasssa Passion Play. Lesly Rafayel has composed music for the Yagaya Passion Play done by Kadnawala parish.

Composer Dinesh Subasinghe contributed to the Passion Play music of Sri Lanka by combining world music styles (such as Gregorian chants, western classical music, and Portuguese sounds) with Sri Lankan folk tunes. As of 2013, Dinesh has done scores for 16 Passion Plays. Dinesh re-orchestrated the music of Duwa's historical Passion Play in 2009. He also composed music for Katu Otunna: It is a popular stage drama based on the story of Jesus which was directed by Clement Fernadao, a student of Edhiriweera Sarathchandra. The main folk tunes of this play were sung by Sri Lankan vocalist Nanda Malini.

== Tharakayano ==
For the first time in 400 years of world Passion Play history, the people in Negombo (Sri Lanka), mostly Catholics, witnessed a change concerning the biblical content and the form of the Passion Play tradition with the dramatic presentation of a performance in ballet style titled Tharakayano on 29 April 2016 at Kadolkele grounds, Negombo. Tharakayano is the Sinhala name for Jesus Christ.

Nearly 250 boys and girls performed characters in Tharakayano. Namal Weveldeniya was the choreographer. Prabath Aloka was the director and music composer. Ranil Fernando, a sculptor of Christian statues, was the stage director and costume designer. Wijith Rohan, of the University of Kelaniya, scripted Tharakayano.

In keeping with the age-old Passion Play tradition, Tharakayano begins with the creation story and the fall of Adam and Eve as depicted in the Book of Genesis in the Bible. Much emphasis is given to the story of Exodus which is the real passion story of the Bible. It is Jesus, the new Moses, who liberates the oppressed people of the world as God brought freedom to the slaves of Israel through Moses by releasing them from the fetters of the oppressor, the Egyptian king, Pharaoh. The 'Crossing of the Red Sea' is the Passover from slavery to freedom, Tharakayano ends with the scene on the 'Road to Emmaus', which depicts the resurrection and the ascension of Jesus.
