= Negombo Lagoon =

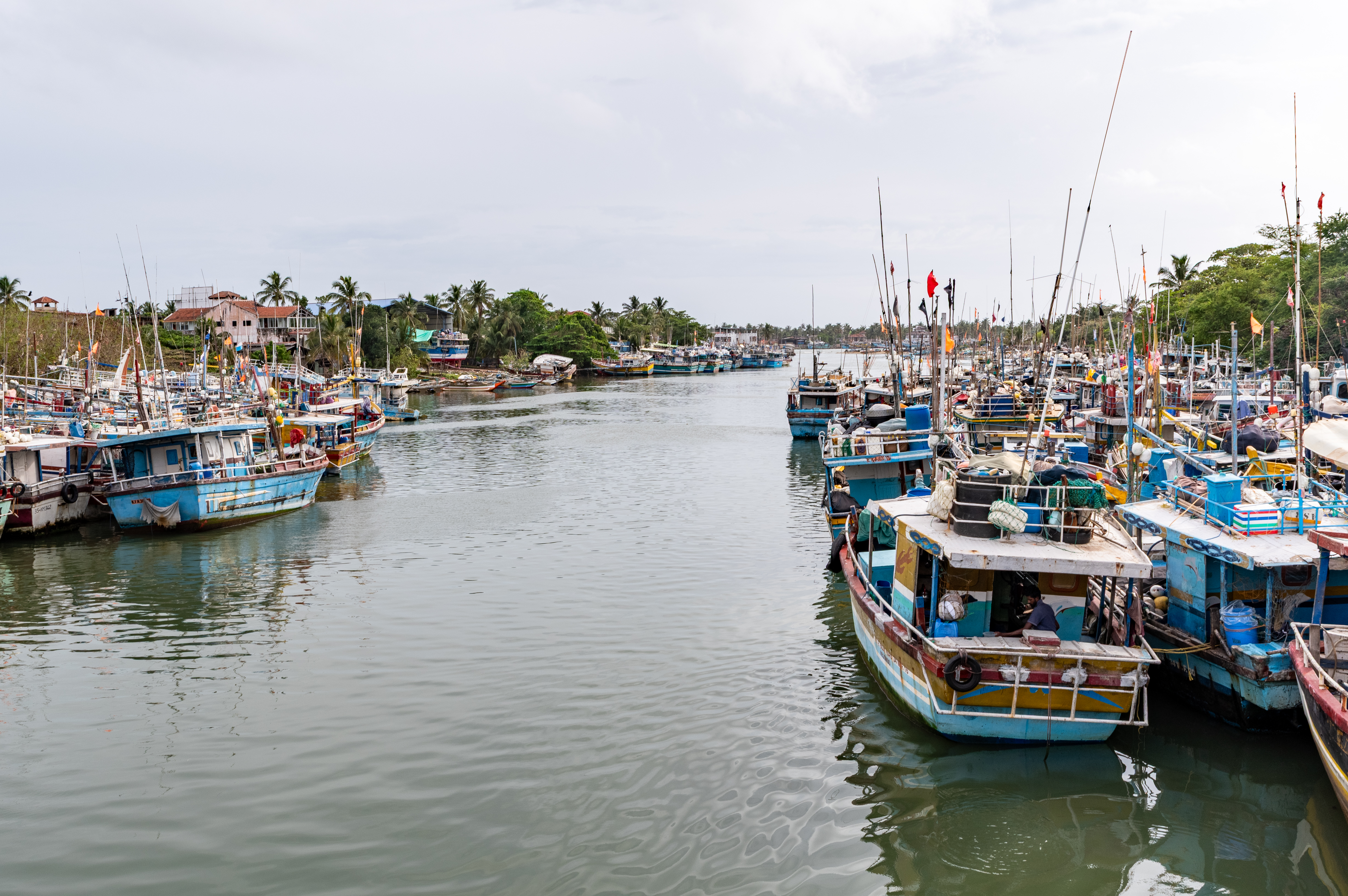
- Fishing boats in Negombo Lagoon

- Location within Sri Lanka
- Location: Western Province, Sri Lanka
- Coordinates: 7°09′N 79°51′E
- Type: Lagoon
- Primary inflows: Ja-Ela; Attanagalu Oya; Old Dutch Canal
- Primary outflows: Indian Ocean
- Surface area: 35.02 square kilometres (13.52 sq mi)
- Max. depth: 1 metre (3.3 ft)
- Surface elevation: Sea level
- Settlements: Negombo

Negombo Lagoon is a large estuarine lagoon in Negombo, south-west Sri Lanka.

The lagoon is fed by a number of small rivers and the Hamilton Canal (also known as the Dutch canal). It is linked to the sea by a narrow channel to the north, near Negombo city. It is surrounded by a densely populated region containing rice paddies, coconut plantations and grassland. The land is used for fishing and agriculture. The lagoon has extensive mangrove swamps and attracts a wide variety of water birds including cormorants, herons, egrets, gulls, terns and other waders. Negombo, Katunayake, Seeduwa are some nearby towns. Lagoon fishing is popular among the fishing community in Negombo. Lagoon crabs and lagoon prawns are in high taste and demand.

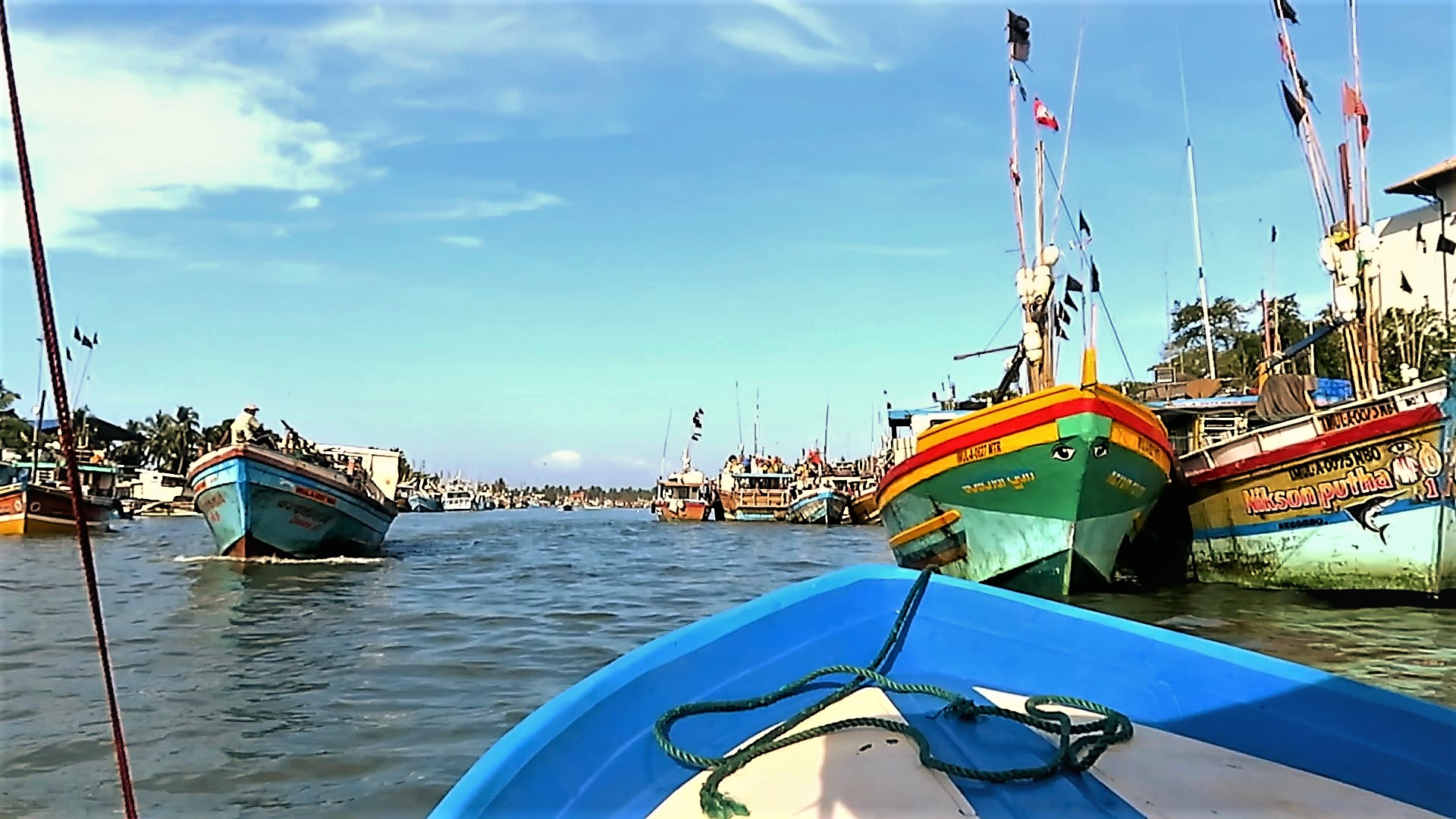
Negombo Lagoon natural harbour

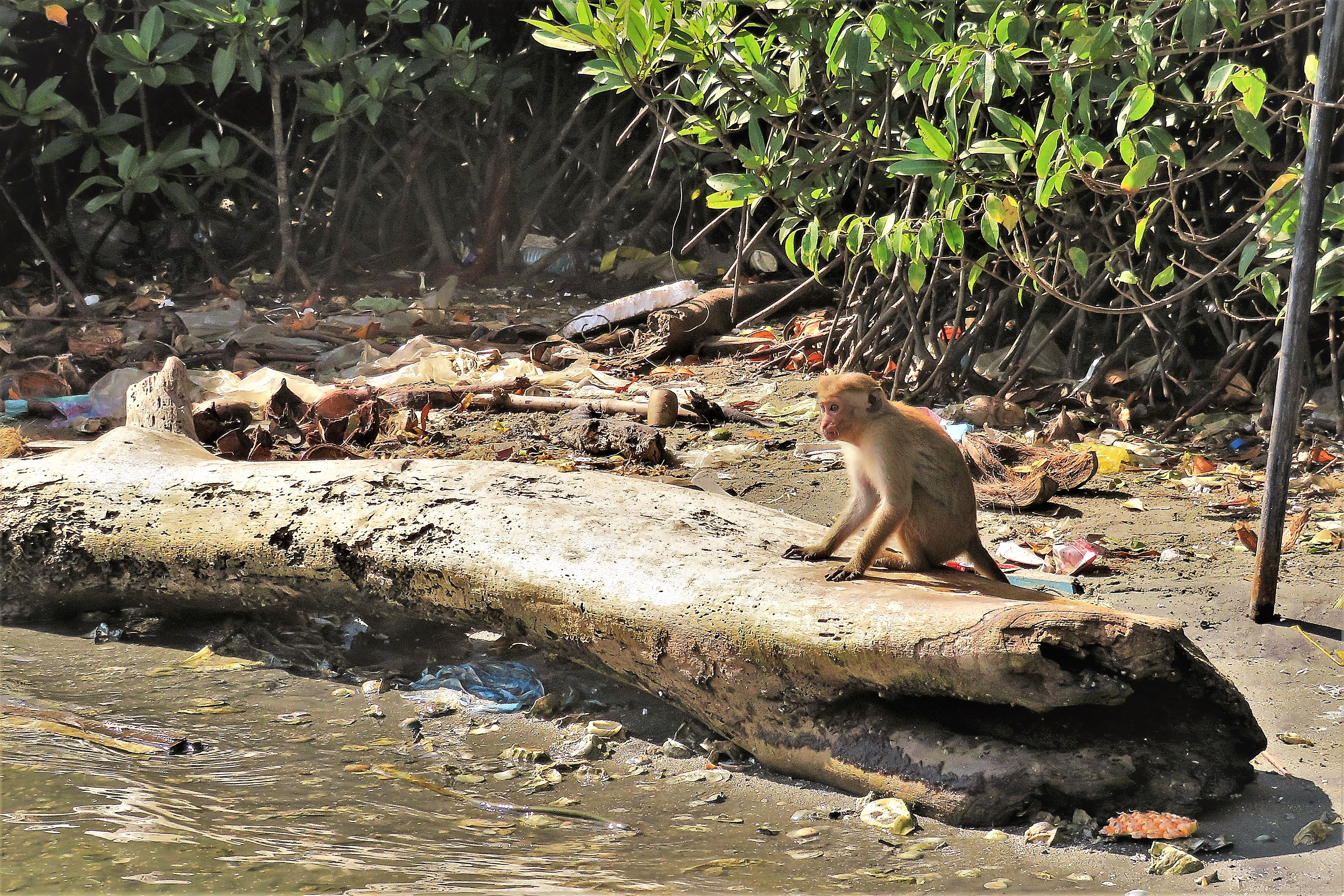
Negombo Lagoon Wildlife
