= List of Archaeological Protected Monuments in Gampaha District =

This is a list of Archaeological Protected Monuments in Gampaha District, Sri Lanka.

| Monument | Image | Location | Grama Niladhari Division | Divisional Secretary's Division | Registered | Description | Refs |
|---|---|---|---|---|---|---|---|
| Aluthepola Vihara | | Aluthepola | | Divulapitiya | 22 November 2002 | Survey Tower in the Vihara premisses | |
| Ambagahahena cave | | Yongammulla | | Mahara | 22 November 2002 | The drip ledged cave at Ambagahahena land premisses | |
| Ambagahalanda watta Walawwa | | Kotadeniyawa | | Divulapitiya | 1 July 2005 | Old Walawwa | |
| Ambagaspitiya Ambalama | | Ambagaspitiya | Pahalatutthiripitiya | Mahara | 22 November 2002 | At 3rd miles stone | |
| Ancient Gal - Edanda | | Dadagamuwa | No. 328D Thalgasmote | Attanagalla | 23 February 2007 | Ancient Gal - Edanda (Bridge) laid across Othe Ela | |
| Ancient Pond | | | Pahalakaragahamuna North | Mahara | 23 February 2007 | Pond with column base situated in the land of Mr. D. V. Wickramasingha | |
| Asgiriya Rajamaha Vihara, Gampaha | | Asgiriya, Gampaha | | Minuwangoda | 22 November 2002 | The Cave temple and stone inscription | |
| Attanagalla Raja Maha Vihara | | Attanagalla | | Attanagalla | 1 November 1996 | Ancient Image house | |
| Awariyawala Ambalama | | Awariyawala | Pahalatutthiripitiya | Mahara | 22 November 2002 | Ambalama on pillars | |
| Balagalla Saraswathi Pirivena | | Balagalla | | Divulapitiya | 18 June 1999 | Ancient image house | |
| Balagalla Walawwa | | Balagalla | | Divulapitiya | 18 June 1999 | Old Walawwa | |
| Bandiyamulla Tombstone | | Bendiyamulla | Bendiyamulla | Gampaha | 12 June 2015 | Adjoins Miriswaththa-Gampaha highway | |
| Bogahawatta Ambalama | | Bogahawatta | No. 385 Kirindiwela | Dompe | 6 February 2009 | The pilgrims rest | |
| Bollana ancient Ambalama | | | Bollana-South | Gampaha | 22 November 2002 | At 5th miles stone of Kandana-Ganemulla road | |
| Bothale Patthini Devalaya | | | Bothale Ihalagama | Mirigama | 22 November 2002 | | |
| Bothale Walawwa | | Bothale Pahalagama | | Mirigama | 3 September 1999 | Old Walawwa | |
| Dadagamuwa Raja Maha Vihara | | Dadagamuwa | | Attanagalla | 8 July 2005 | Ancient Vatadageya and image house | |
| Dharmalankara Pirivena | | Pethiyagoda | Pilapitiya | Kelaniya | 23 February 2007 | Ancient image house with paintings and sculpture | |
| Dhathukanda Sri Jinendarama Purana Raja Maha Vihara | | Kalalpitiya | No. 343, Kalalpitiya | Attanagalla | 12 June 2015 | Place with ruins of buildings, place with the evidences of a settlement of pre historic era and the plight of steps carved on natural rock | |
| Ethabendalena | | Alawala | | Attanagalla | 23 February 2007 | Cave with drip - ledges known as Ethabendalena and the cave with drip - ledges situated in Eastern bank of the mountain known a Mahakanda | |
| Gal Edanda Raja Maha Vihara | | | Pahalakaragahamuna | Mahara | 23 February 2007 | Rock with column base | |
| Galgana Pilimakella Archaeological ruins | | | 32 Galgana | Mirigama | 6 June 2008 | The drip ledged rock caves and the Buddha statue | |
| Gallinda watta Ambalama | | Ambagaspitiya | Pahalatutthiripitiya | Mahara | 22 November 2002 | At Gallindawatta land premisses | |
| Ganegoda watta Archaeological Ruins | | Samanabedda | No. 416A | Dompe | 23 February 2007 | Drip-ledge, cave complex with inscriptions, rock inscriptions, pond staircase carved out in the rock to the North of the cave complex found in the land | |
| Ganeuda Raja Maha Vihara | | Samanabedda | No. 416 A Samanabedda | Dompe | 6 July 2007 | Cave with dripledges, pond, steps and the inscriptions | |
| Henarathgoda Railway Station | | Gampaha town | 223 Medagama I | Gampaha | 13 February 2009 | The Building that had accommodate the old Henerathgoda Railway Station in the Gampaha Town | |
| Heiyanthuduwa Purana Vihara | | Heiyanthuduwa | Heiyanthuduwa-West | Biyagama | 23 February 2007 | Ancient devala and image house with paintings belonging to the Kandyan period | |
| Jayasundararama Vihara | | Dematadenikanda | | Attanagalla | 22 November 2002 | Ancient image house and Preaching hall | |
| Kandawala Water-level-measurement pillar | | | Kadirana | Katana | 6 February 2009 | | |
| Kandumulla rock caves | | Ambagaspitiya | | Attanagalla | 8 July 2005 | 2 Drip ledged caves and 7 of others | |
| Kekirihena cave | | Yongammulla | | Mahara | 22 November 2002 | The drip ledged cave at Kekirihena land premisses | |
| Kelaniya Raja Maha Vihara | | Kelaniya | No. 264 Kelaniya | Kelaniya | 23 February 2007 | The Ancient image house Dagoba, rectangular two story building known as Simamalakaya, ancient preaching hall ancient Vibhishana devalaya and inscriptions | |
| Keragala Purana Vihara | | Keragala | | Dompe | 14 August 1964 | | |
| Kiritarama Vihara | | Mottunna | | Attanagalla | 23 February 1967 | Ancient Tampita Vihara | |
| Kitulgolla cave | | Pilikuththuwa | | Mahara | 22 November 2002 | The drip ledged cave at Kitulgolla land premisses | |
| Koskandawala ancient caves | | Koskandawala | | Attanagalla | 22 November 2002 | At Galabodawatta land premisses | |
| Koskandawala Raja Maha Vihara | | Koskandawala | | Attanagalla | 1 November 1996 | Ancient Image house | |
| Koskandawala Raja Maha Vihara | | | No. 308, Koskandawala | Attanagalla | 15 April 2016 | Ancient Dharmasala | |
| Kossinna Raja Maha Vihara | | Kossinna | | Gampaha | 22 November 2002 | The image house, Devalaya and Stupa of Vihara premisses | |
| Kota Veherawatta Stupa | | | 363-A Palkumbura | Attanagalla | 6 June 2008 | The ancient Stupa mound in the site | |
| Kshestrarama Purana Vihara | | Hapuwana | 87, Hapuwalana | Divulapitiya | 12 June 2015 | Tempita shrine and Phoya Seemawa | |
| Lenagampala Purana Viharaa | | | Lenagampala | Dompe | 15 April 2016 | The Drip ledged cave temple | |
| Lindara Raja Maha Vihara | | | Lindara | Mirigama | 22 November 2002 | 5 Drip ledged caves | |
| Madabavita Raja Maha Vihara (Kande Vihara) | | Nalla | 21 B, Madabavita | Mirigama | 23 February 2007 | Inscriptions, dripledges, cave temple with paintings of the Kandyan period | |
| Makura Dharmarathanarama Vihara | | Makura | Makura | Mirigama | 22 November 2002 | Ancient image house | |
| Maligatenna Raja Maha Vihara | | | No. 297-Malwathuhiripitiya | Mahara | 6 June 2008 | The rock caves in the lower courtyard and the pathway wall in the upper courtyard and flight of steps known as Degaldoruwa | |
| Maimbula Gallen Vihara | | Ranpokunagama | No. 350, Maimbula | Attanagalla | 15 April 2016 | Cave temple with ancient firescoeses and sculptures within the premises | |
| Malwana Fort | | Narangaskotuwa | No. 413 Malwana | Dompe | 24 July 2009 | | |
| Meddegama Raja Maha Vihara | | Meddegama | | Dompe | 25 September 1959 | Ancient Bodhi tree | |
| Midigahalanda cave | | Yongammulla | | Mahara | 22 November 2002 | The drip ledged cave at Midigahalanda land premisses | |
| Miriswatta Gallen Vihara | | Mangalatiriya | | Attanagalla | 22 November 2002 | | |
| Negombo fort | | | No. 156A, Uturmunnakkaraya | Negombo | 22 July 2011 | The approach Gate and the Ramparts of the Dutch Fort situated in the Negombo Court approach road | |
| Panasavanarama Vihara | | Kospillewa | Pedipola | Minuwangoda | 22 November 2002 | Ancient preaching hall | |
| Parewigala drip ledged cave | | Koskandawela | No. 308A, koskandawela | Attanagalla | 15 April 2016 | Ancient Dharmasala | |
| Pilikuththuwa Raja Maha Vihara | | Pilikuththuwa | | Mahara | 1 November 1996 | Ancient Image house | |
| Pilikuththuwa Raja Maha Vihara | | Pilikuththuwa | | Mahara | 22 November 2002 | Drip Ledged caves, Ancient Awasage, Ancient wooden bridge, Ancient pond, Dagoba with Ledged Cave and Stone inscription | |
| Pilikuththuwa Raja Maha Vihara | | | | Mahara | 15 April 2016 | The Dharmasala in Vihara premises | |
| Pothgul Vihara, Atupothdeniya | | Atupothdeniya | | Mirigama | 22 November 2002 | Ancient Tampita Vihara | |
| Pothgul Vihara, Loluwagoda | | Loluwagoda | | Mirigama | 1 November 1996 | Ancient Image house | |
| Saddharamathilakarama Vihara | | Metikotamulla | | Minuwangoda | 22 November 2002 | Ancient Tampita Vihara | |
| Sapugaskanda Raja Maha Vihara | | Sapugaskanda | | Kelaniya | 1 November 1996 | Ancient Image house | |
| Shylakantharama Purana Vihara | | Maladeniya | No. 4 A, Maladeniya | Mirigama | 30 December 2011 | All the Caves with Inscription and dripledged cave temple Flight of steps, ancient Stupa Mound, rock inscription | |
| Siriwardhanarama Vihara | | Kottegoda | Pahala Yagoda | Gampaha | 22 November 2002 | The image house | |
| Sri Bodhirukkharama Purana Vihara | | Eluwapitiya | | Attanagalla | 31 August 1984 | Ancient image house and Bodhi tree | |
| Sri Gotabhaya Raja Maha Vihara | | Bothale Ihalagama | | Mirigama | 1 July 1966 | Ancient Bodhi tree and other monuments | |
| Sri Jinendrarama Vihara, Raddalgoda | | Raddalgoda | | Mirigama | 4 July 1975 | Ancient Tampita Vihara | |
| Sri Jinendrarama Vihara, Warapalana | | Warapalana | Udututthiripitiya | Mahara | 22 November 2002 | Tampita Vihara (Vihara on pillars) | |
| Sri Prabodharama Purana Vihara | | | Girikuluwa | Mirigama | 6 July 2007 | Ancient image house | |
| Sri Saddharmagupta Piriven Vihara | | Dombawala | | Minuwangoda | | The library building, preaching hall | |
| Sri Saddharmarama Vihara | | Mahalloluwa | Millate | Dompe | 8 July 2005 | Ancient Tampita Vihara | |
| Sri Sudarshanarama Vihara, Mahalloluwa | | Mahalloluwa | Kirindiwela | Dompe | 22 November 2002 | At Galabodawatta land premisses | |
| Sri Sudarshanarama Vihara, Mirigama | | | Uthuwambogahawatta | Mirigama | 22 November 2002 | Ancient pond | |
| Sri Sudharmarama Vihara, Thelangapatha | | | 24 Thelangapatha | Wattala | 23 February 2007 | Ancient bana Preaching hall | |
| Sri Sugatharama Purana Vihara | | | 216 B, Tibbotugoda | Gampaha | 22 November 2002 | The image house | |
| Sri Sumangalarama Purana vihara | | Delgawatta | No. 292 - C Anuragoda | Dompe | 23 January 2009 | The Tempita Vihara and Buddhist Bhikkus Disciplinary Hall | |
| Sri Vijayasundararama Vihara | | | No. 256 A, Hunupitiya, East | Kelaniya | 23 February 2007 | Ancient image house | |
| St. Mary's Church, Pilapitiya | | Pilapitiya | Pilapitiya | Kelaniya | 23 February 2007 | | |
| Saint Stephen's Church, Negombo | | | | Negombo | 30 December 2011 | The Christian Church in the Courts Road, Negombo | |
| Sudarshanarama Vihara, Kiribathgoda | | | No. 267 A, Kiribathgoda | Kelaniya | 23 February 2007 | Ancient image house with ancient paintings | |
| Sugathanandanarama Purana Vihara | | Pahala Yagoda | Pahala Yagoda | Gampaha | 22 November 2002 | The image house | |
| Sun Moon carved rock | | | Galahitiyawa-North | Gampaha | 22 November 2002 | | |
| Thalagama Raja Maha Vihara | | | Thalagama-East | Mirigama | 22 November 2002 | Caves and inscriptions in Vihara premisses | |
| The ancient Magazine in Negombo Courts Road | | | No. 156A, Uturmunnakkaraya | Negombo | 22 July 2011 | | |
| The building with Assessment No. 329 | | | No. 261, Vedamulla | Kelaniya | 23 February 2007 | Building situated in the premises bearing Assessment No. 329 in Waragoda road where it is considered to have started the Waragodawadaya (debate) | |
| The drip ledged rock cave, access steps | | Uduthungiripitiya | No. 319-A-Pilankada | Attanagalla | 6 June 2008 | | |
| The Old Oak Tree | | | No. 156A, Uturmunnakkaraya | Negombo | 22 July 2011 | At the new court complex premises, Circular Road | |
| Thotewatta Patthini Devalaya | | Madurupitiya | | Mirigama | 22 November 2002 | Ancient Tampita Vihara | |
| Uruwala Valagamba Raja Maha Vihara | | | Bothpitiya-North | Mahara | 8 July 2005 | Drip ledged caves, Ancient Bodhi tree and Poya house | |
| Uththararama Purana Vihara, Udammita | | Udammita | Udammita (GND No. 197) | Ja-Ela | 17 May 2013 | The ancient image house | |
| Uththararama Purana Vihara, Udugampola | | Udugampola | Pahala Udugampola-North | Minuwangoda | 8 July 2005 | Pathaha Pokuna and moat | |
| Vidyalankara Pirivena | | Peliyagoda | | Kelaniya | 18 June 1999 | | |
| Viharagala Meegalla drip ledged cave | | Meegalla | Meewitigammana | Dompe | 15 April 2016 | The Drip ledged cave temple | |
| Viharakanda (kahatagahalanda) cave | | Pilikuththuwa | | Mahara | 22 November 2002 | The drip ledged cave, inscription and other ruins at Viharakanda land premisses | |
| Viharakandawatta cave | | Pilikuththuwa | | Mahara | 22 November 2002 | The drip ledged cave with inscription at Viharakandawatta land premisses | |
| Vivekarama Vihara | | Hewaniwala | Pahalatutthiripitiya | Mahara | 22 November 2002 | Ancient image house | |
| Warana Raja Maha Vihara | | Thihariya | | Gampaha | 1 November 1996 | Ancient Image house | |
| Weherahinna Archaeological ruins | | Thorapitiya | No. 336/A, Kandalandaa | Mirigama | 9 September 2011 | The Cave Covering bearing Pre Historic evidence and flight of steps, Metal quarry site, Chaithya mound in the land called Weherahinna | |
| Welipillewa Purana Vihara | | Welipillewa | | Mahara | 22 November 2002 | Ancient image house | |
| Yaka Bendi Ella | | Nalla | 3 A, Nalla | Mirigama | 23 February 2007 | Ancient Gal Amuna and Remaining Portions of Sluice gate known as Yaka Bendi Ella constructed across Nalla village | |
| Yatawatta Purana Vihara (Vidyaravinda Maha Pirivena, Pahalagama) | | Pahalagama | Pahalagama | Gampaha | 15 April 2016 | The Tampita Vihara (The Vihara on pillars) | |
| Yayagala Purana Vihara | | | Pahalagama-Vevaldeniya | Mirigama | 6 June 2008 | The Buddha shrine | |
