= List of towns in Sri Lanka =

The following is a list of settlements in Sri Lanka with a population between 5,000 and 50,000.

== Towns ==
Town	Image	DS Division	District	Province	Population		Area		Density (/km^{2})	Co- ordinates
Town	Image	DS Division	District	Province	Conurbation (2012 est)	Municipality (2012 census)	km²	mi²	Density (/km^{2})	Co- ordinates
Vaddukoddai வட்டுக்கோட்டை		Valikamam West	Jaffna	Northern	4,407	4,129				
Badulla බදුල්ල பதுளை		Badulla	Badulla	Uva	47,587	42,237	10	4	4,224	6°59′05″N 81°03′23″E
Matara මාතර மாத்தறை		Matara	Matara	Southern	47,420	74,193	13	5	5,707	5°57′00″N 80°33′00″E
Puttalam පුත්තලම புத்தளம்		Puttalam	Puttalam	North Western	45,401	45,511				8°02′03″N 79°50′07″E
Chavakachcheri චාවකච්චේරිය சாவகச்சேரி		Thenmarachchi	Jaffna	Northern	41,407	16,129				9°39′00″N 80°09′00″E
Kattankudy කාත්තන්කුඩි காத்தான்குடி		Kattankudy	Batticaloa	Eastern	40,883	40,356				7°41′39″N 81°44′12″E
Matale මාතලේ மாத்தளை		Matale	Matale	Central	40,859	36,462	9	3	4,051	7°28′00″N 80°37′00″E
Dambulla දඹුල්ල		Dambulla	Matale	Central	72,306	23,814	54	21	441	7°51′28″N 80°39′09″E
Kalutara කළුතර களுத்துறை		Kalutara	Kalutara	Western	39,615	32,417				6°35′13″N 79°57′37″E
Mannar මන්නාරම மன்னார்		Mannar	Mannar	Northern	35,817	24,417				8°58′00″N 79°53′00″E
Panadura පානදුර பாணந்துறை		Panadura	Kalutara	Western	35,717	30,069				6°42′48″N 79°54′15″E
Beruwala බේරුවල பேருவளை		Beruwala	Kalutara	Western	35,312	37,793				6°28′00″N 79°59′00″E
Ja-Ela ජා-ඇල ஜா-எல		Ja-Ela	Gampaha	Western	32,386	31,232				7°05′04″N 79°53′41″E
Point Pedro පේදුරුතුඩුව பருத்தித்துறை		Vadamarachchi North	Jaffna	Northern	31,351	12,334				9°49′00″N 80°14′00″E
Kelaniya කැලණිය களனி		Kelaniya	Gampaha	Western	31,307					6°57′00″N 79°54′00″E
Peliyagoda පෑලියගොඩ பேலியகொடை		Kelaniya	Gampaha	Western	31,307	27,736				6°57′00″N 79°54′00″E
Kurunegala කුරුණෑගල குருனகல்		Kurunegala	Kurunegala	North Western	30,314	24,833	11	4	2,258	7°29′00″N 80°22′00″E
Wattala වත්තල வத்தளை		Wattala	Gampaha	Western	30,229	28,031				6°59′00″N 79°53′00″E
Gampola ගම්පොල கம்பளை			Kandy	Central	27,659	37,871				7°59′53″N 80°34′36″E
Nuwara Eliya නුවරඑළිය நுவரேலியா		Nuwara Eliya	Nuwara Eliya	Central	27,326	23,804	12	5	1,984	6°58′00″N 80°46′00″E
Valvettithurai වෙල්වෙටිතුරේ வல்வெட்டித்துறை		Vadamarachchi North	Jaffna	Northern	27,210	8,283				9°49′00″N 80°10′00″E
Chilaw හලාවත சிலாபம்		Chilaw	Puttalam	North Western	26,714	21,441				7°35′00″N 79°48′00″E
Eravur එරාවුර් ஏறாவூர்		Eravur Town	Batticaloa	Eastern	25,582	24,643				7°46′00″N 81°36′00″E
Avissawella අවිස්සාවේල්ල அவிசாவலை		Hanwella	Colombo	Western	25,322					6°57′11″N 80°13′06″E
Weligama වැලිගම வெலிகமை		Weligama	Matara	Southern	24,159	22,377				5°58′24″N 80°25′21″E
Ambalangoda අම්බලන්ගොඩ அம்பலாங்கொட		Ambalangoda	Galle	Southern	21,573	19,990				6°13′30″N 80°03′24″E
Ampara අම්පාර அம்பாறை		Ampara	Ampara	Eastern	20,309	22,511				7°17′00″N 81°40′00″E
Kegalle කෑගල්ල கேகாலை		Kegalle	Kegalle	Sabaragamuwa	17,962	15,993				7°15′00″N 80°21′00″E
Hatton හැටන් ஹற்றன்		Ambagamuwa	Nuwara Eliya	Central	16,237	14,585				6°31′57″N 80°21′19″E
Nawalapitiya නාවලපිටිය நாவலபிட்டி		Pasbage Korale	Kandy	Central	15,415	13,338				7°03′00″N 80°32′00″E
Balangoda බලන්ගොඩ பலங்கொடா		Balangoda	Ratnapura	Sabaragamuwa	13,589	16,510				6°39′00″N 80°41′00″E
Hambantota හම්බන්තොට அம்பாந்தோட்டை		Hambantota	Hambantota	Southern	12,071	23,236	83	32	280	6°07′28″N 81°07′21″E
Tangalle තංගල්ල தங்கல்ல		Tangalle	Hambantota	Southern	11,258	8,473				6°01′00″N 80°47′00″E
Monaragala මොණරාගල மொனராகல		Moneragala	Monaragala	Uva	10,853					6°52′00″N 81°21′00″E
Gampaha ගම්පහ கம்பகா		Gampaha	Gampaha	Western	9,889	62,335	38	15	1,640	7°05′30″N 79°59′39″E
Horana හොරණ ஹொரண		Horana	Kalutara	Western	9,774	9,550				6°43′00″N 80°03′00″E
Wattegama වත්තේගම வத்தேகமை		Pathadumbara	Kandy	Uva	8,770					7°21′01″N 80°40′57″E
Minuwangoda මිණුවන්ගොඩ மினுவன்கொட		Minuwangoda	Gampaha	Western	8,016	7,523				7°10′24″N 79°57′43″E
Bandarawela බණ්ඩාරවෙල பண்டாரவளை		Bandarawela	Badulla	Uva	7,878	24,168	27	10	895	6°50′00″N 80°59′00″E
Kuliyapitiya කුලියාපිටිය குளியாப்பிட்டிய			Kurunegala	North Western	6,850	5,509				7°28′14″N 80°02′44″E
Haputale හපුතලේ அப்புத்தளை		Haputale	Badulla	Uva	5,559	5,288				6°46′04″N 80°57′31″E
