= Mabodale =

Mabodala මාබෝදල மபோடலே
- Suburb
- Location of Mabodala in Sri Lanka
- Coordinates: 7°12′N 80°01′E
- Country: Sri Lanka
- Province: Western Province
- District: Gampaha
- DS Division: Minuwangoda

Population (2012)
  - Total: 4,832
- Time zone: UTC+5:30 (Sri Lanka Standard Time)

Mabodala (Sinhala: මාබෝදල, Tamil: மபோடலே) is a village in Gampaha District of Sri Lanka. It is situated approximately 12 km (7.5 mi) from the Gampaha, 15 km (9.3 mi) from the Negombo and also near suburban areas of Divulapitiya, Minuwangoda and Veyangoda. Mabodala is approximately 20 km^{2} (7.7 sq mi) in extent and is divided into four village officer divisions (Mabodala East, Mabodala North, Mabodala South and Mabodala West) whose combined population was 4,832 at the 2012 census.

. Paddy and betel cultivation had been the main source of income for many families for decades.

== Climate ==
Mabodale belongs to the wet zone of Sri Lanka where ample amount of rain is received throughout the year. The average temperature is 30 degrees Celsius during day time and high humidity is sometimes experienced.

== Places of interest ==
The main physical landmark in Mabodale is its water reservoir, Mabodale Weva. The catchment area is mainly large private lands with coconut cultivation.

Mabodale has four main Buddhist temples.

== Transportation ==
Mabodale is accessible from surrounding suburban areas by road. The village is served by two buses running between Divulapitiya and Veyangoda regularly. Mabodale is connected to the main railway network via Veyangoda, where all of the express trains stop. Access to Colombo, which is 40 km (25 mi) away, can be made by the buses running along the bus route No. 05 operating from Kurunegala to Colombo via Minuwangoda.

== Schools ==
The village has one government school.

== See also ==
- Dewalapola
