= Banduragoda Grama Niladhari Division =

Banduragoda
- Grama Niladhari Division
- Interactive map of Banduragoda
- Coordinates: 7.229045°N 80.058998°E
- Country: Sri Lanka
- Province: Western Province
- District: Gampaha District
- Divisional Secretariat: Mirigama Divisional Secretariat
- Electoral District: Gampaha Electoral District
- Polling Division: Mirigama Polling Division

Area
  - Total: 1.64 km^{2} (0.63 sq mi)
- Elevation: 36 m (118 ft)

Population (2012)
  - Total: 910
  - Density: 555/km^{2} (1,440/sq mi)
- ISO 3166 code: LK-1212285

Banduragoda

Banduragoda Grama Niladhari Division is a Grama Niladhari Division of the Mirigama Divisional Secretariat of Gampaha District of Western Province, Sri Lanka. It has Grama Niladhari Division Code 35.

Banduragoda is a surrounded by the Ihala Madithiyawala, Rassapana, Ullalapola East, Wattemulla, Gaspe, Gaspe Pahalagama, Keppitiwalana, Hangawatta and Gaspe Pahalagama Grama Niladhari Divisions.

== Demographics ==
=== Ethnicity ===
The Banduragoda Grama Niladhari Division has a Sinhalese majority (98.2%). In comparison, the Mirigama Divisional Secretariat (which contains the Banduragoda Grama Niladhari Division) has a Sinhalese majority (94.7%)

Ethnicity in Banduragoda
1. Sinhalese (98.2%)
2. Sri Lankan Tamil (1.60%)
3. Other (0.10%)

=== Religion ===
The Banduragoda Grama Niladhari Division has a Buddhist majority (94.4%). In comparison, the Mirigama Divisional Secretariat (which contains the Banduragoda Grama Niladhari Division) has a Buddhist majority (93.5%)

Religion in Banduragoda
1. Buddhist (94.4%)
2. Roman Catholic (2.20%)
3. Other Christian (1.80%)
4. Hindu (1.50%)
5. Other (0.10%)
