= Lalith Wijerathna =

Sri Lankan politician and third leader of JVP (1958–1990)

- ලලිත් විජේරත්න
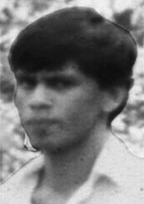

3rd Leader of Janatha Vimukthi Peramuna
- In office 27 December 1989 – 1 January 1990
- Preceded by: Saman Piyasiri Fernando
- Succeeded by: Somawansa Amarasinghe

Personal details
- Born: Vijalath Pathirannehelage Lalith Wijeratne; 1 January 1958 Divulapitiya, Sri Lanka
- Died: 4 January 1990 (aged 32) Mattegoda, Sri Lanka
- Party: Janatha Vimukthi Peramuna
- Education: Hunumulla Central College
- Alma mater: University of Peradeniya
- Occupation: Politician

Vijalath Pathirannehelage Lalith Wijeratne (1 January 1958 – 4 January 1990: Sinhala: ලලිත් විජේරත්න), popularly known as Lalith Wijerathna, was a Sri Lankan politician and militant leader. He was a member of the JVP party in the period 1983-1990. He was known to be appointed as the third leader of the JVP after Rohana Wijeweera and Saman Piyasiri Fernando.

== Personal life ==
Wijeratne was born on 1 January 1958 in Barawawila, Divulapitiya, Sri Lanka as the third child in the family. His father Vijalath Pathirannahelage Piyasena was born on 25 December 1924. His mother Kaluarachchige Rosalyn Nona was born on 18 December 1928 in Kehelle. His father worked as a farmer his mother made matchsticks for the Maltune Match Factory at the Thambakar Trade Center in Divulapitiya and sold them to the factory. Lalith had one elder sister Indrani (born 1953), one elder brother Nimal (born 1956), one younger brother, Ranjith (born 3 April 1960) and one younger sister Vasantha (born 1961).

He had his primary Education from Hapugahagama Junior College. From grade 6 onwards, he studied at the Hunumulla Central College, Divulapitiya (currently known as Kannangara Central College) until the GCE Advanced level examination and entered the Faculty of Science, University of Peradeniya on October 27, 1980. However, he did not complete his studies at the university due to his heavy engagement in politics. His studentship was revoked after a decision from the Udulagama Commission abolished his studentship forever which was set up to probe student agitations at the University of Peradeniya in 1983. A deadly hunger strike was launched in 1983 against it and Professor Dias was later taken hostage. Finally the university was closed. The university was reopened with 117 students suspended including Wijerathna. At the same time, the legal student councils in Sri Lankan universities were banned by the government and the University Police was established at the Peradeniya University premises.

Younger brother Ranjith Wijerathna worked as a Line Operator at the Vivian Mills Garment Factory in Kapuwatta. He was killed in Colombo on November 21, 1989 after being arrested by the police. At the time of Ranjith's assassination, his wife Sriyani was a mother of two.

Lalith's girlfriend was Mangala Herath. It is said that she first stayed in Girandurukotte, then in Ratnapura and then in Maharagama and later moved to Padukka. She has passed the City & Guilds exam and obtained a post of Engineering Assistant in the Japanese Contracting Company at Henanigala Mahaweli Camp.

== Political career ==
He joined the JVP in 1978 after school through his mother's brother Rassapanage Jayasinghe, an English teacher at Hunumulla Maha Vidyalaya in Kehelella, Divulapitiya. His son Poojitha Jayasinghe was also arrested during the Second insurgency and the house was set on fire by paramilitary forces on August 2, 1988. The JVP held classes for Lalith under the supervision of Pinnakele Watte Artigala. Lalith Wijerathna started his political career as a student activist of Socialist Student Union (SSU), the student wing of the JVP. After the expulsion from the university he became a full-time JVP member. Wijeratne was also known as Kapila, Jayantha, Aravinda and Siridasa.

In 1982, when the JVP's leader Rohana Wijeweera contested the presidential election, Wijerathna supported his campaign. Even though he was a skillful organizer and a charismatic leader, Wijeratha was little known outside the party. Lalith was elected to the Political Bureau in 1988 from the National Committee of the JVP Socialist Students Union through the Central Committee. Lalith, who was the General Secretary of the Socialist Students' Union, was arrested by the Divulapitiya Police in early 1983 and the Meetiyagoda Police on May 31, 1987. Lalith last came home in August 1987 in a 14 Sri Lancer wagon. He also used a green CM125 motorcycle.

In mid 1989, after the killing of Sumith Athukorala, a prominent politbureau member of the JVP, Wijerathna was believed to be promoted to the political bureau to fill up the vacant position. During second JVP insurrection. Wijeratne was the junior among the 13 members of the Politburo who led the JVP's Second Rebellion. He was the political and military leader of the Polonnaruwa, Anuradhapura and Trincomalee districts in the North Central region during the Second JVP insurrection. After the assassination of Saman Piyasiri on December 29, 1989, Wijeratne became the third leader of the JVP on December 30, 1989.

== Capture and Murder ==
In November 1989, after Rohana Wijeweera's alleged assassination, the remaining leaders including Saman Piyasiri Fernando, Lalilth Wijerathna, Upali Jayaweera, Ranjitham Gunaratnam, Gamini Wijegunasekara and Shantha Bandara tried to regroup. This attempt was made under the leadership of Saman Piyasisri Fernando. However, the government forces managed to capture Saman Piyasisri and subsequently killed him on 27 December 1989. After the capture of Saman Piyasiri, the leadership of the JVP was transferred to Lalith Wijerathna. He served as the leader of the JVP for just six days.

Meanwhile Gunaratne, the JVP Zonal Armed Leader, was arrested by the security forces at the Ratnapura bus stand on December 29, 1989 at 6 pm, and was taken home and later detained at the Kuruwita Army Camp belonging to the Gemunu Service Brigade. On the night of December 29, 1989, security forces raided Gunaratne's Panukarapitiya home and set up an 'ambush trap' to apprehend insurgents entering the house. Under this, 7 soldiers were hiding in the house and were ready to arrest those who came to the house. Wijeratne arrived at this house at 11 am on December 31, 1989 to meet Member of the Political Bureau Shantha Bandara. Later he was captured by the ambushed special police team. He was later taken to the Kuruwita Army camp where he confessed that he was Lalith Wijeratne after being tortured. Among those who questioned Wijeratne at the Kuruwita Army Camp on the afternoon of December 31, 1989 was Colonel Chulabhaya Lakshman Wijeyeratne, then Chief Commander of the Uva Province.

At 5 am on January 1, 1990, Ops Combine officers brought Wijeratne in a Defender vehicle with Ratnapura District Armed Secretary Percy Weerasinghe alias Ilukkumbura alias Ilukkumbura alias Ravi and Ratnapura District Zonal Leader Gunaratne at the University of Colombo 7 Came. They were brought before the Commanding Officer of the Rapid Deployment Force, Colonel Janaka Perera. On his 32nd birthday, Gunaratne has his breakfast with other prisoners prepared for the army officers on the New Year table. All three, including Wijeratne, were later brought to the Mattegoda Army Camp at 11 am and Wijeratne was separated and tortured. Two days later, on the morning of January 3, 1990, Lalith was tortured into not being able to eat food. Finally he was killed at the Mattegoda Army Camp on January 4, 1990, and the body was cremated at the Boralesgamuwa Cemetery along with two other rebels.

== Bibliography ==
- Rohan Gunarathna (1990), Sri Lanka, a lost revolution, Institute of fundamental studies ISBN 955-26-0004-9
- C. A. Chandraprema (1991) Sri Lanka, The Years of Terror- The JVP insurrection 1987-1989, Lake House Bookshop, ISBN 955-9029-03-7
- S. Puvimanasinghe (2004), An Exceptional Collapse of the Rule of Law, Told through stories by families of the disappeared in Sri Lanka, Asian Human Rights Commission, ISBN 962-8161-06-7

Party political offices
Preceded by Saman Piyasiri Fernando	Leader of Janatha Vimukthi Peramuna; 27 December 1989 – 1 January 1990	Succeeded by Somawansa Amarasinghe
