= Warana Raja Maha Vihara =

Sri Lanka Buddhist temple

- වාරණ රජ මහා විහාරය
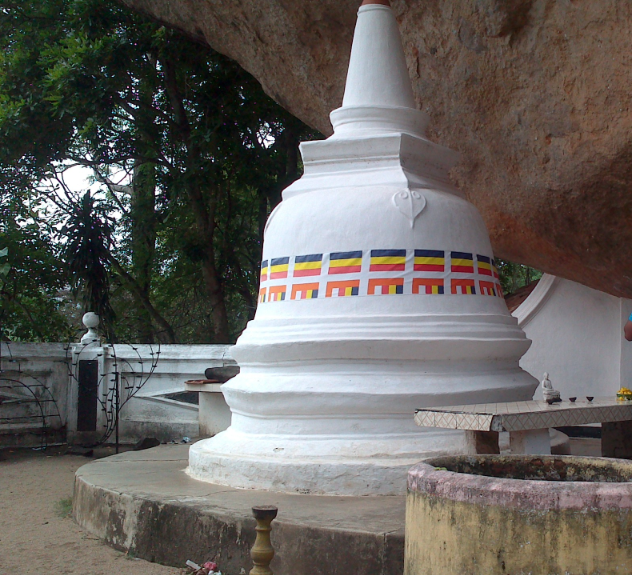
- Ancient Stupa at middle ground

Religion
- Affiliation: Buddhism
- District: Gampaha
- Province: Western Province

Location
- Location: Warana, Thihariya, Sri Lanka
- Interactive map of Warana Raja Maha Vihara
- Coordinates: 07°06′15.3″N 80°04′28.9″E

Architecture
- Type: Buddhist Temple
- Style: Cave temple
- Founder: King Devanampiyathissa (307–267 BC)

Warana Raja Maha Vihara (Sinhalaː වාරණ රජ මහා විහාරය) is an ancient Buddhist temple situated in Thihariya, Gampaha District, Sri Lanka. The temple is located approximately 5 km (3.1 mi) away from the Colombo - Kandy highway. Currently this temple has been recognized as an archaeological protected site in Gampaha District by Archaeological department.

== History ==
Warana Raja Maha Vihara is believed to have been built during the reign of King Devanampiyathissa (307–267 BC) and according to the temple chronicles preserved at the Vihara, later renovations have been undertaken by King Valagamba (103 BCE and c.89–77 BCE), Nissanka Malla (1187–1196), Kirti Sri Rajasinha (1747–1782) and Parakramabahu VI.

According to the Dr. Senarath Paranavithana's book Inscriptions of Ceylon, Part I, a Brahmin inscription, found in the vihara premises, has been interpreted as follows:.

Bata-Majhimasa batika bata-Tisadatasa dane. (In English: "The gift of Lord Tissadatta, brother of Lord Magjihima)

Uruwala, Maligatenna, Pilikuththuwa, Miriswatta and Koskandawala cave temples, situated in the vicinity of the Warana temple are said to have been formed from one major temple complex in the early Anuradhapura period.

== The temple ==
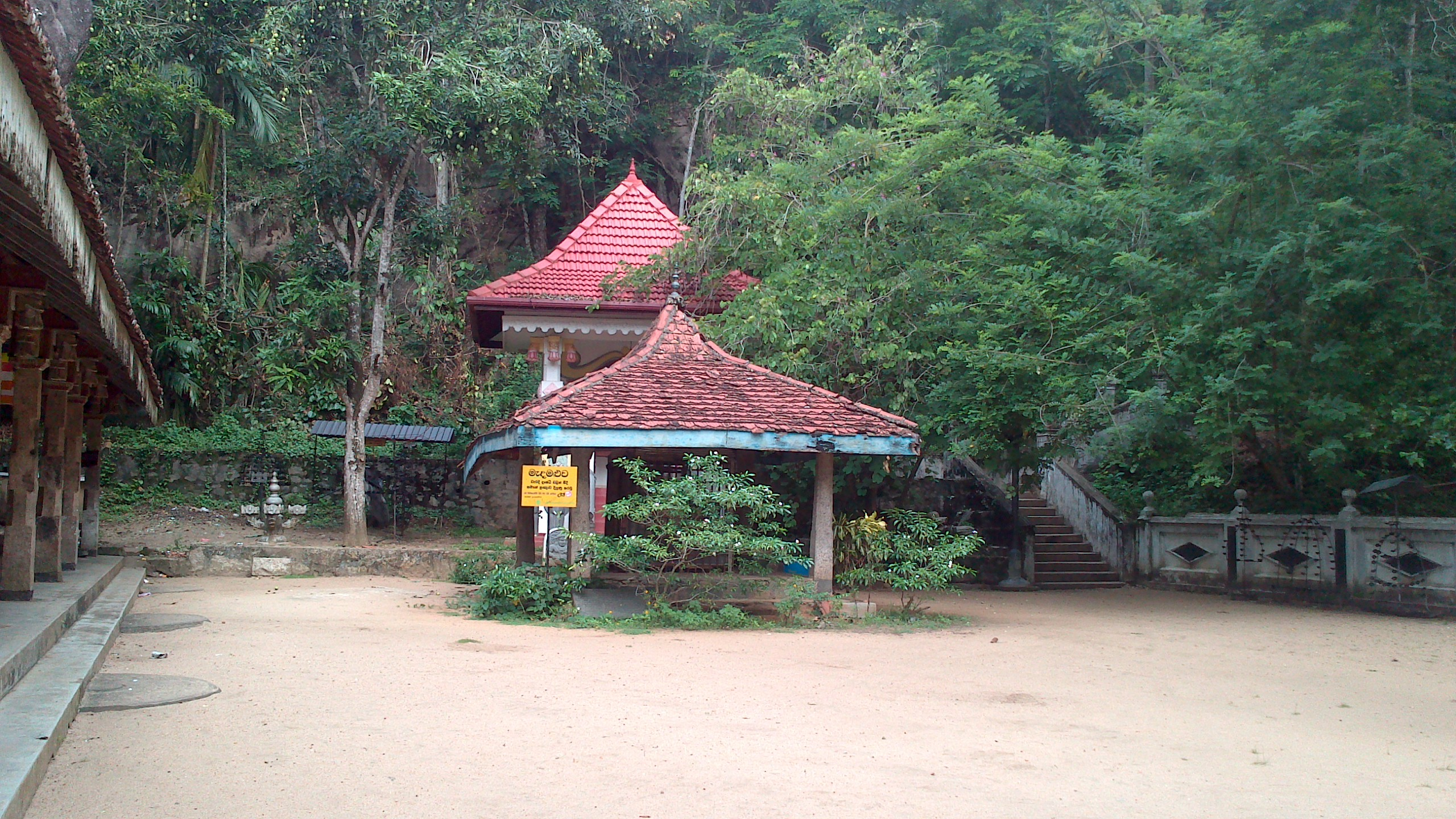
A scene of the temple

The temple is mainly consist of three levels as Pahala maluwa, Meda maluwa and Ihala maluwa. On the first level, the Sangawasaya and the Dharma Hall are located and on the middle level, the drip-led cave temple with its ancient Stupa can be seen. It is said that the stupa is around 800 years old. Inside the cave temple, many of Buddha statues and paintings are found. The canopy of the cave has been decorated with lotus flowers and with various other flower designs. In the top level, another Stupa and Cave temple can be seen.

== See also ==
- List of Archaeological Protected Monuments in Gampaha District
