= Korase =

Village in Western Province, Sri Lanka (Dasiya Pattu, Aluthkuru Korale)

Korase කොරසේ கொரசே
- Village
- Location in Sri Lanka
- Coordinates: 7°10′24″N 79°57′43″E
- Country: Sri Lanka
- Province: Western Province
- District: Gampaha District
- Minuwangoda Divisional Secretariat: Dewalapola Grama Niladhari Division
- Time zone: UTC+5.30 (SLST)
- Postal code: 11102
- Area code: 011

Korase is a small village in Minuwangoda Divisional Secretariat of Sri Lanka.
