= Nariyamulla Grama Niladhari Division =

Nariyamulla
- Grama Niladhari Division
- Interactive map of Nariyamulla
- Coordinates: 7.250840°N 80.099890°E
- Country: Sri Lanka
- Province: Western Province
- District: Gampaha District
- Divisional Secretariat: Divulapitiya Divisional Secretariat
- Electoral District: Gampaha Electoral District
- Polling Division: Divulapitiya Polling Division

Area
  - Total: 1.31 km^{2} (0.51 sq mi)
- Elevation: 86 m (282 ft)

Population (2012)
  - Total: 557
  - Density: 425/km^{2} (1,100/sq mi)
- ISO 3166 code: LK-1209410

Nariyamulla

Nariyamulla Grama Niladhari Division is a Grama Niladhari Division of the Divulapitiya Divisional Secretariat of Gampaha District of Western Province, Sri Lanka. It has Grama Niladhari Division Code 42A.

Nariyamulla is a surrounded by the Halpe, Gurullagama, Kithulwala Ihala, Kaluaggala Pahalagama, Kaluaggala and Kuleegedara Grama Niladhari Divisions.

== Demographics ==
=== Ethnicity ===
The Nariyamulla Grama Niladhari Division has a Sinhalese majority (100.0%). In comparison, the Divulapitiya Divisional Secretariat (which contains the Nariyamulla Grama Niladhari Division) has a Sinhalese majority (99.0%)

Ethnicity in Nariyamulla
1. Sinhalese (100.0%)
2. Other (0.00%)

=== Religion ===
The Nariyamulla Grama Niladhari Division has a Buddhist majority (99.6%). In comparison, the Divulapitiya Divisional Secretariat (which contains the Nariyamulla Grama Niladhari Division) has a Buddhist majority (85.1%) and a significant Roman Catholic population (13.4%)

Religion in Nariyamulla
1. Buddhist (99.6%)
2. Other (0.40%)
