= Ruwanpura (Attanagalla) Grama Niladhari Division =

Ruwanpura
- Grama Niladhari Division
- Interactive map of Ruwanpura
- Coordinates: 7.073926°N 80.110577°E
- Country: Sri Lanka
- Province: Western Province
- District: Gampaha District
- Divisional Secretariat: Attanagalla Divisional Secretariat
- Electoral District: Gampaha Electoral District
- Polling Division: Attanagalla Polling Division

Area
  - Total: 0.93 km^{2} (0.36 sq mi)
- Elevation: 37 m (121 ft)

Population (2012)
  - Total: 986
  - Density: 1,060/km^{2} (2,700/sq mi)
- ISO 3166 code: LK-1227735

Ruwanpura

Ruwanpura Grama Niladhari Division is a Grama Niladhari Division of the Attanagalla Divisional Secretariat of Gampaha District of Western Province, Sri Lanka. It has Grama Niladhari Division Code 370B.

Ruwanpura is a surrounded by the Opathella, Aruppassa, Happitiya, Lavulupitiya, Lavulupitiya, Paranagama, Paranagama East, Walgammulla and Walgammulla Grama Niladhari Divisions.

== Demographics ==
=== Ethnicity ===
The Ruwanpura Grama Niladhari Division has a Sinhalese majority (100.0%). In comparison, the Attanagalla Divisional Secretariat (which contains the Ruwanpura Grama Niladhari Division) has a Sinhalese majority (86.6%) and a significant Moor population (11.9%)

Ethnicity in Ruwanpura
1. Sinhalese (100.0%)
2. Other (0.00%)

=== Religion ===
The Ruwanpura Grama Niladhari Division has a Buddhist majority (99.9%). In comparison, the Attanagalla Divisional Secretariat (which contains the Ruwanpura Grama Niladhari Division) has a Buddhist majority (84.5%) and a significant Muslim population (12.4%)

Religion in Ruwanpura
1. Buddhist (99.9%)
2. Other (0.10%)
