= Uruwala Valagamba Raja Maha Vihara =

Buddhist temple in Uruwala, Sri Lanka

Uruwala Valagamba Raja Maha Vihara (English: Uruwala Valagamba Great Royal Temple)
- ඌරුවල වලගම්බා රජ මහා විහාරය
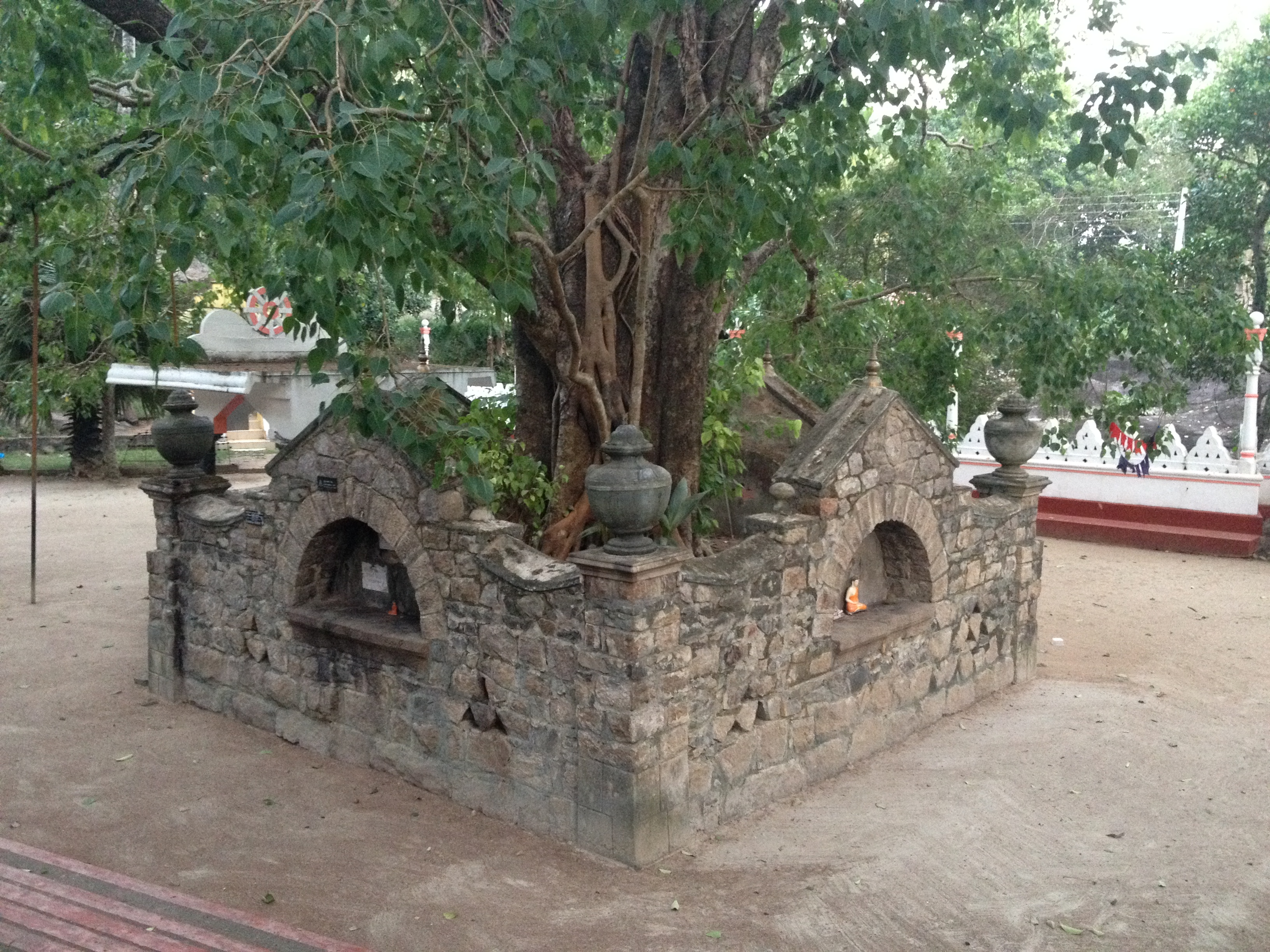
- The ancient Sacred Fig tree and its rampart

Religion
- Affiliation: Buddhism
- District: Gampaha
- Province: Western Province

Location
- Location: Uruwala, Gampaha, Sri Lanka
- Interactive map of Uruwala Valagamba Raja Maha Vihara (English: Uruwala Valagamba Great Royal Temple)
- Coordinates: 07°03′22.9″N 80°03′06.6″E

Architecture
- Type: Buddhist Temple

Uruwala Valagamba Raja Maha Vihara (Sinhalaː ඌරුවල වලගම්බා රජ මහා විහාරය, , English: Uruwala Valagamba Great Royal Temple) is an ancient Buddhist temple in Uruwala, Sri Lanka. The temple is located on Wathurugama road and approximately 4.71 km (2.93 mi) away from Miriswatta junction. The temple has been formally recognized by the Government as an archaeological site in Sri Lanka. As part of the name of several temples, Raja Maha Vihara means in English: Great Royal Temple or Great Royal Monastery. It designates ancient Sri Lankan Buddhist temples that historically received royal patronage and donations from the king.

Pilikuththuwa, Maligatenna, Warana, Miriswatta and Koskandawala cave temples, situated in the vicinity of the Uruwala temple are said to have been formed one major temple complex in the early Anuradhapura period.

== See also ==
- List of Archaeological Protected Monuments in Sri Lanka
