= Koskandawala Raja Maha Vihara =

Buddhist temple in Koskandawala, Sri Lanka

- කොස්කඳවල රජ මහා විහාරය
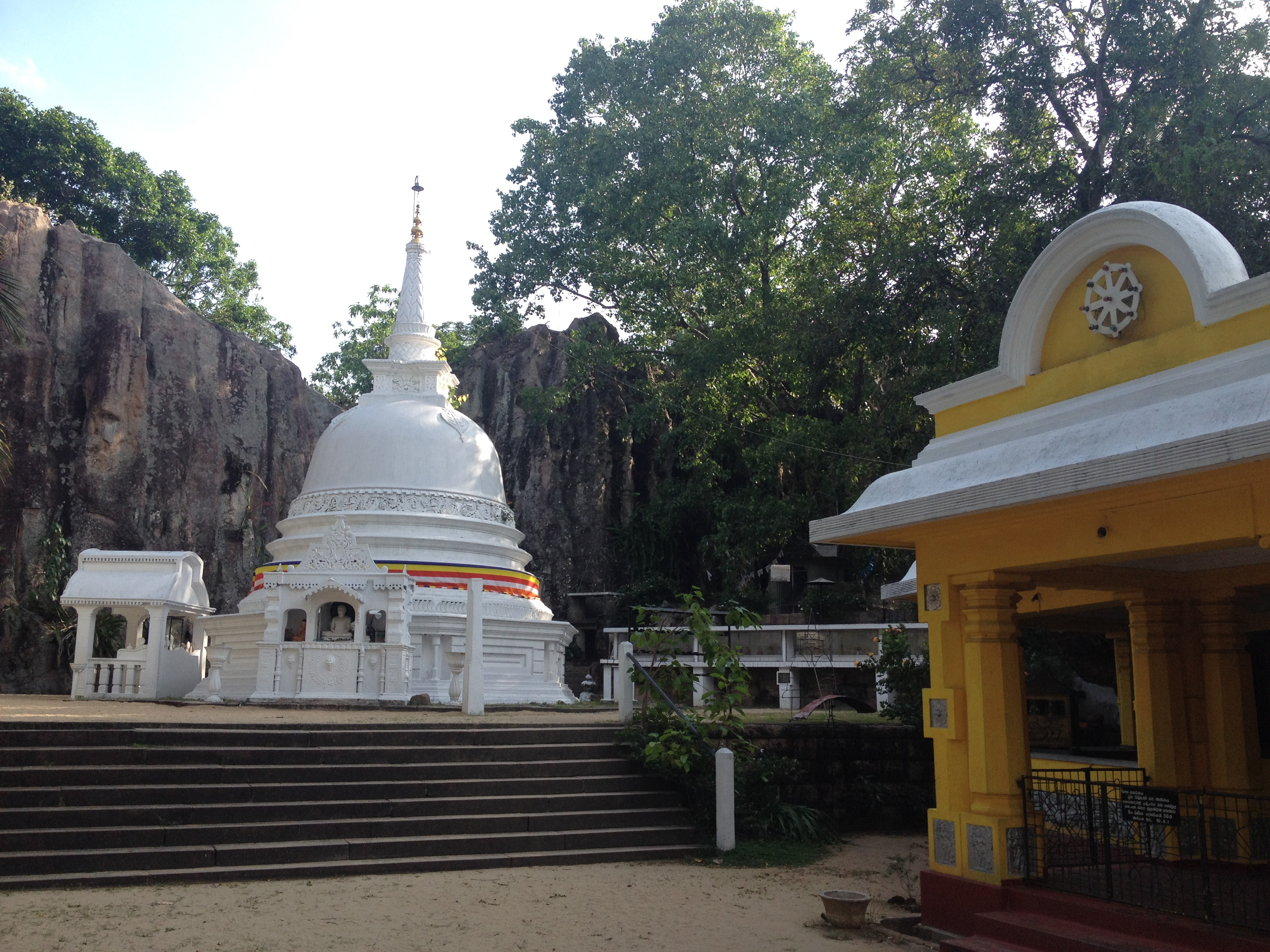
- The Stupa and image house at Koskandawala Vihara

Religion
- Affiliation: Buddhism
- District: Gampaha
- Province: Western Province

Location
- Location: Koskandawala, Sri Lanka
- Interactive map of Koskandawala Raja Maha Vihara
- Coordinates: 07°04′46.8″N 80°03′08.2″E

Architecture
- Type: Buddhist Temple
- Style: Cave temple

Koskandawala Sri Sunandarama Piriven Raja Maha Vihara (Sinhalaː කොස්කඳවල ශ්‍රී සුනන්දාරාම පිරිවෙන් රජ මහා විහාරය) is an old Buddhist temple in Koskandawala, Sri Lanka. The temple is located on Yakkala – Radawana road approximately 2.66 km (1.66 mi) away from Yakkala town. The temple has been formally recognized by the Government as an archaeological site in Sri Lanka.

Uruwala, Maligatenna, Warana, Miriswatta and Pilikuththuwa cave temples, situated in the vicinity of the Koskandawala temple are said to have been formed from one major temple complex in the early Anuradhapura period.

== See also ==
- List of Archaeological Protected Monuments in Sri Lanka
