= Ambagamuwa =

Ambagamuwa may refer to:

- Ambagamuwa (7°1'N 80°28'E), a village in Sri Lanka
- Ambagamuwa (7°18'N 80°33'E), a village in Sri Lanka
- Ambagamuwa Divisional Secretariat, Sri Lanka
