= Kotiyagala (Ambagamuwa) Grama Niladhari Division =

Kotiyagala
- Grama Niladhari Division
- Interactive map of Kotiyagala
- Coordinates: 6.786130°N 80.684221°E
- Country: Sri Lanka
- Province: Central Province
- District: Nuwara Eliya District
- Divisional Secretariat: Ambagamuwa Divisional Secretariat
- Electoral District: Nuwara-Eliya Electoral District
- Polling Division: Nuwara Eliya Maskeliya Polling Division

Area
  - Total: 4.98 km^{2} (1.92 sq mi)
- Elevation: 1,380 m (4,530 ft)

Population (2012)
  - Total: 3,033
  - Density: 609/km^{2} (1,580/sq mi)
- ISO 3166 code: LK-2315320

Kotiyagala

Kotiyagala Grama Niladhari Division is a Grama Niladhari Division of the Ambagamuwa Divisional Secretariat of Nuwara Eliya District of Central Province, Sri Lanka. It has Grama Niladhari Division Code 319P.

Kotiyagala is a surrounded by the Bogawana, Bagawanthalawa South and Loinon Grama Niladhari Divisions.

== Demographics ==
=== Ethnicity ===
The Kotiyagala Grama Niladhari Division has an Indian Tamil majority (90.0%). In comparison, the Ambagamuwa Divisional Secretariat (which contains the Kotiyagala Grama Niladhari Division) has an Indian Tamil majority (71.6%) and a significant Sinhalese population (21.6%)

Ethnicity in Kotiyagala
1. Indian Tamil (90.0%)
2. Moor (8.10%)
3. Sinhalese (1.00%)
4. Other (0.90%)

=== Religion ===
The Kotiyagala Grama Niladhari Division has a Hindu majority (77.2%) and a significant Roman Catholic population (12.0%). In comparison, the Ambagamuwa Divisional Secretariat (which contains the Kotiyagala Grama Niladhari Division) has a Hindu majority (66.6%) and a significant Buddhist population (21.4%)

Religion in Kotiyagala
1. Hindu (77.2%)
2. Roman Catholic (12.0%)
3. Muslim (8.70%)
4. Buddhist (1.10%)
5. Other Christian (1.10%)
6. Other (0.00%)
