= Aluthepola Ganekanda Raja Maha Vihara =

Sri Lankan Buddhist temple

Aluthepola Ganekande Purana Raja Maha Vihara (English: Aluthepola Ganekanda Great Royal Temple)
- අළුතෑපොල ගණේකන්ද පුරාණ රජ මහා විහාරය
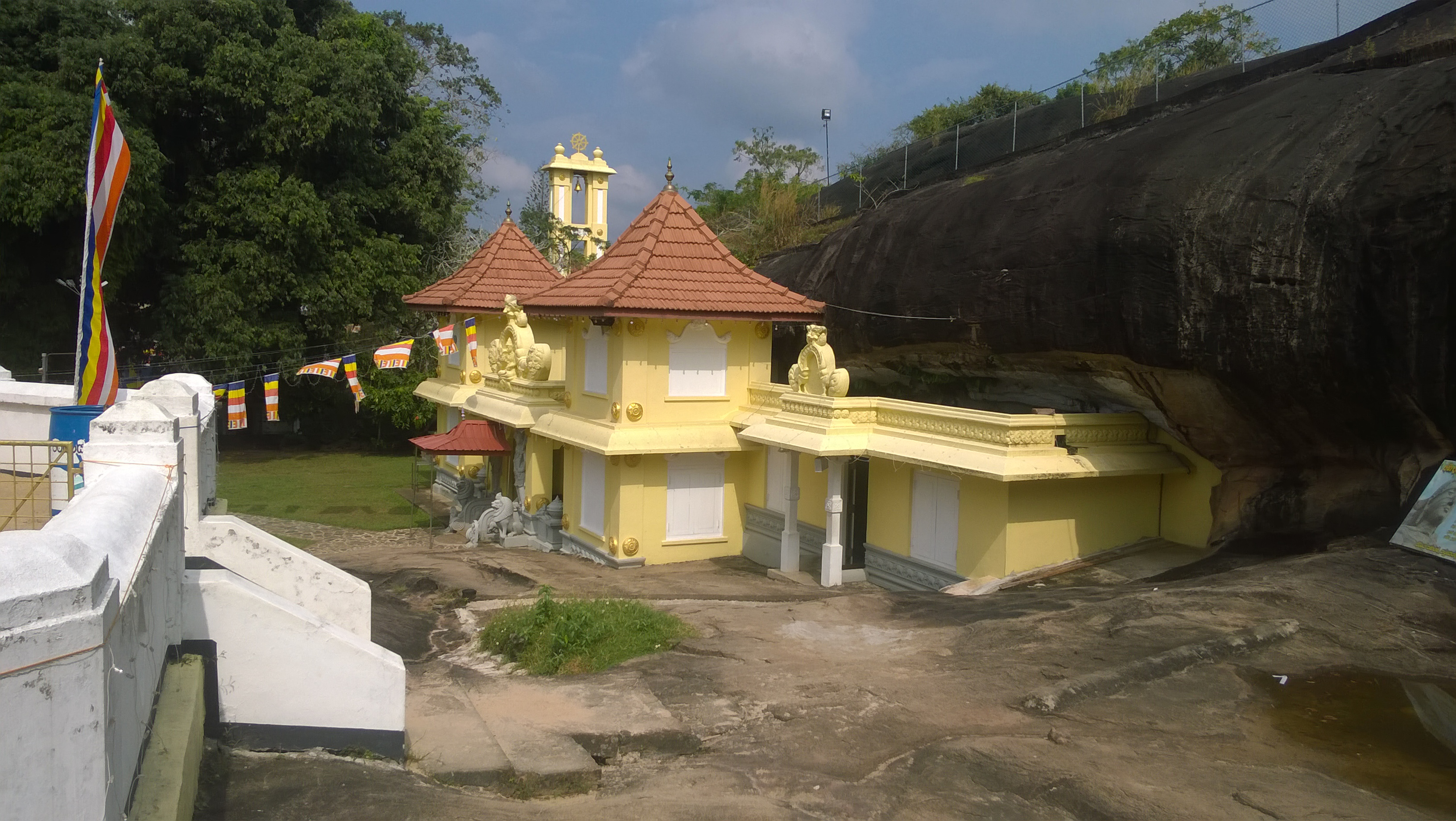
- The image house

Religion
- Affiliation: Buddhism
- District: Gampaha
- Province: Western Province

Location
- Location: Aluthepola, Minuwangoda
- Interactive map of Aluthepola Ganekande Purana Raja Maha Vihara (English: Aluthepola Ganekanda Great Royal Temple)
- Coordinates: 07°12′21.16″N 79°57′44.59″E

Architecture
- Type: Buddhist Temple
- Style: Cave temple

Aluthepola Ganekanda Raja Maha Vihara (Also known as Aluthepola Vihara) (Sinhala: අළුතෑපොල විහාරය, English: Aluthepola Ganekanda Great Royal Temple) is an old Buddhist temple in Minuwangoda, Sri Lanka. According to the regional folklore this temple is believed to be one of places where King Valagamba spent his time when five Dravidian were ruling Anuradhapura. The temple has been formally recognised by the Government as an archaeological site in Sri Lanka. The designation was declared on 22 November 2002 under the government Gazette number 1264.

As part of the name of several temples, Raja Maha Vihara means in English: Great Royal Temple or Great Royal Monastery. It designates ancient Sri Lankan Buddhist temples that historically received royal patronage and donations from the king.
