= Sri Saddharmagupta Piriven Vihara =

- ශ්‍රී සද්ධර්මගුප්ත පිරිවෙන් විහාරය
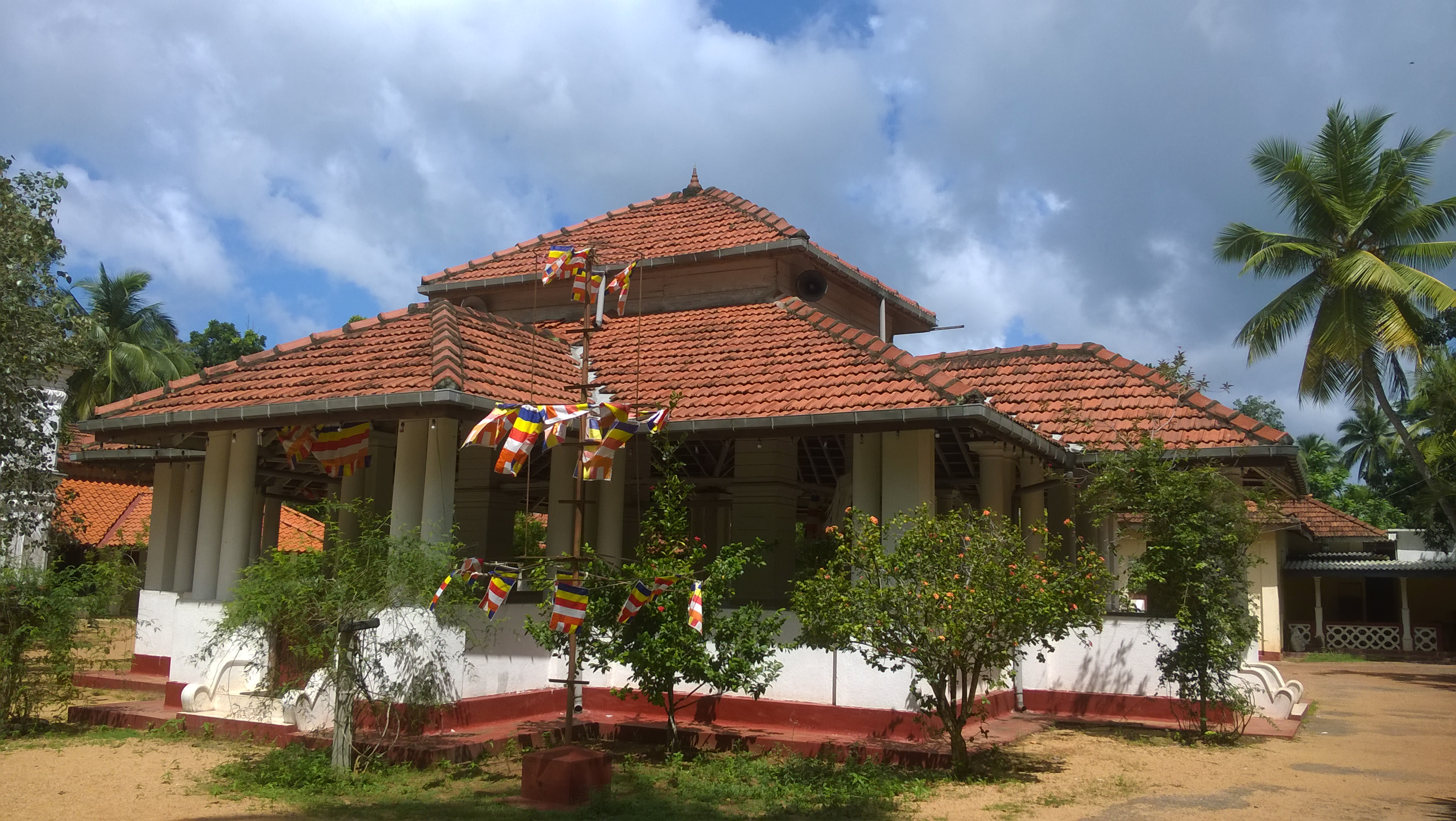
- The preaching hall at the Vihara.

Religion
- Affiliation: Buddhism
- District: Gampaha
- Province: Western Province

Location
- Location: Dombawela, Udugampola, Sri Lanka
- Interactive map of Sri Saddharmagupta Piriven Vihara
- Coordinates: 07°07′26.4″N 79°59′04.2″E

Architecture
- Type: Buddhist Temple

Sri Saddharmagupta Piriven Vihara (Sinhala: ශ්‍රී සද්ධර්මගුප්ත පිරිවෙන් විහාරය) is an old Piriven Vihara in Dombawela, Sri Lanka. The temple is located on Udugampola – Divulapitiya road approximately 0.5 km (0.31 mi) away from the Udugampola Roundabout. The temple has been formally recognised by the Government as an archaeological protected monument in Sri Lanka.

== The temple ==
The temple consists mainly of a Stupa, image house, Bodhi Tree, bell tower, preaching hall, library and Bhikku dwellings. The old library building of the Vihara was conserved in 2010 by the archaeological department. The Dhamma discourse hall is built in the middle of the grounds of the Vihara and its canopy is decorated with old floral diagrams and other various designs.
