= Malwana fort =

- Malwana, Sri Lanka

Site information
- Type: Defence fort
- Condition: Remnants

Location
- Coordinates: 6.925593°N 80.022208°E

Site history
- Built: 1590s
- Built by: Portuguese

Malwana fort (Sinhala: මල්වාන බලකොටුව Malwana Balakothuwa) was located in Malwana, Gampaha, on the banks of the Kelani River. It was built by Portuguese in 1590s. The small fort served as a residence for the Portuguese Governor or Captain-Generals. Records indicate that a company of 70 soldiers were stationed at the fort. The fort was attacked by Kandyan forces in the 1630s. The Portuguese subsequently abandoned it and focused their forces on Colombo fort and its defence.

There are records that indicate that the fort was also used by Dutch, with approx. 20–80 Dutch soldiers stationed there. It is likely that they would have reconstructed the fort during that time, although they later abandoned it as well.

There are also stories that allege that Bhuvanaikabahu VII was assassinated by the Portuguese when he visited the Malwana fort.

On 24 July 2009 the fort was formally declared an Archaeological Protected Monument by the government.
