= Panasawanarama Purana Vihara =

- පණසවනාරාම පුරාණ විහාරය
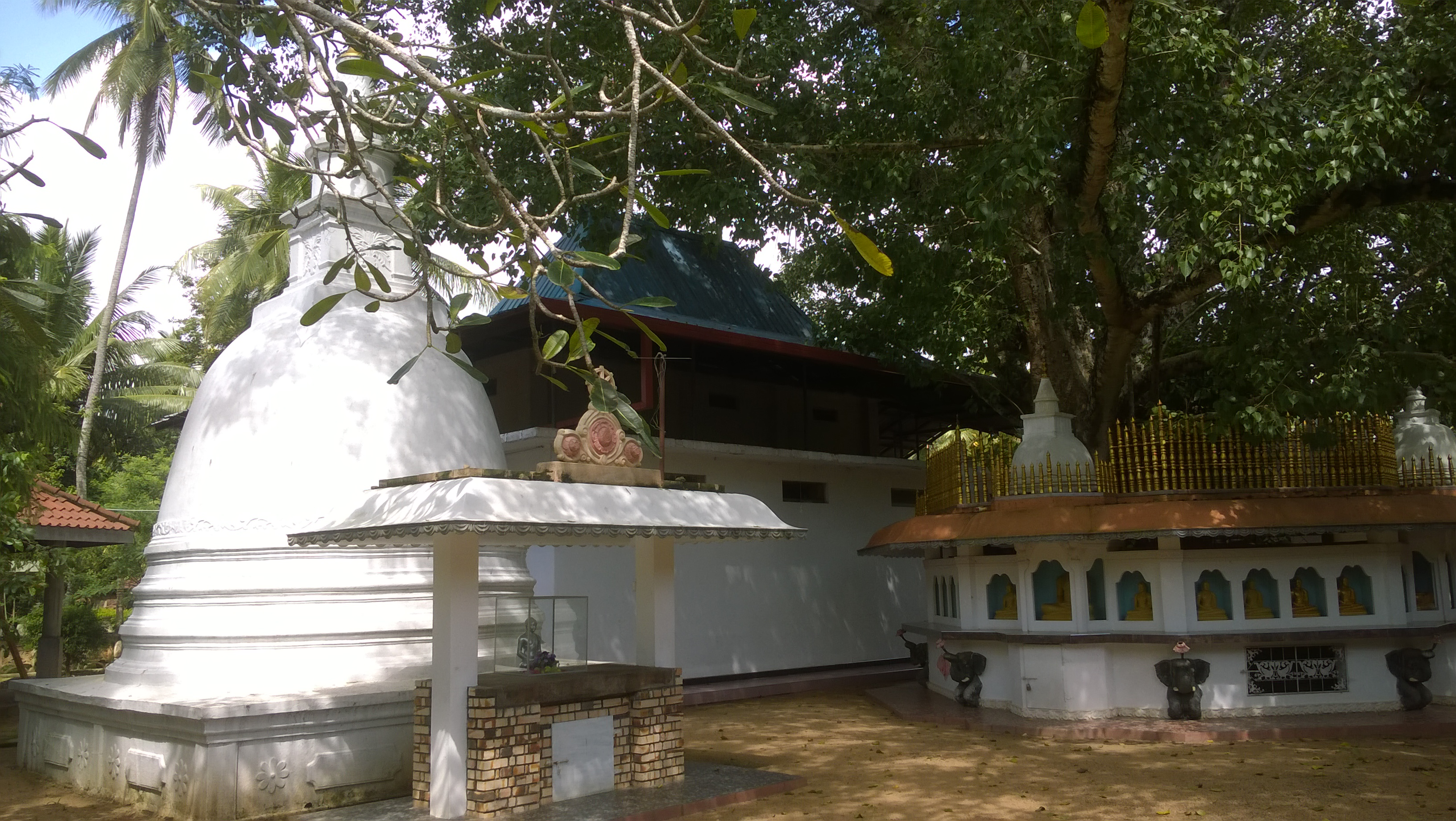
- The Stupa, Bodhi tree and image house at the Vihara

Religion
- Affiliation: Buddhism
- District: Gampaha
- Province: Western Province

Location
- Location: Kospillewa, Sri Lanka
- Interactive map of Panasawanarama Purana Vihara
- Coordinates: 07°07′44.2″N 79°59′48.2″E

Architecture
- Type: Buddhist Temple

Panasawanarama Purana Vihara (Sinhalese: පණසවනාරාම පුරාණ විහාරය) is a Buddhist temple in Kospillewa, Sri Lanka. The temple is located on Udugampola – Divulapitiya road approximately 2 km (1.2 mi) away from Udugampola town. The temple has been formally recognised by the Government as an archaeological site in Sri Lanka. The designation was declared on 22 November 2002 under the government Gazette number 1264.
