= St. Anne's Church, Wattala =

Roman Catholic church in Wattala, Sri Lanka

- සා. ආනා දේවස්ථානය, වත්තල
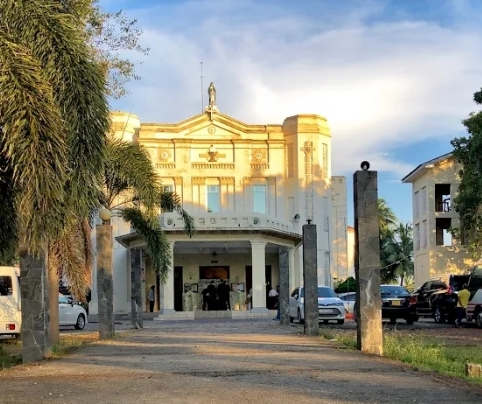
- Front view of St. Anne's Church

- Location in Sri Lanka
- 6.98231°N 79.88996°E
- Country: Sri Lanka
- Language(s): Sinhala; English; Latin
- Denomination: Roman Catholic
- Tradition: Roman(Latin)

History
- Status: Parish Church
- Founded: 7 August 1872; 153 years ago
- Dedication: Saint Anne

Architecture
- Functional status: Active

Administration
- District: Gampaha District
- Province: Western Province
- Metropolis: Colombo
- Archdiocese: Archdiocese of Colombo
- Parish: Wattala Parish

Clergy
- Archbishop: Malcolm Ranjith
- Priest: Gregory Jayantha Emmanuel Dilshan

St. Anne's Church, Wattala (Sinhala: සා. ආනා දේවස්ථානය, වත්තල is a Roman Catholic church located in Wattala, Gampaha District, Sri Lanka. It was established in 1872 as another Church of the Archdiocese of Colombo. The church is dedicated to Saint Anne.

== See also ==
- St. Sebastian's Church, Wattala
- St. Anne's Balika Maha Vidyalaya, Wattala
- St. Anthony's College, Wattala
