= Kirindiwela =

Kirindiwela කිරිඳිවැල கிரிண்டிவேலா
- Town
- Location within Sri Lanka
- Coordinates: 7°02′N 80°08′E
- Country: Sri Lanka
- Province: Western Province
- Time zone: UTC+5:30 (Sri Lanka Standard Time)

Kirindiwela (Sinhala: කිරින්දිවැල, Tamil: கிரிண்டிவேலா) is a town in the Western Province of Sri Lanka. It is the main administrative centre for the "Dompe" electorate in Gampaha district. The postal code of Kirindiwela is 11730. Kirindiwela is connected to the Colombo Avissawella road and the Colombo Kandy road. It is also connected to the New Kandy road from Weliweriya towards Kaduwela.

== Government Institutions ==
- Assistant Government Agent's office Local administrative centre of the central government (Dompe Divisional Secretariat)
- Village council statard in 1949
- Dompe Pradeshiya Sabhawa Local government office
- Kirindiwela Police Station

== Transportation ==
The Kirindiwela bus depot provides a local public transport centre and the garage run by the Sri Lanka Transport Board.

== Education ==
- Kirindiwela Madya Maha Vidyalaya: Central College
- Kirindiwela Maha Vidyalaya: High School
- Kirindiwela Sangamittha Balika Vidyalaya:

== Notable institutions ==
- Meethirigala Nissarana Vanaya: a Buddhist meditation centre established in 1967 (alternative spelling 'Mithirigala')
- Vedagama: ('Village of Healing’) Only village in Sri Lanka completely populated by indigenous medical practitioners, established as a part of President Ranasinghe Premadasa’s “Gam Udawa ” (Village Awakening) program.

== Notable people ==
- Mahagama Sekara
- K. Jayatillake

== See also ==
- List of towns in Sri Lanka
