= Dewalapola =

Dewalapola දෙවලපොල தேவலபோல
- town
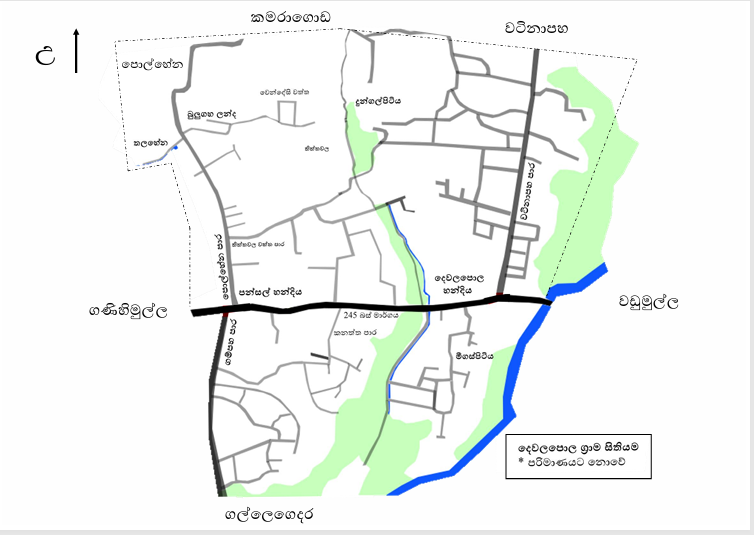
- Route map of Dewalapola

- Location in Sri Lanka
- Coordinates: 7°10′6″N 79°59′40″E
- Country: Sri Lanka
- Province: Western Province
- District: Gampaha District

Government
  - Municipal Council: Minuwangoda
  - Headquarters: Grama Niladhari Division (106)

Area
  - Total: 15.00 km^{2} (5.79 sq mi)
- Elevation: 23 m (75 ft)

Population
  - Total: ~ 2,250
  - Density: 150/km^{2} (390/sq mi)
- Time zone: UTC+05:30 (SLST)
- Postal code: 11102
- Area code: 011
- Website: www.minuwangoda.ds.gov.lk

Dewalapola is a small rural area in Minuwangoda Divisional Secretariate of Gampaha District, Western Province, Sri Lanka. It is situated on the 245/1 Nittambuwa - Katunayake / Airport bus route between Veyangoda and Minuwangoda.

The major landuses in the area are rubber, coconut, MHG, rice and pineapples. Dewalapola is the home of Sri Sudarshanarama Purana Viharaya, Minu / Ananda Maha Vidyalaya (AMV), a public library, a post office and an Ayurvedic Center of the Department Of Ayurveda, Ministry Of Indigenous Medicine.

== Etymology ==
The name Dewalapola is a compound formed of Dewele (of two times) and Pola (place) which means a place that used twice (a day). Accordance with the historical scripts found in Sri Lanka, for example Mahawamsa and Rajavaliya, Udugampola Rajadhaniya (the Kingdom of Udugampola) was being ruled by King Sakalakala Wallabha when his elder half brother, Buwanakabahu, owned the throne under the name of Dharma Parakramabahu IX(1508 AD - 1528 AD) of the Kingdom of Kotte succeeding his father King Veera Parakramabahu.

King Sakalakala Wallabha with one of his Raja Shilpis, named Balasuriya Kankanama, the devoted superintendent of irrigation of the kingdom, used to take rest for refreshments at Dewalapola twice a day on his way to and from the construction site of Mabodale wewa.

== Demographic ==
=== Population by Age ===
Age Group	Number
18>x	974
18<x	1252
Total	2226

As a percentage.
1. under 18 (43.8%)
2. Over 18 (56.2%)
3. Other (0.00%)

== See also ==
- Mahawamsa
- Kingdom of Kotte
- Udugampola
- Mabodale
