= Pilikuththuwa Raja Maha Vihara =

Ancient Cave temple in Pilikuththuwa, Sri Lanka

- පිළිකුත්තුව රජ මහා විහාරය
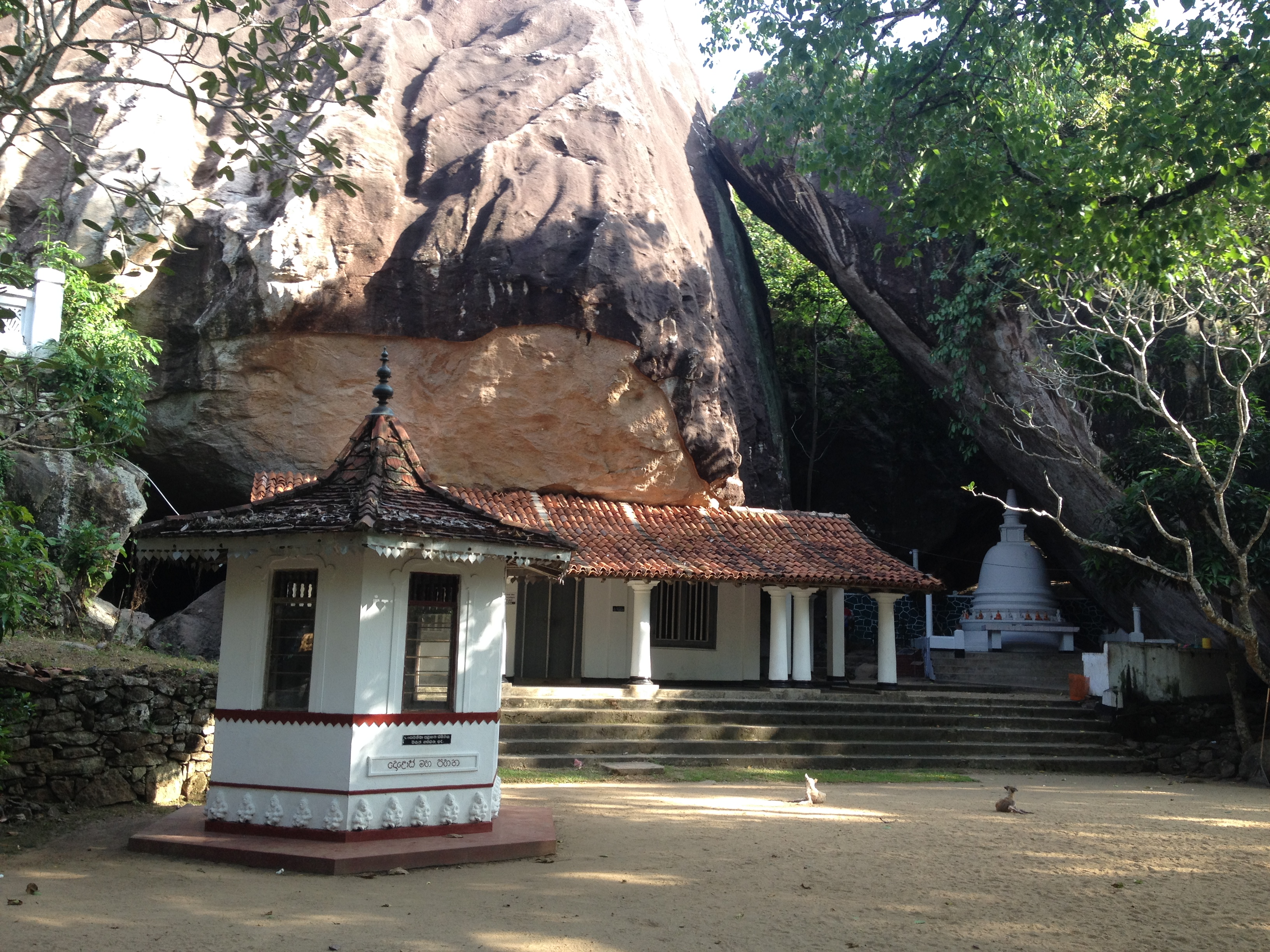

Religion
- Affiliation: Buddhism
- District: Gampaha
- Province: Western Province

Location
- Location: Pilikuththuwa, Sri Lanka
- Interactive map of Pilikuththuwa Raja Maha Vihara
- Coordinates: 07°03′50.2″N 80°03′01.1″E

Architecture
- Type: Buddhist Temple
- Style: Cave temple

Pilikuththuwa Raja Maha Vihara (Sinhalaː පිළිකුත්තුව රජ මහා විහාරය ) is an ancient Cave temple situated in Pilikuththuwa, Sri Lanka. It is located on the Gampaha - Wathurugama road approximately 3.8 km (2.4 mi) away from the Miriswatta junction and 1.6 km (0.99 mi) from the ancient Buddhist temple, Maligatenna Raja Maha Vihara. The temple has been formally recognised by the Government as an archaeological site in Sri Lanka.

== History ==
From the archaeological evidence, it is believed that this area has been inhabited since prehistoric times. Caves with drip ledges prove that the temple may have been used during the 2-3 century BC by the Sangha as their abodes. According to the legends connected with this temple, king Valagamba (89-77 BC) used to stay in this historical place from time to time during the invasion from South India.

Uruwala, Maligatenna, Warana, Miriswatta and Koskandawala cave temples, situated in the vicinity of the Pilikuththuwa temple are said to have been formed from one major temple complex in the early Anuradhapura period.

== The temple ==
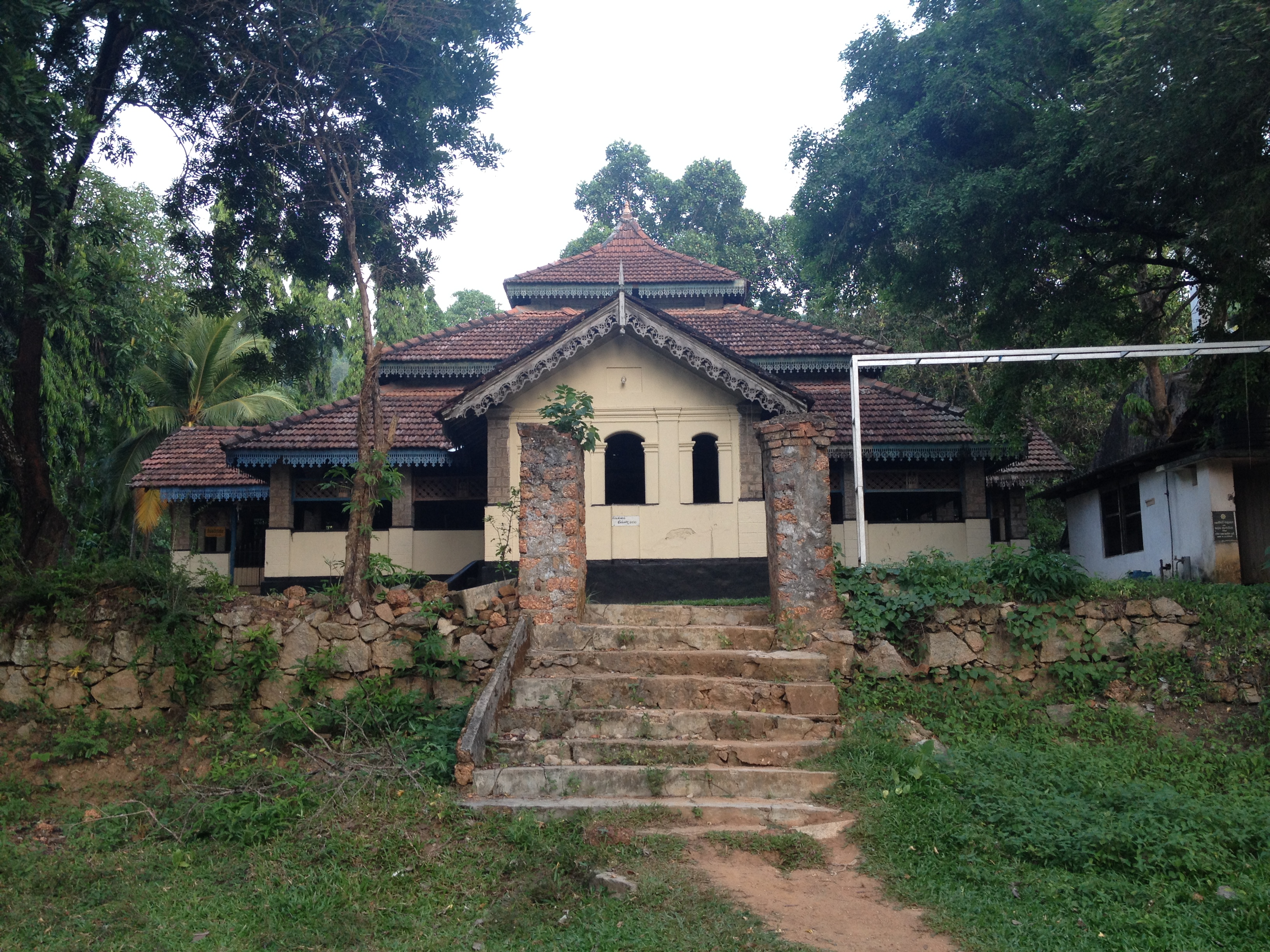
The Dharmasala building

The Pilikuththuwa temple is considered one of the Buddhist temples in the country with the highest number of drip-ledged rock caves. It is said that this temple has 99 rock caves with drip ledges, spreading about 200 acres of total area. As of today, 78 caves have been identified.

Beside the rock caves, inscription with pre-Brahmi characters belonging to the 3rd century CE, drip-ledged caves, the pond made with Cairn of stones, ancient mould creeper, a wooden bridge belonging to the Kandyan period, the Dagoba with its natural Vatadage, ancient reservoir, roads, water pools, and natural water ponds, increase the historical importance of this site. On 1 November 1996, the archaeological department declared the image house of the temple as a monument under the government Gazette number 948. In 2002, all the caves with drip ledges, the Awasageya (Bhikkhu dwellings), the wooden bridge, the pond, the Dagoba with drip ledged cave and stone inscriptions belonging to the temple were declared as protected monuments. The Darmasala building (preaching hall) was included into the list on 15 April 2016.
