= Dompe Divisional Secretariat =

- Divisional Secretariat
- Country: Sri Lanka
- Province: Western Province
- District: Gampaha District
- Time zone: UTC+5:30 (Sri Lanka Standard Time)
- Website: http://dompe.ds.gov.lk/

Dompe Divisional Secretariat is a Divisional Secretariat of Gampaha District, of Western Province, Sri Lanka.

== Demography ==
Religion in Dompe DS Division (2012)
1. Buddhist (94.5%)
2. Hindu (0.30%)
3. Muslim (1.60%)
4. Roman Catholic (3.00%)
5. Other Christian (0.50%)
6. Other (0.00%)

== History ==
Dompe Divisional Secretariat is considered one of initial divisional secretariats, established in Sri Lanka. Formerly it was known as Weke Sub Secretarial Office from 1992. In 1996 the name of Weke was changed as Dompe Divisional Secretariat.
