= Attanagalla =

Attanagalla අත්තනගල්ල அத்தநாகல்லா
- Location within Sri Lanka
- Coordinates: 7°06′N 80°07′E
- Country: Sri Lanka
- Province: Western
- District: Gampaha

Attanagalla is an electorate in Gampaha District, situated in the Western Province of Sri Lanka.
