= Mirigama Polling Division =

Mirigama
- Polling Division
- Coordinates: 7.221769°N 80.115856°E
- Country: Sri Lanka
- Province: Western Province, Sri Lanka
- Electoral District: Gampaha Electoral District

Area
  - Total: 197.07 km^{2} (76.09 sq mi)

Population (2012)
  - Total: 164,580
  - Density: 835/km^{2} (2,160/sq mi)
- ISO 3166 code: EC-02E

The Mirigama Polling Division is a Polling Division in the Gampaha Electoral District, in the Western Province, Sri Lanka.

== Presidential Election Results ==
=== Summary ===
The winner of Mirigama has matched the final country result 6 out of 8 times. Hence, Mirigama is a Weak Bellwether for Presidential Elections.

Year	Mirigama	Gampaha Electoral District	MAE %	Sri Lanka	MAE %
2019	SLPP	SLPP	0.23%	SLPP	7.17%
2015	UPFA	NDF	3.26%	NDF	4.90%
2010	UPFA	UPFA	2.04%	UPFA	5.37%
2005	UPFA	UPFA	0.27%	UPFA	4.56%
1999	PA	PA	2.89%	PA	2.33%
1994	PA	PA	1.54%	PA	0.72%
1988	SLFP	SLFP	0.60%	UNP	3.42%
1982	UNP	UNP	0.97%	UNP	1.51%
Matches/Mean MAE	6/8	7/8	1.47%	8/8	3.75%

=== 2019 Sri Lankan Presidential Election ===
Party	Mirigama		Gampaha Electoral District		Sri Lanka	
Party	Votes	%	Votes	%	Votes	%
SLPP	61,478	59.53%	855,870	59.28%	6,924,255	52.25%
NDF	35,184	34.07%	494,671	34.26%	5,564,239	41.99%
NMPP	4,720	4.57%	61,760	4.28%	418,553	3.16%
Other Parties (with < 1%)	1,897	1.84%	31,499	2.18%	345,452	2.61%
Valid Votes	103,279	99.06%	1,443,800	98.92%	13,252,499	98.99%
Rejected Votes	981	0.94%	15,751	1.08%	135,452	1.01%
Total Polled	104,260	83.68%	1,459,551	83.31%	13,387,951	83.71%
Registered Electors	124,599		1,751,892		15,992,568	

=== 2015 Sri Lankan Presidential Election ===
Party	Mirigama		Gampaha Electoral District		Sri Lanka	
Party	Votes	%	Votes	%	Votes	%
UPFA	51,244	52.75%	664,347	49.49%	5,768,090	47.58%
NDF	45,202	46.53%	669,007	49.83%	6,217,162	51.28%
Other Parties (with < 1%)	701	0.72%	9,142	0.68%	138,200	1.14%
Valid Votes	97,147	99.10%	1,342,496	98.92%	12,123,452	98.85%
Rejected Votes	880	0.90%	14,647	1.08%	140,925	1.15%
Total Polled	98,027	78.62%	1,357,143	80.77%	12,264,377	78.69%
Registered Electors	124,679		1,680,263		15,585,942	

=== 2010 Sri Lankan Presidential Election ===
Party	Mirigama		Gampaha Electoral District		Sri Lanka	
Party	Votes	%	Votes	%	Votes	%
UPFA	54,697	63.65%	718,716	61.66%	6,015,934	57.88%
NDF	30,169	35.11%	434,506	37.28%	4,173,185	40.15%
Other Parties (with < 1%)	1,067	1.24%	12,426	1.07%	204,494	1.97%
Valid Votes	85,933	99.17%	1,165,648	99.24%	10,393,613	99.03%
Rejected Votes	719	0.83%	8,960	0.76%	101,838	0.97%
Total Polled	86,652	75.64%	1,174,608	78.03%	10,495,451	66.70%
Registered Electors	114,566		1,505,363		15,734,587	

=== 2005 Sri Lankan Presidential Election ===
Party	Mirigama		Gampaha Electoral District		Sri Lanka	
Party	Votes	%	Votes	%	Votes	%
UPFA	45,537	55.00%	596,698	54.78%	4,887,152	50.29%
UNP	36,345	43.89%	481,764	44.23%	4,706,366	48.43%
Other Parties (with < 1%)	919	1.11%	10,815	0.99%	123,521	1.27%
Valid Votes	82,801	98.83%	1,089,277	98.94%	9,717,039	98.88%
Rejected Votes	982	1.17%	11,724	1.06%	109,869	1.12%
Total Polled	83,783	77.90%	1,101,001	79.17%	9,826,908	69.51%
Registered Electors	107,553		1,390,691		14,136,979	

=== 1999 Sri Lankan Presidential Election ===
Party	Mirigama		Gampaha Electoral District		Sri Lanka	
Party	Votes	%	Votes	%	Votes	%
PA	38,075	52.86%	532,796	56.58%	4,312,157	51.12%
UNP	28,456	39.51%	353,969	37.59%	3,602,748	42.71%
JVP	4,213	5.85%	40,472	4.30%	343,927	4.08%
Other Parties (with < 1%)	1,281	1.78%	14,382	1.53%	176,679	2.09%
Valid Votes	72,025	97.80%	941,619	97.84%	8,435,754	97.69%
Rejected Votes	1,619	2.20%	20,768	2.16%	199,536	2.31%
Total Polled	73,644	75.99%	962,387	77.12%	8,635,290	72.17%
Registered Electors	96,907		1,247,860		11,965,536	

=== 1994 Sri Lankan Presidential Election ===
Party	Mirigama		Gampaha Electoral District		Sri Lanka	
Party	Votes	%	Votes	%	Votes	%
PA	40,288	63.13%	550,654	64.74%	4,709,205	62.28%
UNP	22,585	35.39%	288,608	33.93%	2,715,283	35.91%
Other Parties (with < 1%)	948	1.49%	11,256	1.32%	137,040	1.81%
Valid Votes	63,821	97.78%	850,518	98.48%	7,561,526	98.03%
Rejected Votes	1,446	2.22%	13,137	1.52%	151,706	1.97%
Total Polled	65,267	72.96%	863,655	74.16%	7,713,232	69.12%
Registered Electors	89,455		1,164,625		11,158,880	

=== 1988 Sri Lankan Presidential Election ===
Party	Mirigama		Gampaha Electoral District		Sri Lanka	
Party	Votes	%	Votes	%	Votes	%
SLFP	27,712	49.82%	355,553	48.83%	2,289,857	44.95%
UNP	26,835	48.25%	350,092	48.08%	2,569,199	50.43%
SLMP	1,074	1.93%	22,467	3.09%	235,701	4.63%
Valid Votes	55,621	98.48%	728,112	98.63%	5,094,754	98.24%
Rejected Votes	860	1.52%	10,108	1.37%	91,499	1.76%
Total Polled	56,481	71.54%	738,220	74.93%	5,186,256	55.87%
Registered Electors	78,953		985,206		9,283,143	

=== 1982 Sri Lankan Presidential Election ===
Party	Mirigama		Gampaha Electoral District		Sri Lanka	
Party	Votes	%	Votes	%	Votes	%
UNP	30,289	52.20%	365,847	52.50%	3,450,815	52.93%
SLFP	24,143	41.60%	301,808	43.31%	2,546,348	39.05%
JVP	3,186	5.49%	23,701	3.40%	273,428	4.19%
Other Parties (with < 1%)	412	0.71%	5,491	0.79%	249,460	3.83%
Valid Votes	58,030	99.18%	696,847	99.15%	6,520,156	98.78%
Rejected Votes	478	0.82%	5,992	0.85%	80,470	1.22%
Total Polled	58,508	82.76%	702,839	82.70%	6,600,626	80.15%
Registered Electors	70,695		849,896		8,235,358	

== Parliamentary Election Results ==
=== Summary ===
The winner of Mirigama has matched the final country result 6 out of 7 times. Hence, Mirigama is considered a Bellwether for Parliamentary Elections.

Year	Mirigama	Gampaha Electoral District	MAE %	Sri Lanka	MAE %
2015	UPFA	UNP	1.66%	UNP	2.11%
2010	UPFA	UPFA	2.82%	UPFA	4.76%
2004	UPFA	UPFA	1.18%	UPFA	4.01%
2001	UNP	UNP	1.22%	UNP	2.48%
2000	PA	PA	2.52%	PA	0.95%
1994	PA	PA	2.36%	PA	2.66%
1989	UNP	UNP	2.36%	UNP	5.58%
Matches/Mean MAE	6/7	7/7	2.02%	7/7	3.22%

=== 2015 Sri Lankan Parliamentary Election ===
Party	Mirigama		Gampaha Electoral District		Sri Lanka	
Party	Votes	%	Votes	%	Votes	%
UPFA	41,014	46.84%	549,958	44.96%	4,732,664	42.48%
UNP	39,794	45.45%	577,004	47.17%	5,098,916	45.77%
JVP	6,255	7.14%	87,880	7.18%	544,154	4.88%
Other Parties (with < 1%)	491	0.56%	8,332	0.68%	81,501	0.73%
Valid Votes	87,554	95.52%	1,223,174	95.51%	11,140,333	95.35%
Rejected Votes	3,997	4.36%	56,246	4.39%	516,926	4.42%
Total Polled	91,662	73.52%	1,280,647	78.21%	11,684,111	77.66%
Registered Electors	124,679		1,637,537		15,044,490	

=== 2010 Sri Lankan Parliamentary Election ===
Party	Mirigama		Gampaha Electoral District		Sri Lanka	
Party	Votes	%	Votes	%	Votes	%
UPFA	45,428	66.72%	589,476	63.40%	4,846,388	60.38%
UNP	17,971	26.40%	266,523	28.67%	2,357,057	29.37%
DNA	4,491	6.60%	69,747	7.50%	441,251	5.50%
Other Parties (with < 1%)	194	0.28%	3,985	0.43%	19,003	0.24%
Valid Votes	68,084	94.99%	929,731	94.83%	8,026,322	96.03%
Rejected Votes	3,522	4.91%	50,234	5.12%	581,465	6.96%
Total Polled	71,672	62.56%	980,467	65.06%	8,358,246	59.29%
Registered Electors	114,566		1,506,969		14,097,690	

=== 2004 Sri Lankan Parliamentary Election ===
Party	Mirigama		Gampaha Electoral District		Sri Lanka	
Party	Votes	%	Votes	%	Votes	%
UPFA	39,853	53.32%	509,963	51.52%	4,223,126	45.70%
UNP	27,523	36.83%	367,572	37.14%	3,486,792	37.73%
JHU	6,775	9.06%	102,516	10.36%	552,723	5.98%
Other Parties (with < 1%)	588	0.79%	9,691	0.98%	57,229	0.62%
Valid Votes	74,739	95.29%	989,742	95.96%	9,241,931	94.52%
Rejected Votes	3,677	4.69%	41,462	4.02%	534,452	5.47%
Total Polled	78,436	75.33%	1,031,464	77.72%	9,777,821	75.74%
Registered Electors	104,122		1,327,145		12,909,631	

=== 2001 Sri Lankan Parliamentary Election ===
Party	Mirigama		Gampaha Electoral District		Sri Lanka	
Party	Votes	%	Votes	%	Votes	%
UNP	33,405	44.16%	437,289	43.94%	4,086,026	45.62%
PA	31,014	41.00%	428,780	43.08%	3,330,815	37.19%
JVP	10,143	13.41%	113,990	11.45%	815,353	9.10%
Other Parties (with < 1%)	1,084	1.43%	15,171	1.52%	137,826	1.54%
Valid Votes	75,646	95.78%	995,230	96.30%	8,955,844	94.77%
Rejected Votes	3,330	4.22%	38,187	3.70%	494,009	5.23%
Total Polled	78,976	78.32%	1,033,417	80.36%	9,449,878	76.03%
Registered Electors	100,833		1,285,973		12,428,762	

=== 2000 Sri Lankan Parliamentary Election ===
Party	Mirigama		Gampaha Electoral District		Sri Lanka	
Party	Votes	%	Votes	%	Votes	%
PA	33,116	45.74%	470,018	48.87%	3,899,329	45.33%
UNP	30,025	41.47%	378,328	39.34%	3,451,765	40.12%
JVP	6,732	9.30%	73,110	7.60%	518,725	6.03%
NUA	982	1.36%	11,013	1.15%	185,593	2.16%
SU	813	1.12%	20,297	2.11%	127,859	1.49%
Other Parties (with < 1%)	737	1.02%	8,943	0.93%	133,530	1.55%
Valid Votes	72,405	N/A	961,709	N/A	8,602,617	N/A

=== 1994 Sri Lankan Parliamentary Election ===
Party	Mirigama		Gampaha Electoral District		Sri Lanka	
Party	Votes	%	Votes	%	Votes	%
PA	37,512	54.28%	509,030	56.79%	3,887,805	48.94%
UNP	30,492	44.12%	375,631	41.91%	3,498,370	44.04%
SLPF	1,100	1.59%	11,627	1.30%	90,078	1.13%
Valid Votes	69,104	96.19%	896,288	96.39%	7,943,688	95.20%
Rejected Votes	2,739	3.81%	33,553	3.61%	400,395	4.80%
Total Polled	71,843	80.31%	929,841	79.65%	8,344,095	74.75%
Registered Electors	89,455		1,167,469		11,163,064	

=== 1989 Sri Lankan Parliamentary Election ===
Party	Mirigama		Gampaha Electoral District		Sri Lanka	
Party	Votes	%	Votes	%	Votes	%
UNP	33,179	56.87%	385,733	54.14%	2,838,005	50.71%
SLFP	22,985	39.40%	294,490	41.34%	1,785,369	31.90%
ELJP	1,618	2.77%	10,549	1.48%	67,723	1.21%
Other Parties (with < 1%)	557	0.95%	21,665	3.04%	141,983	2.54%
Valid Votes	58,339	95.56%	712,437	95.64%	5,596,468	93.87%
Rejected Votes	2,713	4.44%	32,497	4.36%	365,563	6.13%
Total Polled	61,052	79.04%	744,934	76.82%	5,962,031	63.60%
Registered Electors	77,242		969,658		9,374,164	

== Demographics ==
=== Ethnicity ===
The Mirigama Polling Division has a Sinhalese majority (94.7%) . In comparison, the Gampaha Electoral District (which contains the Mirigama Polling Division) has a Sinhalese majority (90.5%)

Ethnicity in Mirigama
1. Sinhalese (94.7%)
2. Moor (4.50%)
3. Other (0.80%)

=== Religion ===
The Mirigama Polling Division has a Buddhist majority (93.5%) . In comparison, the Gampaha Electoral District (which contains the Mirigama Polling Division) has a Buddhist majority (71.3%) and a significant Roman Catholic population (19.5%)

Religion in Mirigama
1. Buddhist (93.5%)
2. Muslim (4.70%)
3. Roman Catholic (1.10%)
4. Other (0.70%)
