= Wattala Divisional Secretariat =

Wattala Divisional Secretariat Sinhala: වත්තල ප්‍රාදේශීය ලේකම් කාර්‍යාලය
- Divisional Secretariat
- Interactive map of Wattala Divisional Secretariat
- Country: Sri Lanka
- Province: Western Province
- District: Gampaha District
- Time zone: UTC+5:30 (Sri Lanka Standard Time)

Wattala Divisional Secretariat is a Divisional Secretariat of Gampaha District, of Western Province, Sri Lanka.

It is a thriving city with major infrastructure facilities available. Important landmarks in Wattala include St. Sebastian's Church, Enderamulla, St. Anne's Church, Wattala, Hendala Purana Raja Maha Viharaya and Sri Sivasubranya Swamy Temple, Hekitta.

Wattala also hosts popular schools such as St. Anne's Balika Maha Vidyalaya, Wattala, St. Joseph's College, Wattala, St. Sebastian's Maha Vidyalaya, Enderamulla, Lyceum International School, OKI International School and St. Anthony's College, Wattala.

== Demography ==
Religion in Wattala DS Division (2012)
1. Buddhist (29.9%)
2. Hindu (13.0%)
3. Muslim (6.50%)
4. Roman Catholic (45.2%)
5. Other Christian (5.40%)
6. Other (0.10%)
