= Minuwangoda Divisional Secretariat =

Administrative division of Western Province, Sri Lanka

Minuwangoda මිනුවන්ගොඩ மினுவந்கொட
- Minuwangoda Divisional Secretariat
- Location in Sri Lanka
- Coordinates: 7°10′24″N 79°57′43″E
- Country: Sri Lanka
- Province: Western Province
- District: Gampaha District
- Elevation: 48.7 ft (14.83 m)

Population (Sinhalese 170175, Others 7145)By 2015
  - Total: 177,320
  - Density: 1,345.0/sq mi (519.31/km^{2})
- Time zone: UTC+5.30 (SLST)
- Postal code: 11550
- Area code: 011
- Website: www.minuwangoda.ds.gov.lk

Minuwangoda Divisional Secretariat is a Divisional Secretariat of Gampaha District, of Western Province, Sri Lanka.

== Grama Niladhari Divisions Of Minuwangoda ==
- 98 - Mabodale / East
- 98/1 - Mabodale / North
- 98/2 - Mabodale / South
- 98/3 - Mabodale / West
- 98/4 - Withanamulla / Ihala
- 98/5 - Withanamulla / pahala
- 99 - Naiwala / North
- 99/1 - Naiwala / West
- 99/2 - Naiwala / East
- 99/3 - Nalapaha
- 99/4 - Yatagama
- 101 - Wadumulla
- 102 - Essalla
- 102/1 - Metikotumulla
- 103 - Watinapaha North
- 103/1 - Watinapaha/South
- 103/2 - Wankepumulla
- 103/3 - Kamaragoda
- 105 - Horampella/South
- 105/1 - Horampella/North
- 105/2 - Mahagama
- 105/3 - Arangawa
- 105/4 - Galkanda
- 105/5 - Bodhipihituwala
- 105/6 - Kudagoda
- 106 - Dewalapola
- 107 - Ganihimulla
- 107/1 - Peralanda
- 108 - Pethiyagoda North
- 108/1 - Pethiyagoda South
- 109 - Gallegedara
- 110 - Doranagoda/North
- 110/1 - Doranagoda/East
- 110/2 - Doranagoda/West
- 110/3 - Doranagoda/South
- 111 - Korase
- 111/1 - Korase/Central
- 111/2 - Korase /East
- 112 - Medemulla South
- 112/1 - Nilpanagoda
- 112/2 - Nilpanagoda/East
- 112/3 - Medemulla/North
- 112/4 - Nilpanagoda/west
- 113 - Wegowwa/South
- 113/1 - Wegowwa East
- 114 - Kalawana
- 115 - Helakandana
- 116 - Mathammana
- 117 - Welhena
- 117/1 - Weliya
- 117/2 - Ellangala
- 118 - Paththaduwana
- 118/1 - Paththaduwana West
- 118/2 - Paththaduwana
- 119 - Kotugoda
- 119/1 - Kotugoda no2
- 119/2 - Yagodamulla
- 119/3 - Yagodamulla North
- 119/4 - Yagodamulla South
- 119/5 - Opatha
- 119/6 - Samurdhigama
- 120 - Polwatta East
- 120/1 - Polwatta West
- 121 - Galloluwa
- 121/1 - Galloluwa East
- 122 - Unnaruwa
- 122/1 - Kalahugoda
- 123 - Yatiyana
- 123/1 - Peellawatta
- 123/2 - Kopiwatta
- 123/3 - Yatiyana East
- 123/4 - Yatiyana Central
- 124 - Boragodawatta North
- 124/1 - Boragodawatta South
- 125 - Minuwangoda Central
- 125/1 - Minuwangoda West
- 125/2 - Minuwangoda North
- 125/3 - Minuwangoda East
- 126 - Wattegedara
- 126/1 - Pansilgoda
- 126/2 - Burullapitiya
- 126/3 - Ambagahawatta
- 127 - Balabowa
- 128 - Wigoda
- 129 - Marapola
- 130 - Weediyawatta East
- 130/1 - Weediyawatta West
- 131 - Pahala Udugampola North
- 131/1 - Pahala Udugampola East
- 131/2 - Pahala Udugampola South
- 131/3 - Pahala Udugampola West
- 131/4 - Ihala Udugampola
- 131/5 - Goigama
- 132 - Dombawala
- 133 - Wathumulla
- 133/1 - Pedipola
- 134 - Asgiriya
- 134/1 - Asgiriya North
- 134/2 - Asgiriya South
- 134/3 - Asgiriya West
- 135 - Asgiriwalpola North
- 135/1 - Asgiriwalpola South
- 135/2 - Asgiriwalpola West
- 136 - Thammita
- 136/1 - Thammita West
- 137 - Madelgamuwa East
- 137/1 - Madelgamuwa West
- 137/2 - Batapotha
- 138 - Siyambalapitiya
- 138/1 - Maduruwita
- 139 - Nedagamuwa South
- 139/1 - Nedagamuwa North
- 139/2 - Nedagamuwa West
- 140 - Kehelbaddara East
- 140/1 - Kehelbaddara West
- 140/2 - Uggalboda
- 140/3 - Uggalboda West
- 141 - Hendimahara

== Census ==
=== Census Of Population By Ethnicity. ===
Ethnicity	Value
Sinhalese	170175
Sri Lankan Tamil	826
Indian Tamil	2094
Sri Lankan Moor	3700
Burgher	240
Malay	207
Sri Lankan Chetty	11
Other	67
Total	177320

As a percentage.
1. Sinhalese (95.2%)
2. Sri Lankan Tamil (0.40%)
3. Indian Tamil (1.09%)
4. Sri Lankan Moor (2.10%)
5. Burgher (0.10%)
6. Malay (0.10%)
7. Sri Lankan Chetty (0.01%)
8. Other (1.00%)

=== Census Of Population By Religion. ===
Religion	Value
Buddhist	157807
Hindu	608
Roman Catholic	10844
Christian	1911
Islamic	6090
Other	60
Total	177320

As a percentage.
1. Buddhist (89.0%)
2. Hindu (0.34%)
3. Roman Catholic (6.10%)
4. Christian (1.10%)
5. Islamic (3.43%)
6. Other (0.03%)

=== Census Of Population By Gender. ===
Gender	Value
Male	92064
Female	85256
Total	177320

As a percentage.
1. Male (51.9%)
2. Female (48.1%)
