= Attanagalla Divisional Secretariat =

- Divisional Secretariat
- Location in Sri Lanka
- Coordinates: 7°07′12″N 80°06′01″E
- Country: Sri Lanka
- Province: Western Province
- District: Gampaha
- Established: 1972

Government
  - Type: Divisional Secretary's Division
  - Divisional Secretary: D. M. Rathnayake

Population
  - Total: 178,816
  - Density: 1,200/km^{2} (3,100/sq mi)
- Time zone: UTC+5:30 (Sri Lanka Standard Time)
- Website: http://www.attanagalla.ds.gov.lk/

Attanagalla Divisional Secretariat is a Divisional Secretariat of Gampaha District, of Western Province, Sri Lanka.The duties possessed by " Rate Mahattaya " have been entrusted with Divisional Revenues Officers in 1950 In forming Divisional Assistant Government Agent Attanagalla has become a Divisional Secretariat in 1972 which covers Attanagalla Electorate.

== Administrative units ==
Attanagalla Divisional Secretariat which had possessed 86 Gama Niladhari Divisional at the beginning is now consisted of 151 Grama Niladhari Divisions(GN Divisions) which is the highest number of GN divisions located in a Divisional secretariat in Sri Lanka for the time being.

== Population ==
DS Division	Main Town	Divisional Secretary	GN Divisions	Area (km^{2})	Population (2012 Census)						Population Density (/km^{2})
DS Division	Main Town	Divisional Secretary	GN Divisions	Area (km^{2})	Sinhalese	Sri Lankan Moors	Sri Lankan Tamil	Malays	Other	Total	Population Density (/km^{2})
Attanagalla	Attanagalla	D. M. Rathnayake	151	149	154,969	21,389	927	657	874	178,816	1,200

=== Demography ===
Religion in Attanagalla DS Division (2012)
1. Buddhist (84.5%)
2. Hindu (0.60%)
3. Muslim (12.4%)
4. Roman Catholic (2.10%)
5. Other Christian (0.40%)
6. Other (0.00%)
