= Katana Divisional Secretariat =

- Divisional Secretariat
- Interactive map of Katana Divisional Secretariat
- Country: Sri Lanka
- Province: Western Province
- District: Gampaha District
- Time zone: UTC+5:30 (Sri Lanka Standard Time)

Katana Divisional Secretariat is a Divisional Secretariat of Gampaha District, of Western Province, Sri Lanka. Andiambalama, Kimbulapitiya, and Kowinna are notable municipalities within this divisional secretariat.

== Demography ==
Religion in Katana DS Division (2012)
1. Buddhist (60.1%)
2. Hindu (1.70%)
3. Muslim (2.00%)
4. Roman Catholic (32.0%)
5. Other Christian (4.10%)
6. Other (0.10%)
