= Gampaha Divisional Secretariat =

- Divisional Secretariat
- Location within Sri Lanka
- Country: Sri Lanka
- Province: Western Province
- District: Gampaha District
- Time zone: UTC+5:30 (SLST)
- Website: www.gampaha.ds.gov.lk

Gampaha Divisional Secretariat is a Divisional Secretariat of Gampaha District, of Western Province, Sri Lanka.

== Demography ==
Religion in Gampaha DS Division (2012)
1. Buddhist (87.6%)
2. Hindu (0.40%)
3. Muslim (0.20%)
4. Roman Catholic (10.7%)
5. Other Christian (1.10%)
6. Other (0.00%)

== See also ==
- Minuwangoda Divisional Secretariat
