= Mahara Divisional Secretariat =

- Divisional Secretariat
- Interactive map of Mahara Divisional Secretariat
- Country: Sri Lanka
- Province: Western Province
- District: Gampaha District
- Time zone: UTC+5:30 (Sri Lanka Standard Time)

Mahara Divisional Secretariat is a Divisional Secretariat of Gampaha District, of Western Province, Sri Lanka.

== Demography ==
Religion in Mahara DS Division (2012)
1. Buddhist (84.9%)
2. Hindu (0.60%)
3. Muslim (4.50%)
4. Roman Catholic (8.80%)
5. Other Christian (1.20%)
6. Other (0.00%)
