= Maligatenna Raja Maha Vihara =

Ancient Cave temple in Gampaha District, Sri Lanka

- මාලිගාතැන්න රජ මහා විහාරය
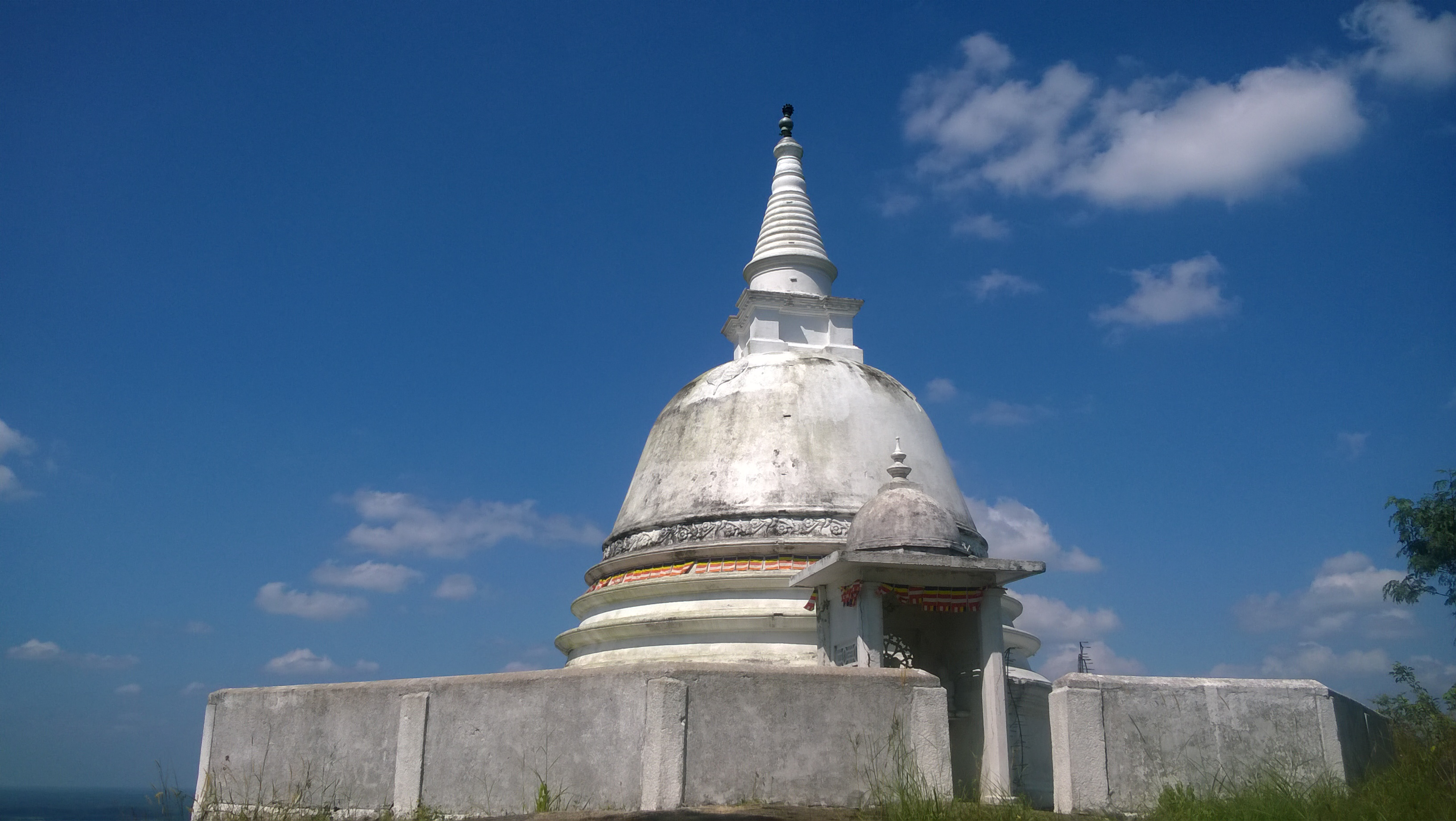

Religion
- Affiliation: Buddhism
- District: Gampaha
- Province: Western Province

Location
- Location: Maligatenna, Sri Lanka
- Interactive map of Maligatenna Raja Maha Vihara
- Coordinates: 07°04′00.7″N 80°03′52.0″E

Architecture
- Type: Buddhist Temple
- Style: Cave temple

Maligatenna Raja Maha Vihara (Sinhala: මාලිගාතැන්න රජ මහා විහාරය/මාලිගාතැන්න ආරණ්‍ය සේනාසනය) is an ancient Cave temple located in Malwatuhiripitiya village, Gampaha District, Sri Lanka. The temple is located on the Gampaha-Wathurugama Road and approximately 1.6 km (0.99 mi) away from the ancient temple Pilikuththuwa Raja Maha Vihara.

Currently this temple has been recognized as an archaeological protected site in Gampaha District by Archaeological department.

== History ==
The history of Maligathenna Raja Maha Vihara goes back to the period of Anuradhapura Kingdom. According to Brahmi inscriptions found in nearby Warana Raja Maha Vihara and Pilikutthuwa Raja Maha Vihara, it has been assumed that this place also existed as a major cave site during the early part of the Anuradhapura period.

=== folklores ===
Two folklore describe how this temple became an important place for kings and their ministers during the enemy invasion periods. According to the first folklore, this temple is considered as one of the places that King Valagamba used to hide during the Chola invasions in Anuradhapura. As the other folklore, this vihara was the first place where the tooth relic of Buddha was hidden for safety (before being carried to Delgamuwa Raja Maha Vihara) when King Don Juan Dharmapala of Kotte kingdom embraced Christianity during the Portuguese period.

== Structures ==
The temple has been mainly divided into two grounds called Pahala Maluwa and Ihala Maluwa. In the pahala maluwa an image house, a Bo tree, an ancient Devalaya and Stupa can be seen. On the top of the rock, a rampart surrounded by the Bo tree and a Stupa has been built. There are several rock caves with drip ledges found in the vihara premises. In one of them, an engraved stone door frame can be seen. According to the view of professor Senarath Paranavithana that door frame may belongs to the period of 8th century of A.D.

== See also ==
- List of Archaeological Protected Monuments in Gampaha District
