= Thihariya =

- Town
- Location within Sri Lanka
- Coordinates: 7°12′0″N 80°07′0″E
- Country: Sri Lanka
- Province: Western
- District: Gampaha
- DS Division: Thihariya Town

Thihariya is a small town in Gampaha District, Western province, Sri Lanka. It is located nearly 9 km away from Gampaha town. Thihariya is in between Nittambuwa and Kalagedihena.
