= Negombo Divisional Secretariat =

- Divisional Secretariat
- Interactive map of Negombo Divisional Secretariat
- Country: Sri Lanka
- Province: Western Province
- Time zone: UTC+5:30 (Sri Lanka Standard Time)

Negombo Divisional Secretariat is a Divisional Secretariat of Western Province, Sri Lanka.

== Demography ==
Religion in Negombo DS Division (2012)
1. Buddhist (11.1%)
2. Hindu (5.90%)
3. Muslim (14.3%)
4. Roman Catholic (65.3%)
5. Other Christian (3.30%)
6. Other (0.10%)
