= Ja-Ela Divisional Secretariat =

Coordinates: 7°04′34″N 79°54′15″E

- Divisional Secretariat
- Interactive map of Ja-Ela Divisional Secretariat
- Country: Sri Lanka
- Province: Western Province
- District: Gampaha District
- Time zone: UTC+5:30 (Sri Lanka Standard Time)
- Post code: 11350
- Area code: 0112

Ja-Ela Divisional Secretariat is a Divisional Secretariat of Gampaha District, of Western Province, Sri Lanka.

== Demography ==
Religion in Ja-Ela DS Division (2012)
1. Buddhist (43.6%)
2. Hindu (2.10%)
3. Muslim (1.10%)
4. Roman Catholic (49.4%)
5. Other Christian (3.80%)
6. Other (0.10%)
