= Mirigama Divisional Secretariat =

- Divisional Secretariat
- Interactive map of Mirigama Divisional Secretariat
- Coordinates: 7.24066°N 80.12754°E
- Country: Sri Lanka
- Province: Western Province
- District: Gampaha District

Area
  - Total: 71 sq mi (183 km^{2})

Population
  - Total: 164,166
  - Density: 2,320/sq mi (897/km^{2})
- Time zone: UTC+5:30 (Sri Lanka Standard Time)
- Area code: 033
- Website: www.mirigama.ds.gov.lk

Mirigama Divisional Secretariat is a Divisional Secretariat of Gampaha District, of Western Province, Sri Lanka.

== Demography ==
Religion in Mirigama DS Division (2012)
1. Buddhist (93.5%)
2. Hindu (0.40%)
3. Muslim (4.70%)
4. Roman Catholic (1.10%)
5. Other Christian (0.30%)
6. Other (0.00%)
