= Kelaniya Divisional Secretariat =

- Divisional Secretariat
- Interactive map of Kelaniya Divisional Secretariat
- Country: Sri Lanka
- Province: Western Province
- District: Gampaha District
- Time zone: UTC+5:30 (Sri Lanka Standard Time)

Kelaniya Divisional Secretariat is a Divisional Secretariat of Gampaha District, of Western Province, Sri Lanka.

== Demography ==
Religion in Kelaniya DS Division (2012)
1. Buddhist (74.7%)
2. Hindu (4.70%)
3. Muslim (9.10%)
4. Roman Catholic (9.80%)
5. Other Christian (1.70%)
6. Other (0.00%)
