= Divulapitiya Divisional Secretariat =

- Divisional Secretariat
- Interactive map of Divulapitiya Divisional Secretariat
- Country: Sri Lanka
- Province: Western Province
- District: Gampaha District
- Time zone: UTC+5:30 (Sri Lanka Standard Time)
- Website: www.divulapitiya.ds.gov.lk

Divulapitiya Divisional Secretariat is a Divisional Secretariat of Gampaha District, of Western Province, Sri Lanka.

== Demography ==
Religion in Divulapitiya DS Division (2012)
1. Buddhist (85.1%)
2. Hindu (0.40%)
3. Muslim (0.10%)
4. Roman Catholic (13.4%)
5. Other Christian (1.00%)
6. Other (0.00%)
