= Ambagamuwa Divisional Secretariat =

- Divisional Secretariat
- Interactive map of Ambagamuwa Divisional Secretariat
- Coordinates: 6°52′17″N 80°33′30″E
- Country: Sri Lanka
- Province: Central Province
- District: Nuwara Eliya District
- Time zone: UTC+5:30 (Sri Lanka Standard Time)

Ambagamuwa Divisional Secretariat is a Divisional Secretariat of Nuwara Eliya District, of Central Province, Sri Lanka.

== Demography-Religion ==
Religion in Ambagamuwa DS Division (2012)
1. Buddhist (21.4%)
2. Hindu (66.6%)
3. Muslim (2.90%)
4. Roman Catholic (6.30%)
5. Other Christian (2.80%)
6. Other (0.00%)
