= Minuwangoda =

Minuwangoda මිනුවන්ගොඩ மினுவந்கொட
- Divisional secretariat
- Location in Sri Lanka
- Coordinates: 7°10′24″N 79°57′43″E
- Country: Sri Lanka
- Province: Western
- District: Gampaha

Area
  - Total: 132.7 km^{2} (51.2 sq mi)

Population (2024)
  - Total: 198,774
- Time zone: UTC+5.30 (SLST)
- Postal code: 11550
- Area code: 011
- Website: www.minuwangoda.ds.gov.lk

Minuwangoda (Sinhala: මිනුවන්ගොඩ, Tamil: மினுவந்கொட) is a town and divisional secretariat in Gampaha District, Western Province, Sri Lanka. read over an area of 132.7 km^{2} (51.2 sq mi), it had a population of 198,774 in 2024.

== Geography and administration ==
Minuwangoda is a town and divisional secretariat in Gampaha District, Western Province, Sri Lanka. The divisional secretariat is spread over an area of 132.7 km^{2} (51.2 sq mi). Minuwangoda town is located about 35 km (22 mi) northeast of Colombo and 15 km (9.3 mi) from Negombo. The Minuwangoda divisional secretariat is bound to the north by the roads connecting Minuwangoda with Negombo and Divulapitiya roads, and the roads connecting Minuwangoda with Gampaha and Colombo along the villages of Ellangala and Polwatta to the south. Its eastern boundary is defined by Minuwangoda Oya and sections of the roads connecting Minuwangoda with Divulapitiya, Veyangoda, and Gampaha, and the western boundary consists of a section of the Oya, and the roads connecting Minuwangoda with Negombo and Colombo. Minuwangoda hosts an industrial zone spread across 15 acres (6.1 ha).

== Demographics ==
According to the 2024 census, Minuwangoda Divisional Secretariat Division had a population of 198,774 inhabitants, comprising 95,427 males and 103,347 females. About 36,601 (18.4%) of the population were below the age of six years, while 26,432 (13.3%) were aged 65 and above. The population was predominantly rural, with 191,623 residents (96.4%) classified as rural and 7,151 (3.6%) as urban.

Majority of the population was Sinhalese (95.7%) followed by Sri Lankan Moors (3.4%), Sri Lankan Tamils (0.6%), Indian Tamils (0.1%) and other ethnic groups (0.2%). Buddhism was the major religion with 88.9% adherents, followed by Christianity (7.1%), Islam (3.5%), Hinduism (0.4%) and others (0.1%).
