= Divulapitiya =

Divulapitiya දිවුලපිටිය திவுலபிடிய
- Town
- Location within Sri Lanka
- Coordinates: 7°13′0″N 80°0′56″E
- Country: Sri Lanka
- District: Gampaha District
- Time zone: UTC+5:30 (SLST)
- Postal code: 11250
- Area code: 031
- Website: www.divulapitiya.ds.gov.lk

Divulapitiya (Sinhala: දිවුලපිටිය, Tamil: திவுலபிடிய) is a town in Gampaha District, Western Province, Sri Lanka. It is located about 19 km (12 mi) away from Negombo.

== Education ==
There are a number of Schools in Divulapitiya.

- Divulapitiya Sri Gnanodaya Central College.
- Hunumulla Central College.
- Divulapitiya Ghanawasa College.
- Aluthepola Walagamba Maha Vidyalaya.

== Tourist attractions ==
- Balagalla Saraswathi Pirivena, is an ancient Vihara and Buddhist educational centre located in Divulapitiya. The pirivena was established on 7 March 1903 and currently it has been protected as one of archaeological protected monument in Sri Lanka.
- Balagalla Walawwa, is an archaeologically protected Walawwa in Divulapitiya and it's also the home of late Minister Lakshman Jayakody.

== Climate ==
The climate in Divulapitiya is classified as Af by the Köppen climate classification. The annual rain fall is about 2540 mm and the average temperature is about 27.0 °C. April is the warmest month with temperature averages 28.0 °C.

Climate data for Divulapitiya
Month	Jan	Feb	Mar	Apr	May	Jun	Jul	Aug	Sep	Oct	Nov	Dec	Year
Mean daily maximum °C (°F)	30.4 (86.7)	30.7 (87.3)	31.4 (88.5)	31.9 (89.4)	30.8 (87.4)	29.9 (85.8)	29.7 (85.5)	29.8 (85.6)	29.9 (85.8)	29.6 (85.3)	30 (86)	30 (86)	30.3 (86.5)
Daily mean °C (°F)	26.1 (79.0)	26.3 (79.3)	27.2 (81.0)	28 (82)	27.9 (82.2)	27.3 (81.1)	27.2 (81.0)	27.4 (81.3)	27.1 (80.8)	26.6 (79.9)	26.4 (79.5)	26.2 (79.2)	26.9 (80.4)
Mean daily minimum °C (°F)	21.8 (71.2)	22 (72)	23.1 (73.6)	24.1 (75.4)	25 (77)	24.8 (76.6)	24.7 (76.5)	25 (77)	24.3 (75.7)	23.6 (74.5)	22.8 (73.0)	22.4 (72.3)	23.6 (74.5)
Average precipitation mm (inches)	79 (3.1)	82 (3.2)	144 (5.7)	266 (10.5)	376 (14.8)	214 (8.4)	150 (5.9)	119 (4.7)	224 (8.8)	377 (14.8)	333 (13.1)	176 (6.9)	2,540 (99.9)
Average precipitation days	7	4	8	14	16	14	11	9	13	19	16	10	141
Source: climate-data.org,
