= Gampaha District =

Gampaha District ගම්පහ දිස්ත්‍රික්කය கம்பஹா மாவட்டம்
- Administrative District
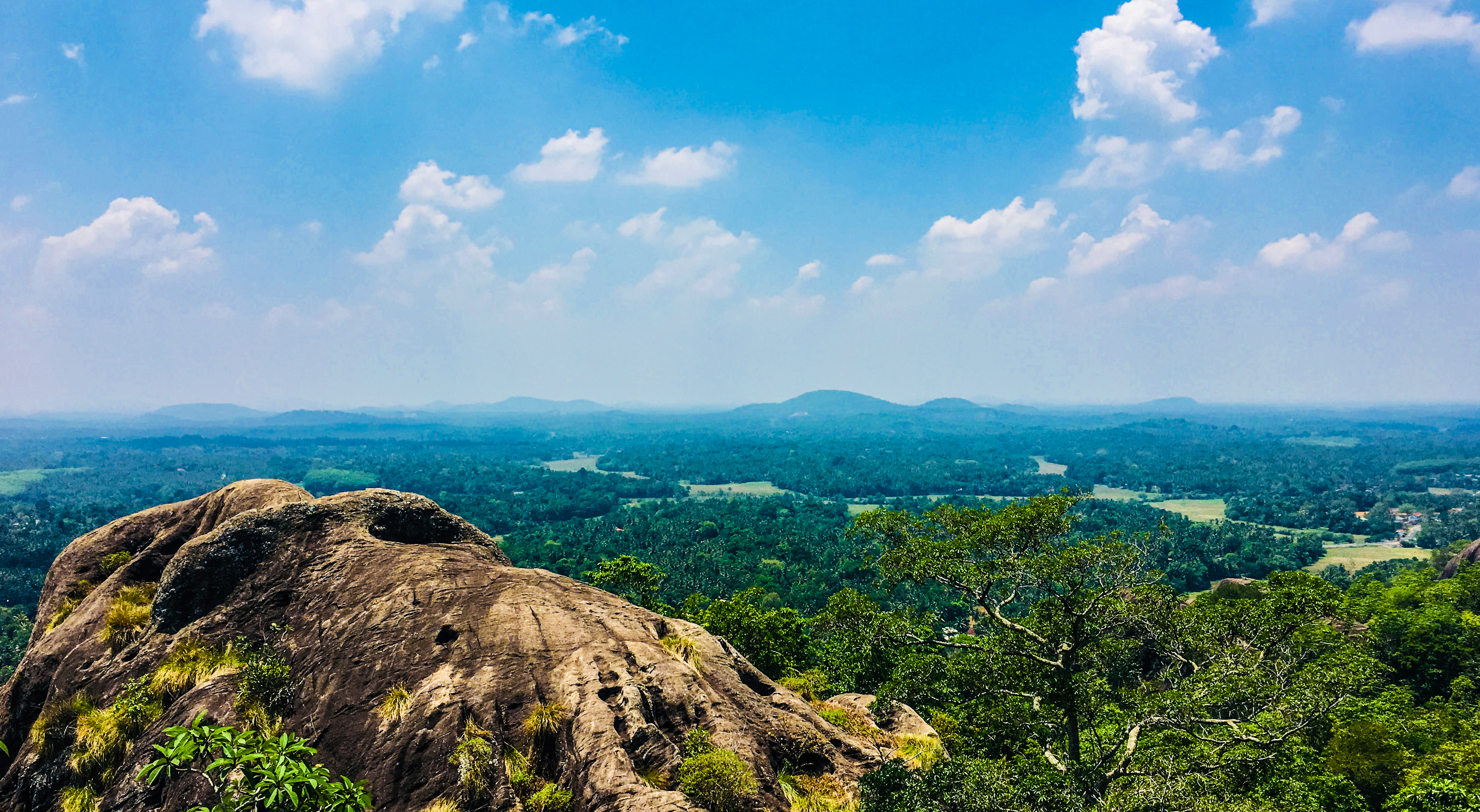

- Location within Sri Lanka
- Coordinates: 07°08′N 80°00′E
- Country: Sri Lanka
- Province: Western
- Created: September 1978
- Capital: Gampaha
- DS Division: List: Attanagalla; Biyagama; Divulapitiya; Dompe; Gampaha; Ja-Ela; Katana; Kelaniya; Mahara; Minuwangoda; Mirigama; Negombo; Wattala

Government
  - District Secretary: Lalinda Gamage

Area
  - Total: 1,387 km^{2} (536 sq mi)
  - Land: 1,341 km^{2} (518 sq mi)
  - Water: 46 km^{2} (18 sq mi) 3.32%
  - Rank: 21st (2.11% of total area)

Population (2021 census)
  - Total: 2,443,000
  - Rank: 2nd (11.32% of total pop.)
  - Density: 1,822/km^{2} (4,718/sq mi)

Ethnicity (2012 census)
  - Sinhalese: 2,079,115 (90.61%)
  - Sri Lankan Moors: 95,501 (4.16%)
  - Sri Lankan Tamil: 80,071 (3.49%)
  - Malays: 11,658 (0.51%)
  - Other: 28,296 (1.23%)

Religion (2012 census)
  - Buddhist: 1,640,166 (71.48%)
  - Christian: 486,173 (21.19%)
  - Muslim: 114,851 (5.01%)
  - Hindu: 52,221 (2.28%)
  - Other: 1,230 (0.05%)
- Time zone: UTC+05:30 (Sri Lanka)
- Post Codes: 11000-11999
- Telephone Codes: 011, 031, 033
- ISO 3166 code: LK-12
- Vehicle registration: WP
- Official Languages: Sinhala, Tamil
- Website: Gampaha District Secretariat

Gampaha District (Sinhala: ගම්පහ දිස්ත්‍රික්කය gampaha distrikkaya, Tamil: கம்பஹா மாவட்டம் Kampakai Māvaṭṭam) is one of the 25 districts of Sri Lanka, the second level administrative division of the country. It is the most populous district of Sri Lanka. The district is administered by a District Secretariat headed by a District Secretary (previously known as a Government Agent) appointed by the central government of Sri Lanka. The capital of the district is the town of Gampaha. The district was carved out of the northern part of Colombo District in September 1978.

== Geographical Nature ==
Gampaha District is located in the west of Sri Lanka and has an area of 1,387 square kilometres (536 sq mi). It is bounded by Kurunegala and Puttalam districts from north, Kegalle District from east, Colombo District from south and by the Indian Ocean from west. The borders of the district are the Ma Oya on the north, Kelani River on the south and 1,000 ft contour line on the east.

== Administrative units ==
Gampaha District is divided into 13 Divisional Secretary's Division (DS Divisions), each headed by a Divisional Secretary (previously known as an Assistant Government Agent). The DS Divisions are further sub-divided into 1,177 Grama Niladhari Divisions (GN Divisions).

Economy

The economy of Gampaha District is multi-faceted:

1. Industry and Manufacturing Free Trade Zones are located in areas such as Katunayake and Biyagama, and industries such as clothing, electronics, and food processing are widely operated. These contribute greatly to foreign income.

2. Trade and Services Trade is very active in cities such as Gampaha and Negombo. Supermarkets, banks, hotels, and small businesses are abundant.

3. Agriculture Agriculture is also important in Gampaha District.

Coconuts Rice Vegetables and fruits Especially the coconut industry (areas belonging to the Coconut Triangle) contribute to the economy here.

4. Aviation and Tourism The aviation and logistics industry is very important due to the location of Bandaranaike International Airport.

The Negombo beach area is popular with tourists.

Transport

Gampaha District has a well-developed transport network: The highest number of expressway entrances in Sri Lanka are located in Gampaha District.

1. Road Network

Colombo–Katunayake Expressway (E03) – connects Colombo to the airport

Central Expressway (E04 – under construction/partially operational)

Major roads such as A1, A3

These act as the primary backbone for the country's transport.

2. Rail Service

The Main Line from Colombo Fort via Ragama, Gampaha

Coastal/airport connections near Negombo and Katunayake

The rail line is very important for daily commuters.

3. Air Transport

Bandaranaike International Airport is the main international airport in Sri Lanka,

and plays a major role in the transport of import/export tourists and business travelers.

4. Bus and Public Transport SLTB and private bus services are spread throughout the Gampaha district.

DS Division	Main Town	Divisional Secretary	GN Divisions	Area (km^{2})	Population (2012 Census)						Population Density (/km^{2})
DS Division	Main Town	Divisional Secretary	GN Divisions	Area (km^{2})	Sinhalese	Sri Lankan Moors	Sri Lankan Tamil	Malays	Other	Total	Population Density (/km^{2})
Attanagalla	Nittambuwa	D. M. Rathnayake	151	149	154,969	21,389	927	657	874	178,816	1,200
Biyagama	Biyagama	T. D. S. P. Perera	49	59	171,454	12,133	1,622	677	976	186,862	3,167
Divulapitiya	Divulapitiya	H. M. L. S. Herath	123	202	142,420	80	1,003	34	334	143,871	712
Dompe	Kiridiwela	H. G. J. P. Wijesiriwardhna	133	176	150,016	2,282	443	52	344	153,137	870
Gampaha	Gampaha	C. P. W. Gunathilaka	101	96	194,292	359	942	119	733	196,445	2,046
Ja-Ela	Ja-Ela	Nimali De Silva	57	60	186,201	962	7,778	1,232	4,981	201,154	3,353
Katana	Katana	K. G. H. H. R. Kiriella	79	116	214,207	3,361	9,878	1,020	5,388	233,854	2,016
Kelaniya	Kelaniya	W. H. V. Pushpamala	37	20	113,133	8,588	7,834	2,674	2,464	134,693	6,735
Mahara	Mahara	Thamara D. Perera	92	94	194,637	5,488	2,326	3,548	1,231	207,230	2,205
Minuwangoda	Minuwangoda	C. P. W. Gunathilake	121	128	171,254	5,633	827	243	444	178,401	1,394
Mirigama	Mirigama	Y. I. M. Silva	149	183	155,469	5,592	885	99	2,121	164,166	897
Negombo	Negombo	A. K. R. Alawaththa	39	50	107,155	19,364	12,590	278	2,289	141,676	2,834
Wattala	Wattala	Chandima Dissanayake	46	54	123,908	10,270	33,016	1,025	6,117	174,336	3,228
Total			1,177	1,387	2,079,115	95,501	80,071	11,658	28,296	2,294,641	1,654

== Demographics ==
=== Population ===
Gampaha District's population was 2,294,641 in 2012. The majority of the population are Sinhalese, with a minority Sri Lankan Moor and Sri Lankan Tamil population.

=== Ethnicity ===
Ethnicity in Gampaha District (2024)
1. Sinhala (89.8%)
2. Sri Lankan Moors (5.05%)
3. Sri Lankan Tamils (4.02%)
4. Others (1.09%)

Population of Gampaha District by ethnic group 1981 to 2012
Year	Sinhalese		Sri Lankan Moors		Sri Lankan Tamil		Malays		Other		Total No.
Year	No.	%	No.	%	No.	%	No.	%	No.	%	Total No.
1981 Census	1,279,512	91.99%	37,826	2.72%	48,182	3.46%	8,675	0.62%	16,667	1.20%	1,390,862
2001 Census	1,877,545	90.98%	78,705	3.81%	65,302	3.16%	13,683	0.66%	28,449	1.38%	2,063,684
2012 Census	2,079,115	90.61%	95,501	4.16%	80,071	3.49%	11,658	0.51%	28,296	1.23%	2,294,641

=== Religion ===
Religion in Gampaha district (2024)
Religion	Percent
Buddhism	71.61%
Catholicism	18.16%
Islam	5.52%
Hinduism	2.85%
Other Christianity	1.83%
Other or not stated	0.04%

Population of Gampaha District by religion 1981 to 2012
Year	Buddhist		Christian (Note: Roman Catholic and Other Christian.)		Muslim		Hindu		Other		Total No.
Year	No.	%	No.	%	No.	%	No.	%	No.	%	Total No.
1981 Census	989,212	71.12%	325,915	23.43%	48,117	3.46%	26,750	1.92%	868	0.06%	1,390,862
2001 Census	1,479,955	71.71%	446,647	21.64%	93,496	4.53%	42,356	2.05%	1,230	0.06%	2,063,684
2012 Census	1,640,166	71.48%	486,173	21.19%	114,851	5.01%	52,221	2.28%	1,230	0.05%	2,294,641
