= Galthambarawa Grama Niladhari Division =

Galthambarawa
- Grama Niladhari Division
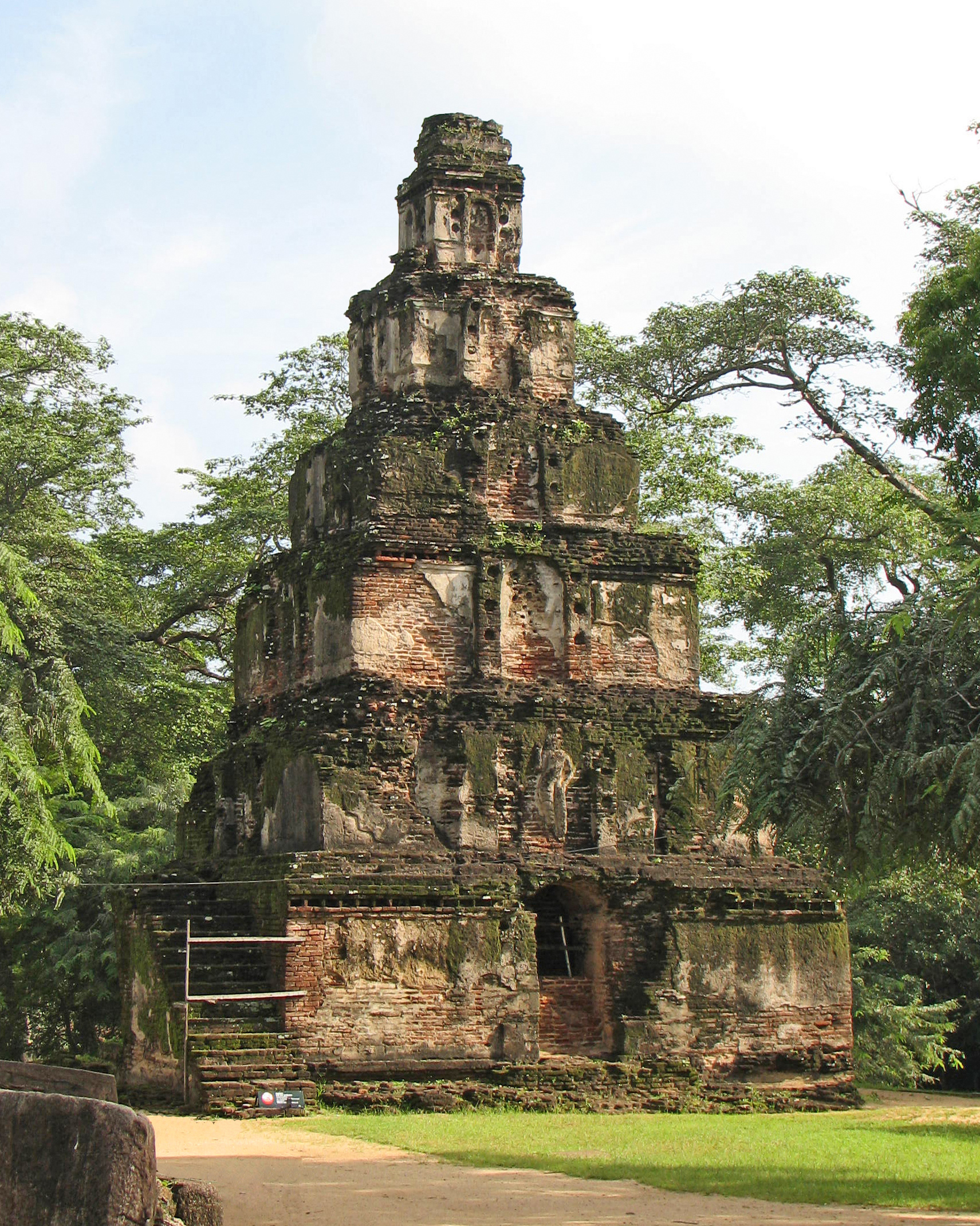
- Satmahal Prasada is located within, nearby or associated with the Galthambarawa Grama Niladhari Division
- Interactive map of Galthambarawa
- Coordinates: 7.944436°N 81.009052°E
- Country: Sri Lanka
- Province: North Central Province
- District: Polonnaruwa District
- Divisional Secretariat: Thamankaduwa Divisional Secretariat
- Electoral District: Polonnaruwa Electoral District
- Polling Division: Polonnaruwa Polling Division

Area
  - Total: 1.88 km^{2} (0.73 sq mi)
- Elevation: 63 m (207 ft)

Population (2012)
  - Total: 835
  - Density: 444/km^{2} (1,150/sq mi)
- ISO 3166 code: LK-7215140

Galthambarawa

Galthambarawa Grama Niladhari Division is a Grama Niladhari Division of the Thamankaduwa Divisional Secretariat of Polonnaruwa District of North Central Province, Sri Lanka. It has Grama Niladhari Division Code 178.

Satmahal Prasada, Hatadage, Polonnaruwa Vatadage and Nissanka Latha Mandapaya are located within, nearby or associated with Galthambarawa.

Galthambarawa is a surrounded by the Palugasdamana North, Nishshankamallapura, Palugasdamana South, Kuruppu Junction and Ethumalpitiya Grama Niladhari Divisions.

== Demographics ==
=== Ethnicity ===
The Galthambarawa Grama Niladhari Division has a Sinhalese majority (99.8%). In comparison, the Thamankaduwa Divisional Secretariat (which contains the Galthambarawa Grama Niladhari Division) has a Sinhalese majority (82.9%) and a significant Moor population (15.8%)

Ethnicity in Galthambarawa
1. Sinhalese (99.8%)
2. Other (0.20%)

=== Religion ===
The Galthambarawa Grama Niladhari Division has a Buddhist majority (98.9%). In comparison, the Thamankaduwa Divisional Secretariat (which contains the Galthambarawa Grama Niladhari Division) has a Buddhist majority (81.4%) and a significant Muslim population (16.0%)

Religion in Galthambarawa
1. Buddhist (98.9%)
2. Other (1.10%)

== Gallery ==
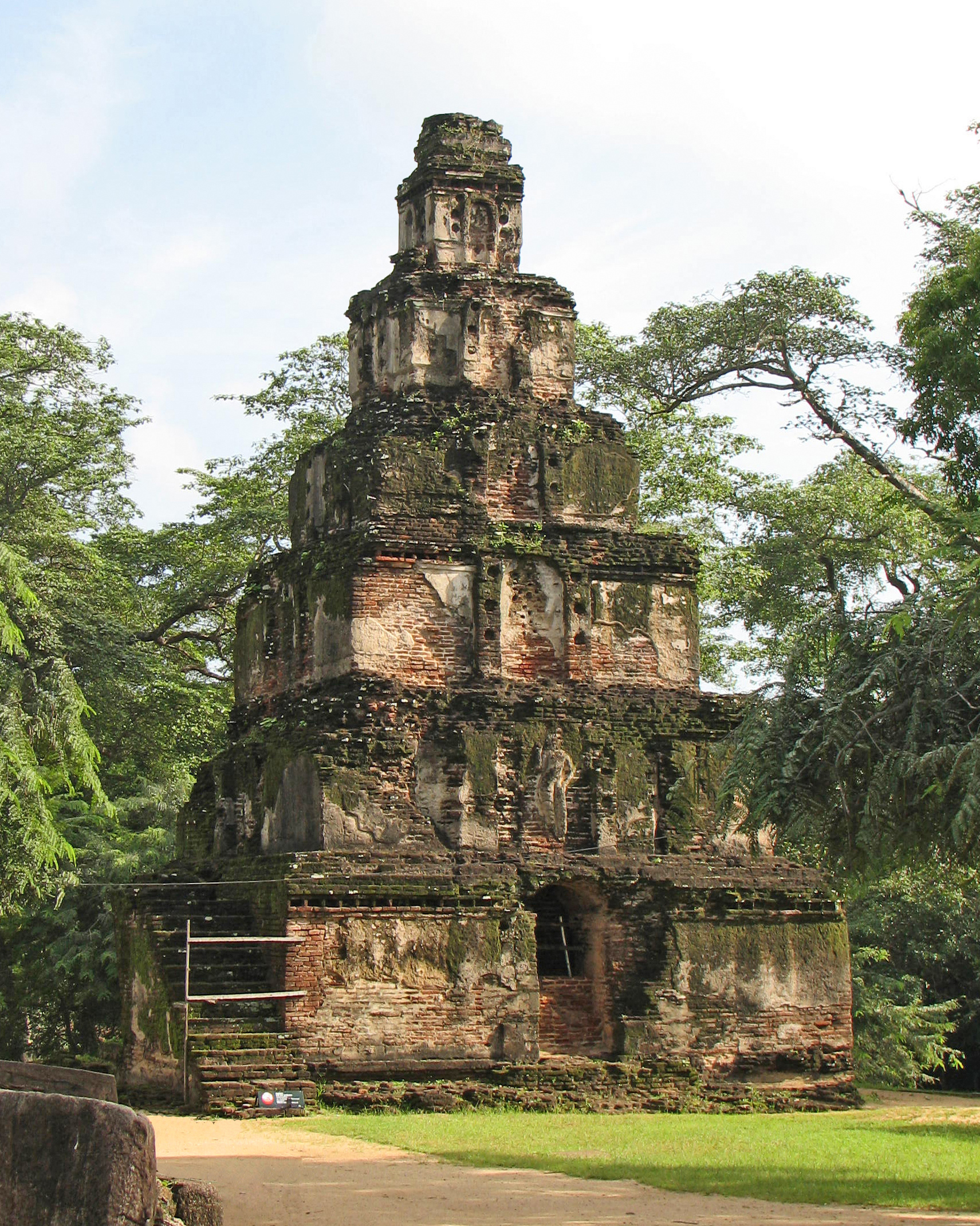
Satmahal Prasada

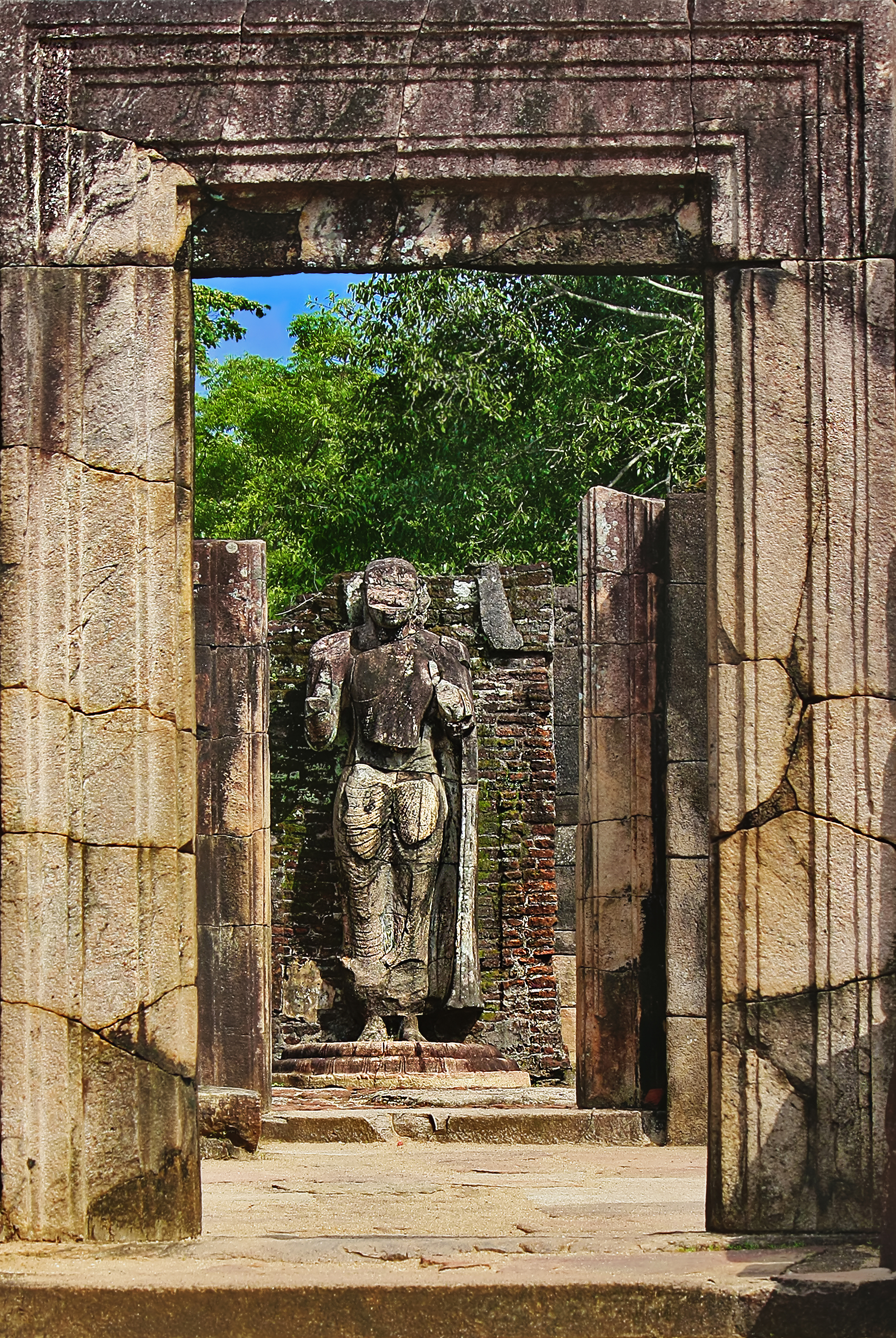
Hatadage

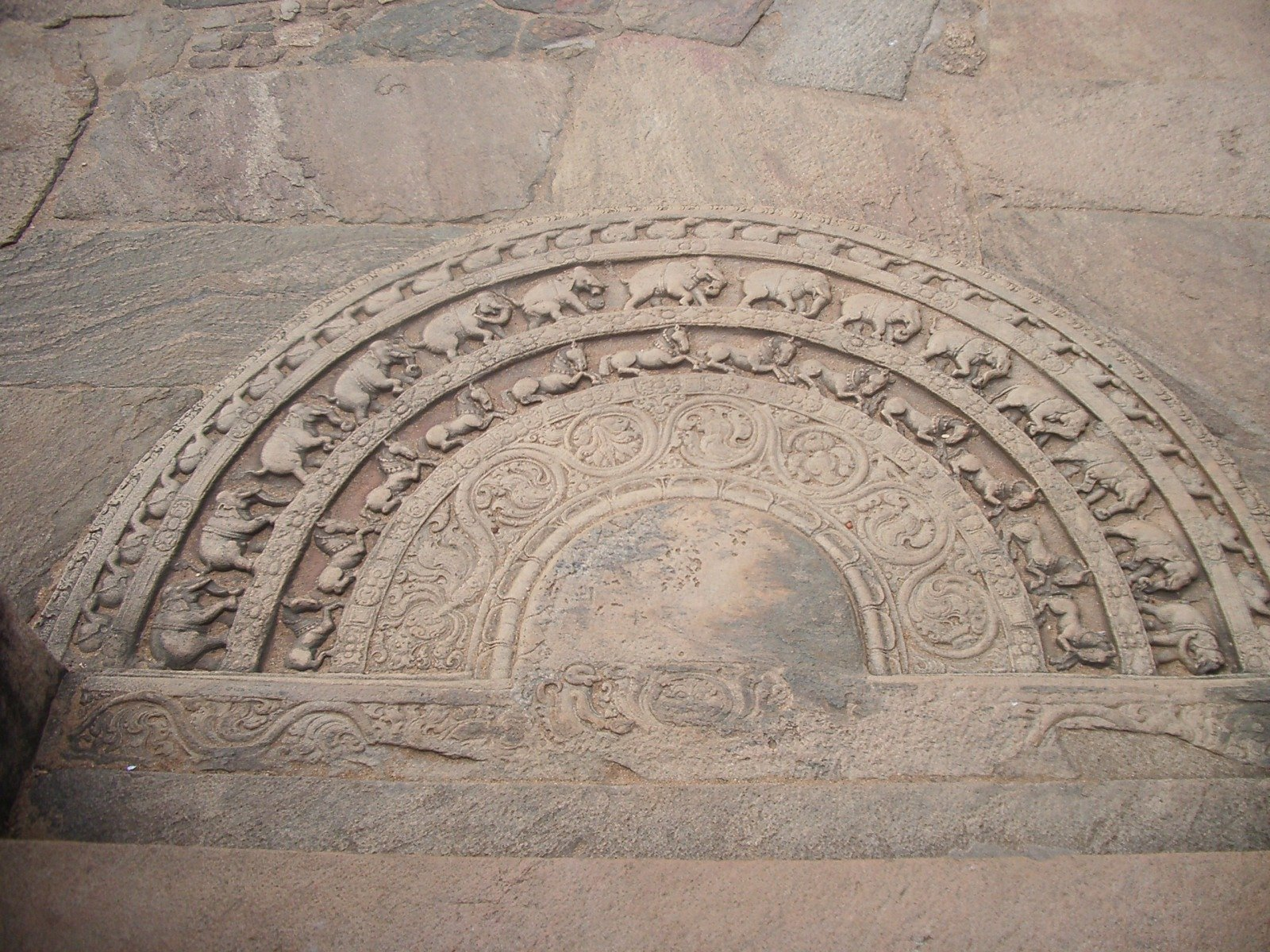
Polonnaruwa Vatadage

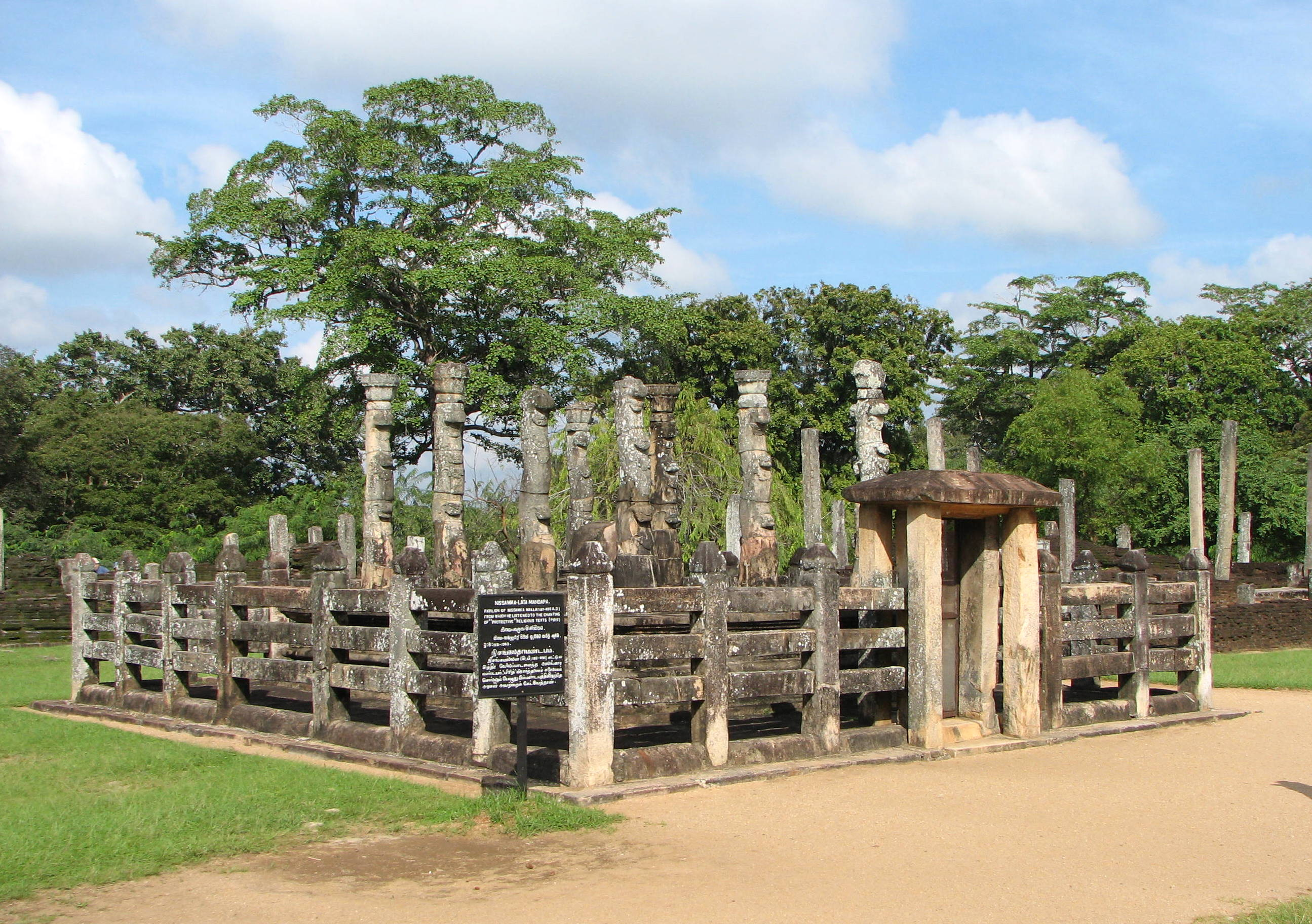
Nissanka Latha Mandapaya
