= Asgiriya Raja Maha Vihara, Gampaha =

Ancient Cave temple in Gampaha District, Sri Lanka

Asgiriya Raja Maha Vihara
- අස්ගිරිය රජ මහා විහාරය
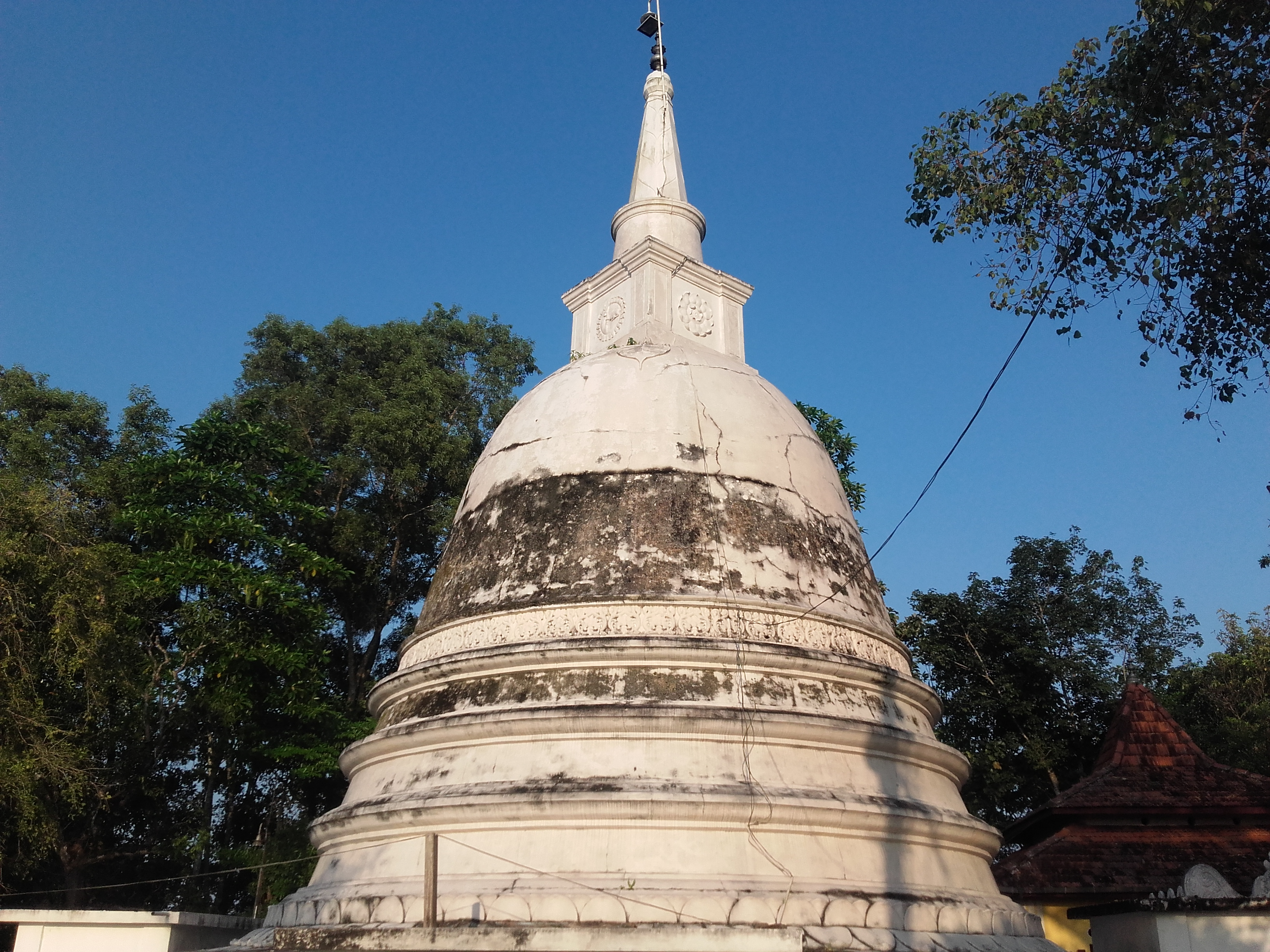

Religion
- Affiliation: Buddhism
- District: Gampaha
- Province: Western Province

Location
- Location: Asgiriya, Gampaha, Sri Lanka
- Interactive map of Asgiriya Raja Maha Vihara
- Coordinates: 07°06′39.6″N 79°59′22.7″E

Architecture
- Type: Buddhist Temple
- Style: Cave temple

Asgiriya Raja Maha Vihara (Sinhala: අස්ගිරිය රජ මහා විහාරය) is an ancient Cave temple situated in Gampaha District, Sri Lanka. The temple is located on top of a hillock on the Gampaha - Minuwangoda road and approximately 2 km (1.2 mi) away from Gampaha town. The temple has been formally recognised by the Government as an archaeological site in Sri Lanka. The designation was declared on 22 November 2002 under the government Gazette number 1264.

== Name ==
It is said that the name of Asgiri was formed after the loss of the horse of Prince Uttiya, the brother of King Kelanitissa, in this area.

== History ==
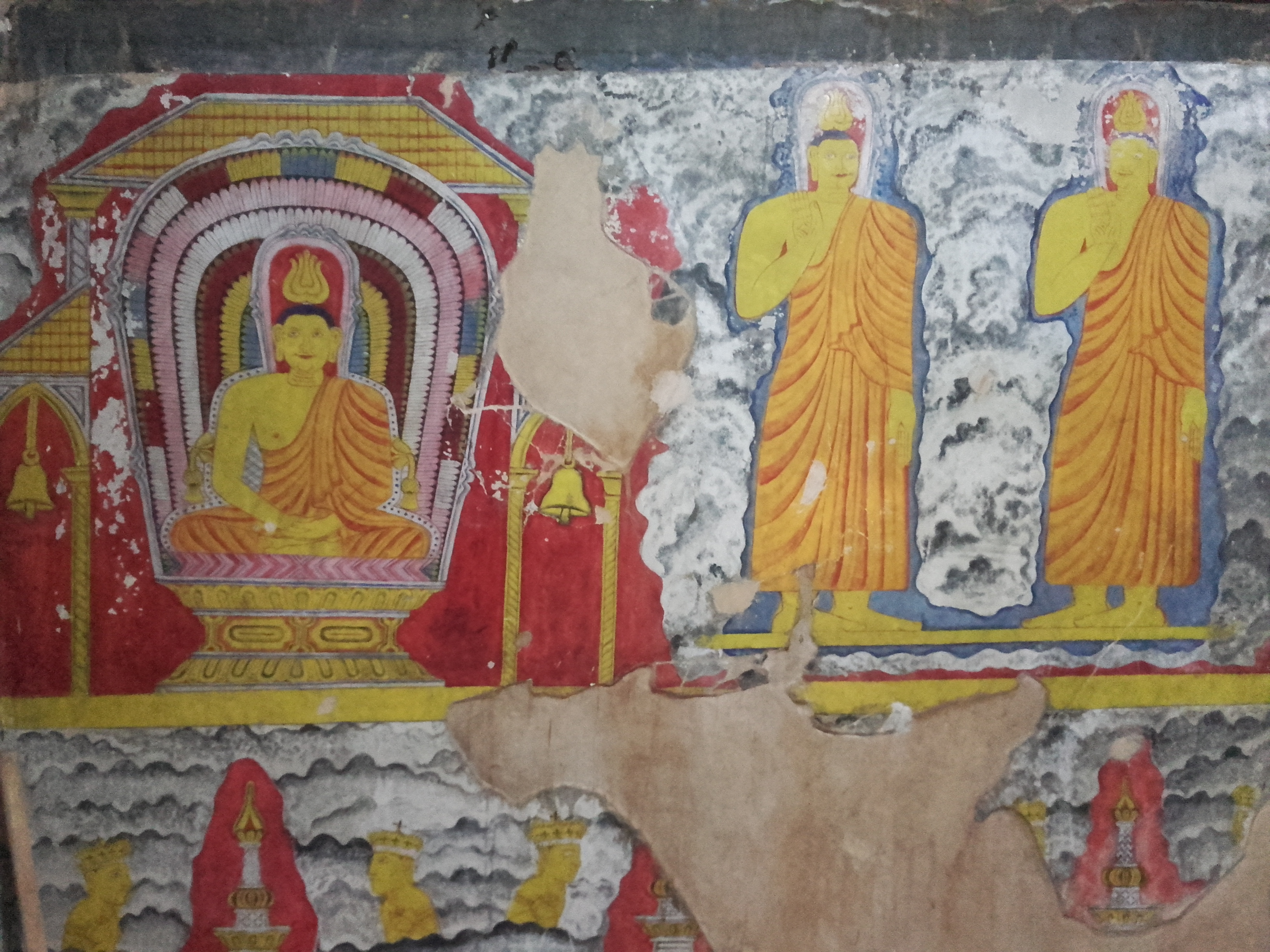
Paintings in the image house

It is believed that the history of this temple goes back to the reign of King Valagamba (89-77 BC). According to the legends King Valagamba, who fled from Anuradhapura after invasions from South India in 104 BC, stayed in this historical place from time to time. An inscription belonging to the 5th century has been discovered on the temple ground. During the reign of King Parakramabahu VI this Asgiriya Rajamaha Vihara had received the patronage by provincial king Sakalakala Wallabha.

== Structures ==
This cave temple with drip ledges has been constructed with wattle and daub. To the right of the cave temple, a Devalaya can be seen. The image house of the cave temple has been built a little high from the floor ground. A wooden flight of stairs had been made to enter it. Inside the image house, there is a Samadhi Buddha statue with features of art in the Kandyan period. On either side, images of Buddha in Abaya mudra can be seen. The canopy of the cave is decorated with lotus flowers and with various other flower designs.

In the upper ground surface of the rock, a Sannasa (Deed of grant) with the picture of a horse is found. Also, there is a pond made on the rock and the Stupa is situated adjacent to it. In the top portion of the rock surface, there is a stone with a footprint of Buddha. On the other side of the rock surface, a big cave with drip ledges can be sen.

== See also ==
- Asgiriya
