= Uththararama Purana Vihara, Udugampola =

Historic Buddhist temple at Udugampola, Sri Lanka

Uththararama Purana Vihara
- උත්තරාරාම පුරාණ විහාරය
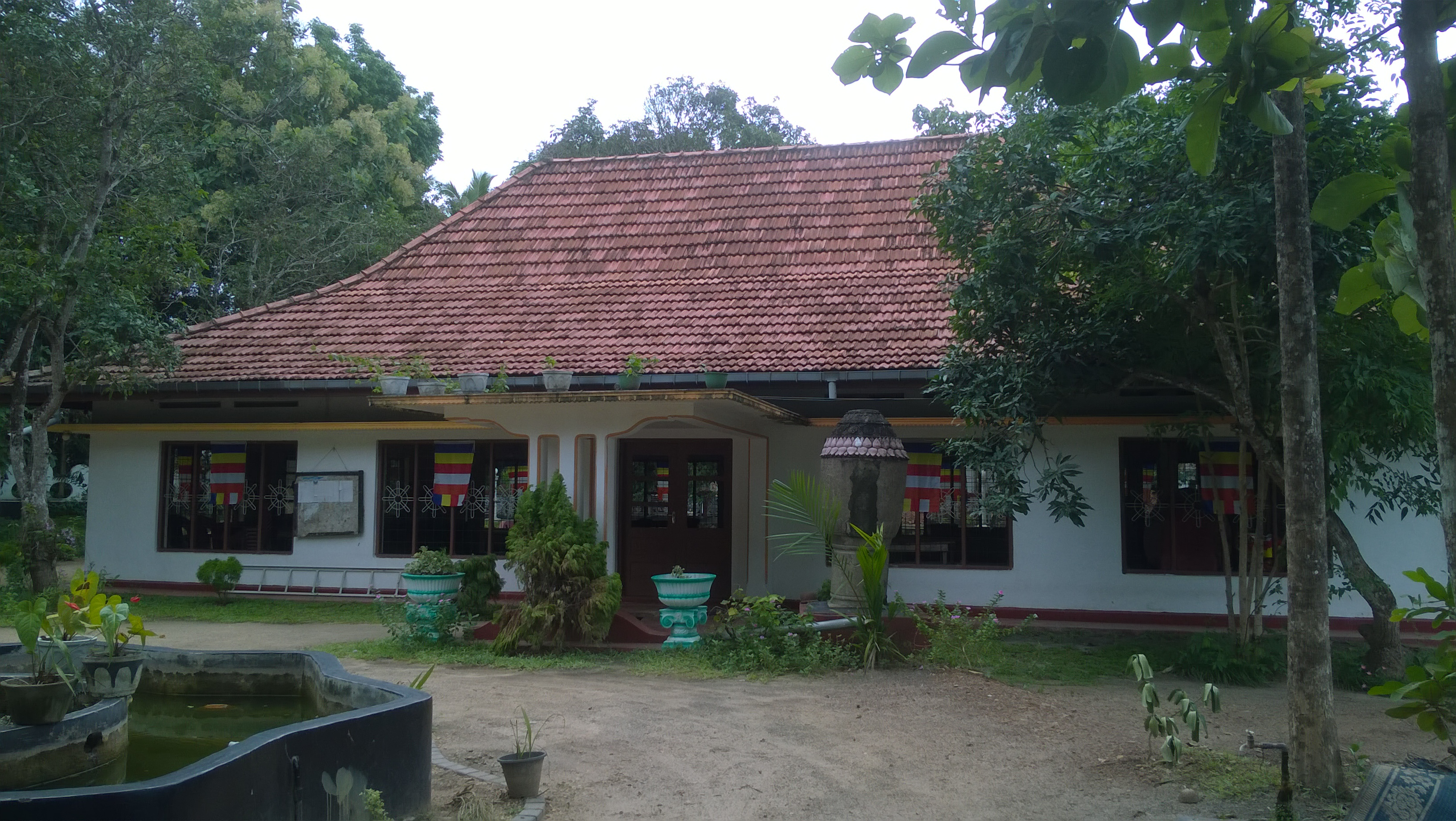
- The preaching hall and old Pintaliya

Religion
- Affiliation: Buddhism
- District: Gampaha
- Province: Western Province

Location
- Location: Udugampola, Sri Lanka
- Interactive map of Uththararama Purana Vihara
- Coordinates: 07°07′45.7″N 79°58′58.2″E

Architecture
- Type: Buddhist Temple

Uththararama Purana Vihara (also known as Maligagodella Vihara) is a historic Buddhist temple situated at Udugampola in the Western province, Sri Lanka. The temple is located on Udugampola – Weediyawatta junction road approximately 0.5 km (0.31 mi) away from the Udugampola Roundabout. The temple has been formally recognised by the Government as an archaeological site in Sri Lanka. The designation was declared on 7 July 2005 under the government Gazette number 1401.

== History ==
The historical chronicles such as Rajaveliya and Alakeshwara Yuddhaya reveal that the Udugampola and its surrounding area was a provincial kingdom during the Kotte period. According to these resources, the elder of three of sons of king Parakramabahu VIII (1484–1505) became the king of Kingdom of Kotte by the name of Dharma Parakramabahu while the second son prince Thaniya Wallabha lived in the principality of Madampe. The third son, prince Sakalakala Wallabha lived in that of Udugampola as a viceroy The evidence about the existence of a palace in Udugampola is proved by the copper plate, Kadirana Sannasa which was discovered in Kadirana cinnamon plantation near Negombo. The Sannasa records a donation made to a Brahmin by the king at a royal assembly held in his new palace at Udugampola on new moon day of (18 June 1517) when a full solar eclipse was sighted.

According to the archaeological evidences found around the area, it is believed that the place called Maligagodella (Mound of Palace) where the Uththararama temple stands today was the location of the palace of King Sakalakala Wallabha. There are some ruins still to be seen, including remains of an ancient pond with retaining walls of masonry, and some stone works. The ancient pond, Pathaha Pokuna adjoining the Uththararama temple has been identified as the bathing pool of the king.
