= Pathaha Pokuna =

- පතහ පොකුණ (Sinhala)
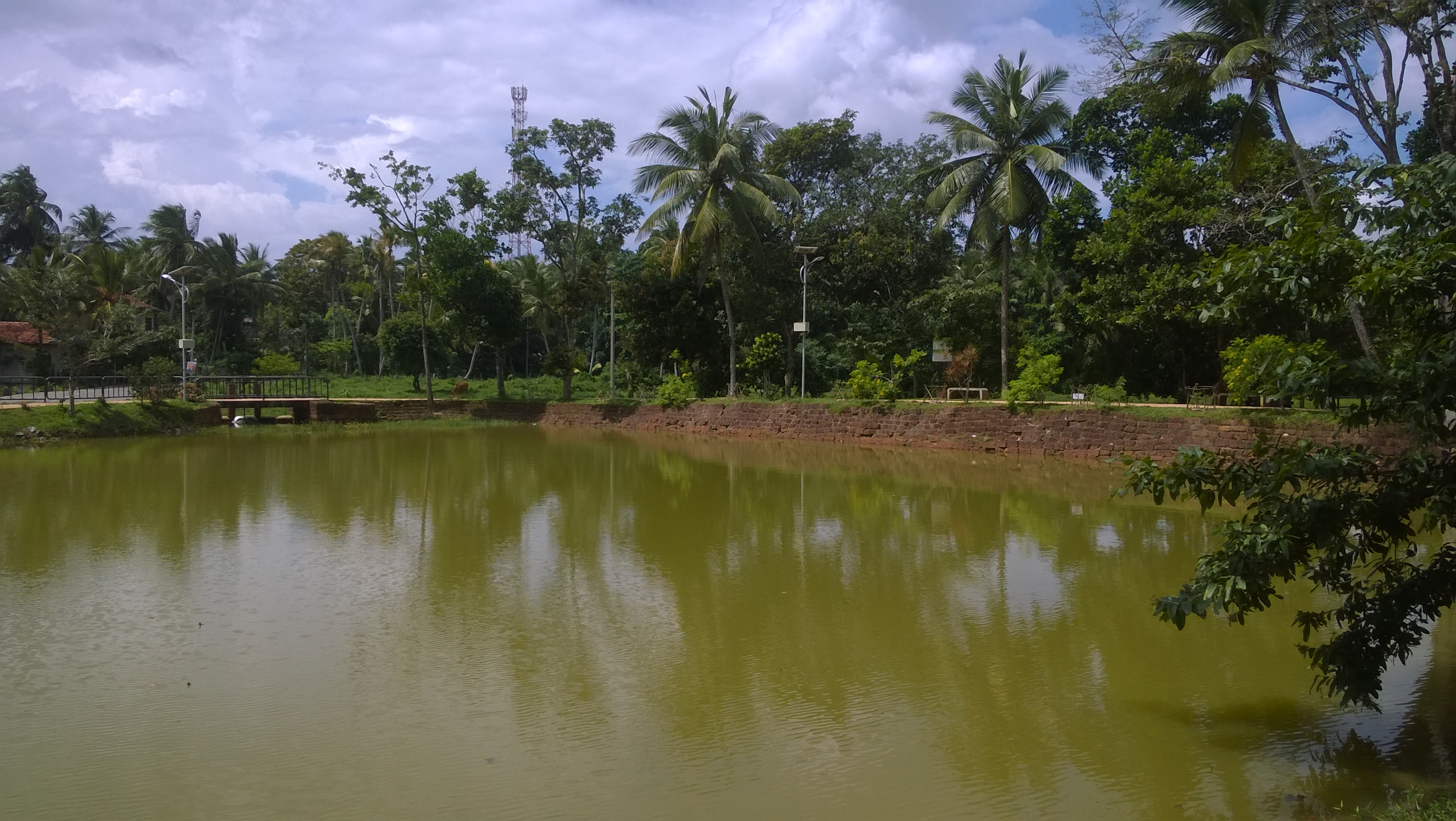

- Location within Sri Lanka
- Location: Udugampola, Sri Lanka
- Coordinates: 7°07′48.2″N 79°59′03.6″E
- Type: Bathing tank
- Designation: Archaeological protected monument (8 July 2005)
- Surface area: 2,397.362947 m^{2} (25,805.0 sq ft)

Pathaha Pokuna is an ancient bathing tank or pool situated in Udugampola, Sri Lanka. It is located approximately 0.45 km (0.28 mi) from Udugampola Roundabout and close to the historic temple Uththararama Purana Vihara. The pond has been formally recognised by the Government as an archaeological protected monument in Sri Lanka. The designation was declared on 8 July 2005 under the government Gazette number 1401.

== History ==
The information found in Rajaveliya and Alakeshwara Yuddhaya reveals that Udugampola and its surrounding area was a sub kingdom during the Kotte period. King Sakalakala Wallabha, one of three sons of King Parakramabahu VIII reign this region as a viceroy while his eldest brother King Parakramabahu IX reign the Kingdom of Kotte. The third son, King Thaniya Wallabha reign in Madampe area. According to the archaeological evidences found around the area called Maliga godella where the Udugampola Uththararama temple stands today is supposed to be place where the palace of King Sakala Kala Wallabha was situated. The Pathaha Pokuna adjoining the Uththararama temple has been identified as the bathing pool of the king.

== Folklore ==
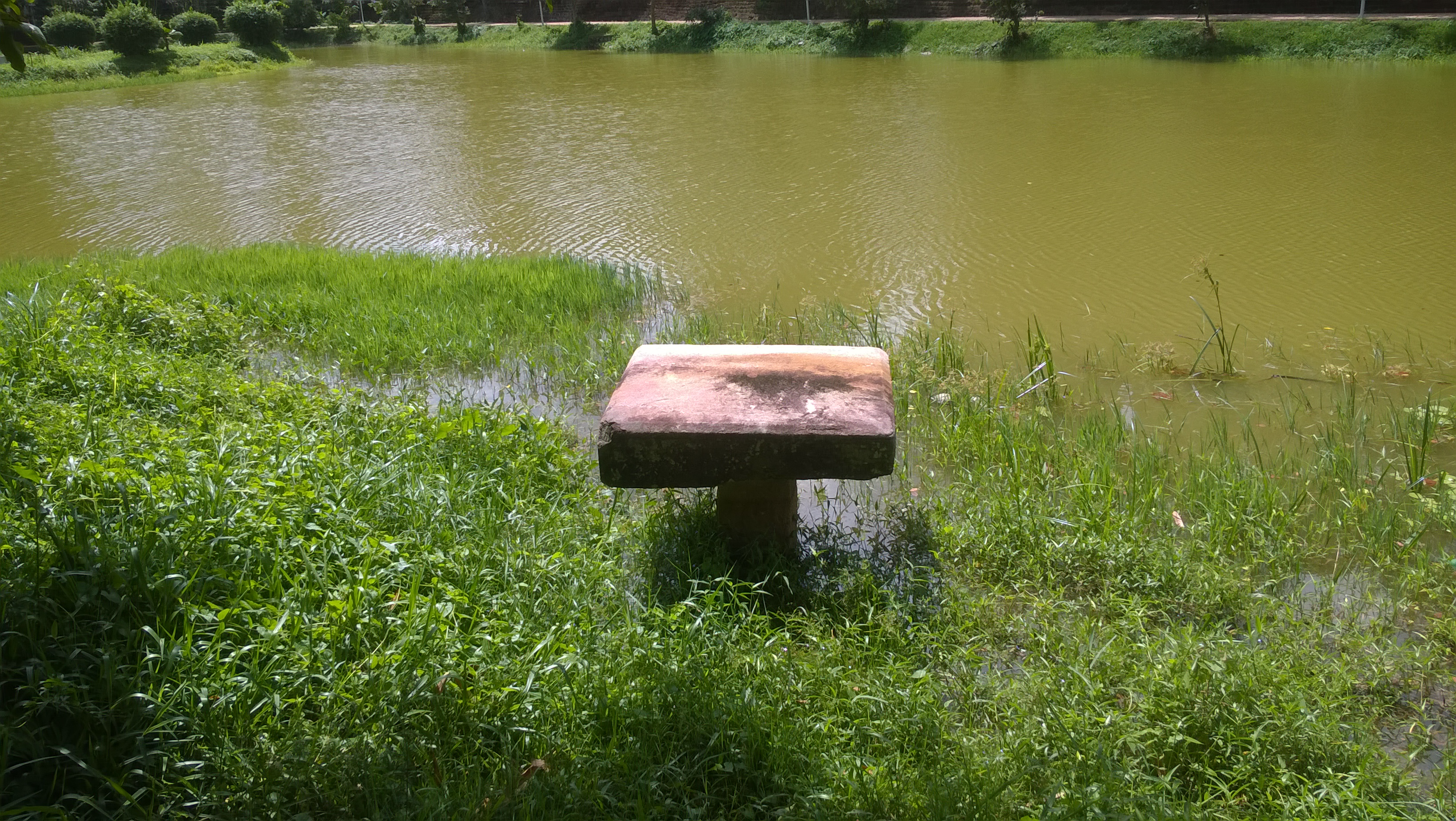
The rock which was used by King Sakala Kala Wallabha to jump into the water

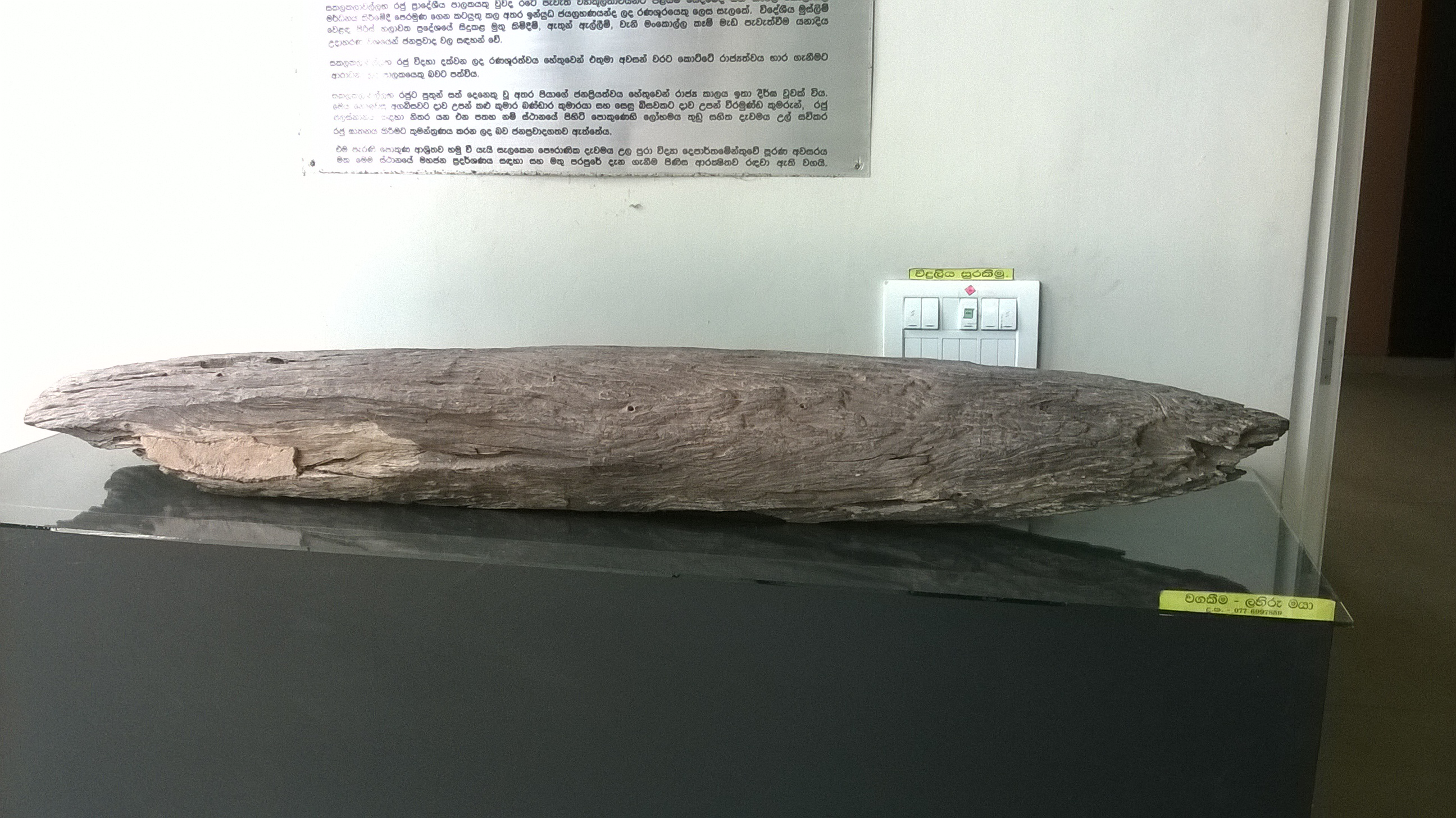
A pointed wood fragment found in the Pathaha pond. Currently this artifact has been placed at Udugampola Pradeshiya Sabha premises

King Sakalakala Wallabha is identified as a brilliant warrior in Kotta era. Being a popular king among the regional people, his reigning period and the transition of the throne was longed. Due to that his two of seven sons, prince Kalu Kumara Bandara and Veeramunda planned to kill their father by planting pointed wood with metal tips hidden under the water of Pathaha pond where the king used to bathe. But before jumping onto the points the king observed small flying insects landing on the water surface. Upon further scrutiny the king found the insects were landing on the points. Understanding the situation the king ordered the killing of his sons. But Kalu Kumara Bandara escaped and vanished to Sri Pada area and later committed suicide by jumping off a cliff. It is believed that he became a supernatural called Kalu Kumaraya .

== The pond ==
Pathaha Pokuna at Udugampola is said to be one of largest bathing pools found in Asia. Built in the shape of English letter "L", the pond is considered as an excellent construction belonging to the Udugampola principality. Its total extent is 25,805 square feet. The walls of the pond has been made of laterite with short juts protruding outwards from the bottom to the top. The laterite blocks used in the construction of the pond are vary in size but have been fitted nicely. The bunds of the south and the east banks of the pond are made of laterite blocks in a systematic manner while there is no evidence of the use of laterite for the portion of the bank extending about 122 meters to the north south direction.

== See also ==
- Kuttam Pokuna
