= Bandaranayake College, Gampaha =

1AB National School in Sri Lanka

- බණ්ඩාරනායක විද්‍යාලය, ගම්පහ

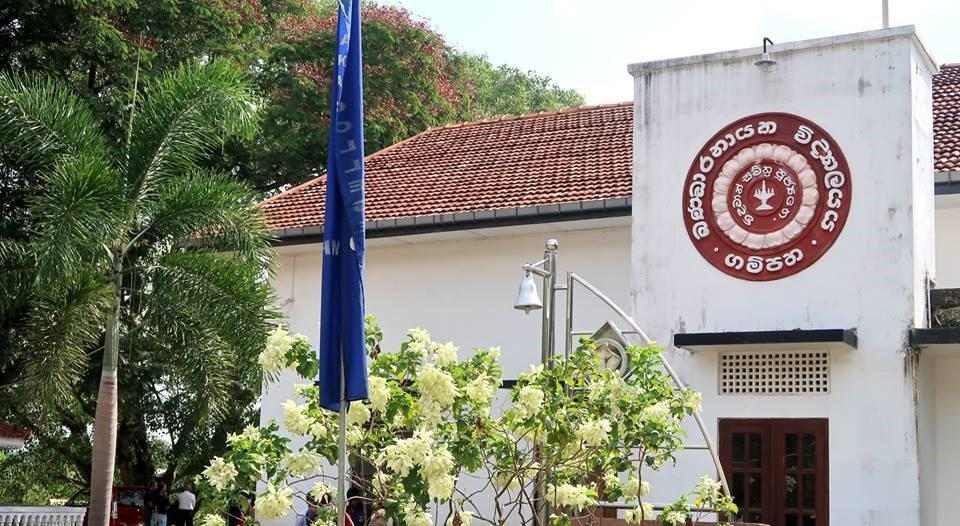

Location
- Gampaha; 11000; Sri Lanka; 7.091667°N 80.005556°E

Information
- Former names: Henarathgoda Seewali Buddhist School; Henarathgoda Senior Secondary School; Henarathgoda Secondary English School; Kasagahawatta Maha Vidyalaya; Bandaranayake Maha Vidyalaya; Bandaranayake College (since 1993)
- Type: 1AB National School
- Motto: "විද්වාන් සර්‍වත්‍ර පූජ්‍යතේ"; Sanskrit: "Vidwan Sarvatra Pujyate" (Scholar is always honoured)
- Religious affiliation: Theravada Buddhism
- Established: 18 September 1918; 108 years ago
- Founder: Charles Samarasooriya
- Sister school: Yasodara Devi Balika Vidyalaya, Gampaha
- School district: Gampaha District
- Authority: Government of Sri Lanka
- Educational authority: Ministry of Education
- School code: BCG
- Principal: Sarath Bandu Gunasekara
- Staff: 500
- Teaching staff: 300
- Grades: 6 - 13
- Gender: Boys
- Age range: 10 to 19
- Enrolment: 6,000
- Classes: A - J (10), A - S (19)
- Education system: National Education System
- Language: Sinhala and English
- Schedule: 07:30 - 13:30 (SLST)
- Hours in school day: 6 Hours
- Campus size: 10-hectare (25-acre)
- Campus type: Urban
- Houses: Vijaya; Gemunu; Tissa; Parakrama
- Colours: Navy blue and maroon
- Song: නමදිමු බණ්ඩාරනායක විදුහල් මාතා…
- Team name: Nayakenz
- Alumni: Old Boys' Association
- Alumni name: Old Nayakenz
- Website: bcg.lk

Bandaranayake College, Gampaha (Sinhala: බණ්ඩාරනායක විද්‍යාලය, ගම්පහ) is a boys' school in Gampaha, Sri Lanka, founded on 18 September 1918. The school has a student population approximately 6,000 across 8 grades from grade 6 to advanced level classes, on a campus of 10 ha (25 acres). Boys are admitted at grade six, based on the results of an island-wide Scholarship Examination.

== History ==
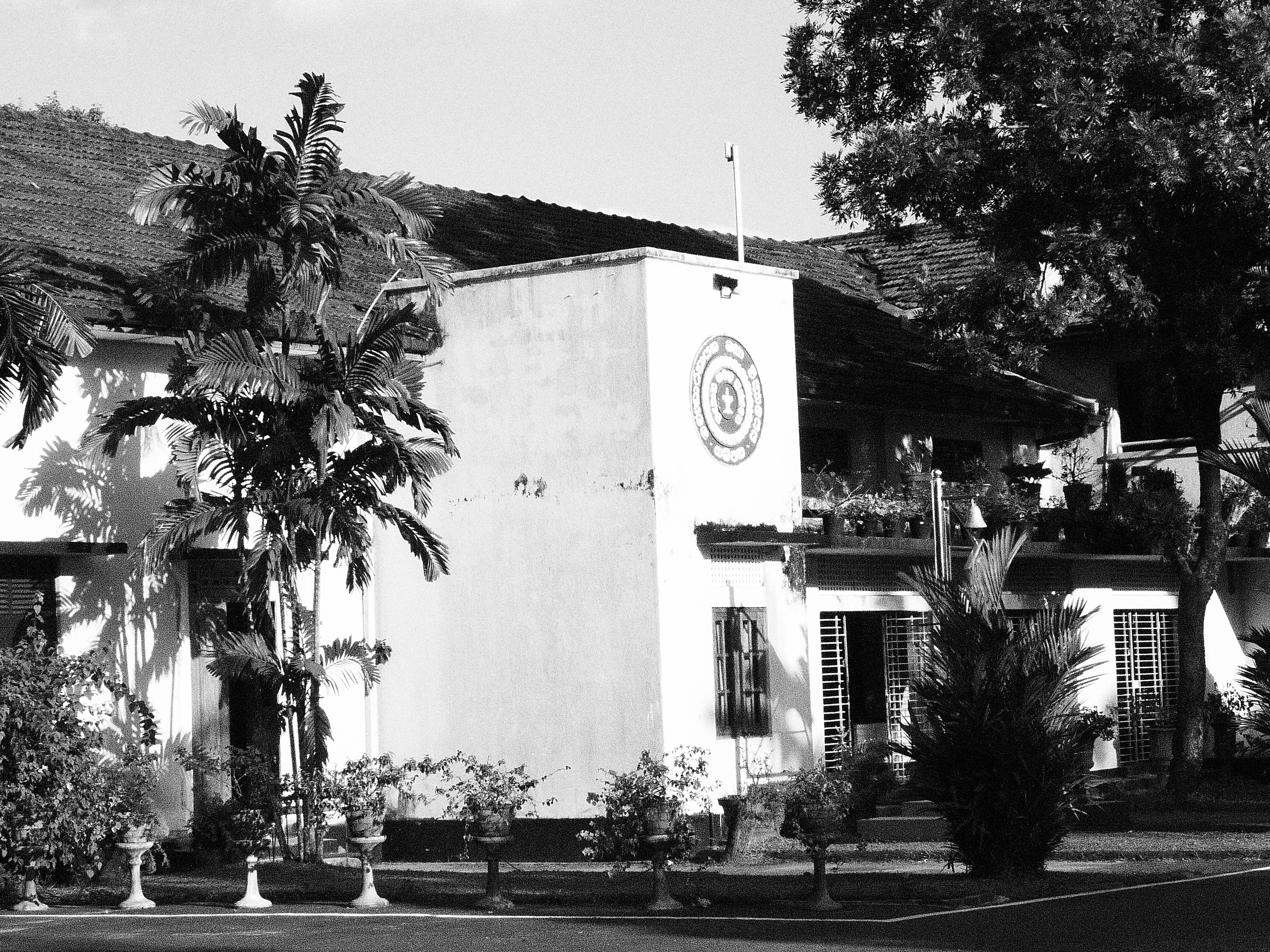

In 1918, this school was established as Henarathgoda Seewali Buddhist School at the place where Yasodara Devi Balika Vidyalaya is presently located. Charles Samarasooriya was the first principal of the school. In 1949, the school was established as the Henarathgoda Senior Secondary School, and then it was established as the Henarathgoda Secondary English School at its present location. When the school was established at its current location, Jinadasa Munasinghe was the principal.

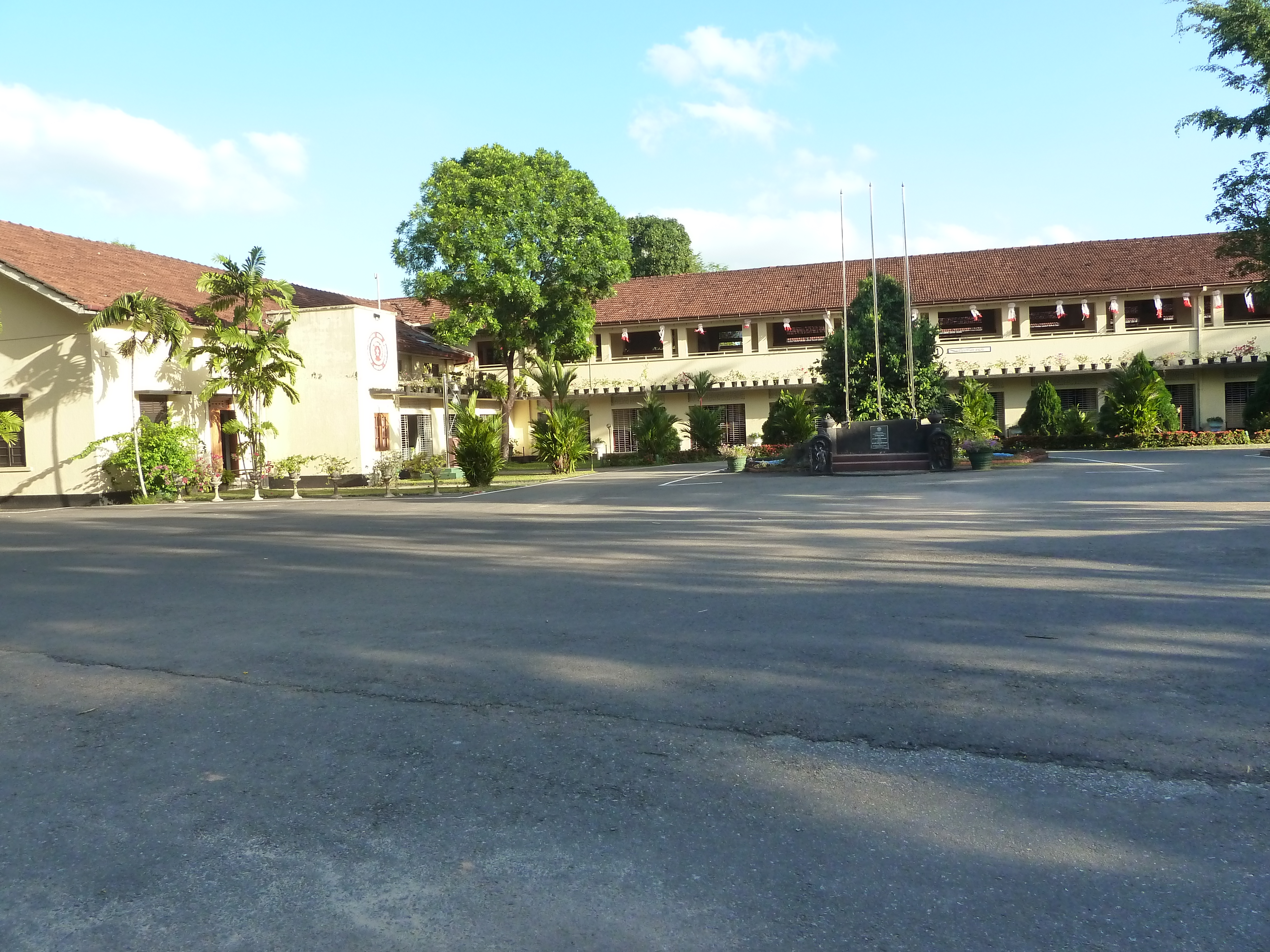

In 1923, this school was promoted as a first grade school. It had been a mixed-sex school up to 1985, when it became a single sex (male) school. On 25 May 1993, the school was advanced to the national level as, Bandaranayake Vidyalaya.

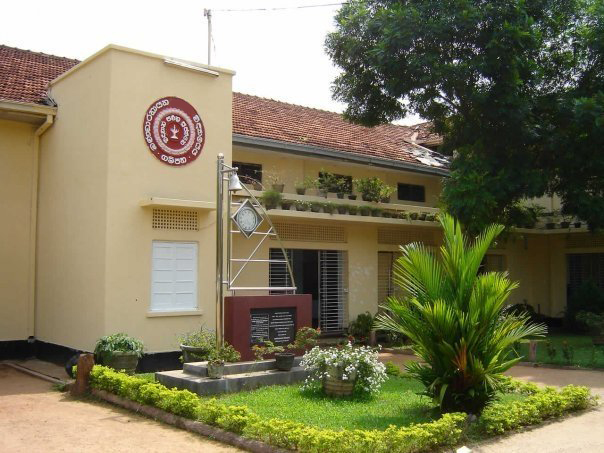

=== Principals ===
Principal	From	To	Notes
Charles Samarasooriya	1918	1923	
G. S. Selviya	1923	1924	
E. W. P. Samaranayake	1925	1938	
D. H. Silva	1939	1941	
K. A. Peris	1941	1944	
D. W. P. Samarasinghe	1944	1948	
M. A. R. Cooray	1949	1953	
Jinadasa Munasinghe	1954	1968	Established the school at its current location.
S. A. W. Subasinghe	1968	1972	
D. N. Rajapakse	1972	1979	
D. S. Gunapala	1979	1980	
E. Jayanettiarachchi	1980	1982	
A. J. K. Jayasundara	1982	1983	
P. Udugampola	1983	1988	School was converted into a boys' school in 1985.
P. P. D. T. Aquinas	1988	1991	
S. K. Mallawaarachchi	1991	1992	
R. M. Sumanapala	1992	1998	Elevated the college to National School status.
M. L. B. Peiris	1998		
B. A. Abeyratne	1998	2001	
J. H. M. W. Ranjith	2001	2002	
W. M. J. Wickramanayake	2002	2004	
P. R. Nonis	2004	2005	
A. D. M. D. Bandara	2005	2006	
Labuthale Sudassana Thero	2006	2012	
Lal Dissanayake	2012	2017	
Iran Champika de Silva	2017	2023	Later became Principal of Nalanda College, Colombo
M. R. D. Kasun Gunarathna	2023	2025	
Jagath Jayakody	2025		His term was brief (April–July) due to administrative unrest.
Kusuman M. Ranasinghe	2025	2026	Acting principal
G. D. Sarath Bandu Gunasekara	2026	present	

== Media ==
- Siyanesara FM (Estd. 1993) - Sri Lanka's first school radio channel. - FM 103.1 / FM 96.1
- Siyane Roo TV (Estd. 2008) - Sri Lanka's second school TV channel.

== Notable alumni ==
Name	Notability
Nuwan Kulasekara	International cricket player (2003–2019)
H. R. Mithrapala	Member of Sri Lanka Parliament - Kegalle (2004–2015)
Nilanka Premaratne	First-class cricket player
Ajith Mannapperuma	Member of Sri Lanka Parliament - Gampaha (2013–2020; 2021–2024); mayor Gampaha (2006–2009)
Anura Priyadharshana	Member of Sri Lanka Parliament - Kurunegala (1994–2024)
Neil Rosayro	Deputy chief of staff (Navy) - Eastern Naval Area (2016–?)
Milan Jayathilaka	Member of Sri Lanka Parliament - Gampaha (2020–2024)
K. N. O. Dharmadasa	Senior Professor; Former Dean of the Faculty of Arts, University of Peradeniya
Udeni Rajapaksa	19th Commander of the Air Force (2023–2025)
Sahan Arachchige	International cricket player (2023–present)
Ruwan Mapalagama	Member of Sri Lanka Parliament - Gampaha (2024–present)
Koyan Chamitha	First Sri Lankan to complete the Basic Underwater Demolition/SEAL training conducted by the USN
