= Gampaha Electoral District (1947–1989) =

Electoral district of Sri Lanka

Gampaha electoral district was an electoral district of Sri Lanka between August 1947 and February 1989. The district was named after the city of Gampaha in present-day Gampaha District, Western Province. The 1978 Constitution of Sri Lanka introduced the proportional representation electoral system for electing members of Parliament. The existing 160 mainly single-member electoral districts were replaced with 22 multi-member electoral districts. Gampaha electoral district was replaced by the Gampaha multi-member electoral district at the 1989 general elections, the first under the PR system, though Gampaha continues to be a polling division of the multi-member electoral district.

== Members of Parliament ==
Key

Independent SLFP UNP

Election	Member	Party	Term
1947	D. D. Karunaratne	UNP	1947–1949
1949 (by-election)	P. P. Jayawardena	UNP	1949–1952
1952	S. D. Bandaranayake	SLFP	1952–1956
1956	S. D. Bandaranayake	SLFP	1956–1960
1960	S. D. Bandaranayake	SLFP	1960-1960
1960	S. D. Bandaranayake	SLFP	1960–1965
1965	S. D. Bandaranayake	SLFP	1965–1970
1970	A. T. Basnayake	SLFP	1970–1977
1977	S. D. Bandaranayake	SLFP	1977–1989

== Elections ==
=== 1947 Parliamentary General Election ===
Results of the 1st parliamentary election held between 23 August 1947 and 20 September 1947 for the district:

Candidate	Party	Symbol	Votes	%
D. D. Karunaratne	United National Party	Hand	11,786	38.04
C. A. Mathew	Lanka Sama Samaja Party	Star	8,416	27.16
A. C. Seneviratne	Independent	Lamp	5,640	18.20
W.C.L. Perera		Elephant	2,740	8.84
F. Obeyasekera		Bicycle	1,333	4.30
R. Deshapriya		Cart Wheel	529	1.71
O. Weerasinghe		Chair	181	0.58
Valid Votes			30,625	98.84
Rejected Votes			358	1.16
Total Polled			30,983	100.00
Registered Electors			54,520	
Turnout				56.83

=== 1952 Parliamentary General Election ===
Results of the 2nd parliamentary election held between 24 May 1952 and 30 May 1952 for the district:

Candidate	Party	Symbol	Votes	%
S. D. Bandaranayake		Umbrella	19,417	49.06
B. L. Seneviratne		Hand	18,546	46.86
A. C. W. F. A. Jayawardena		Star	735	1.86
Arthur Seneviratne		Elephant	475	1.20
Valid Votes			39,173	98.98
Rejected Votes			404	1.02
Total Polled			39,577	100.00
Registered Electors			57,423	
Turnout				68.92

=== 1956 Parliamentary General Election ===
Results of the 3rd parliamentary election held between 5 April 1956 and 10 April 1956 for the district:

Candidate	Party	Symbol	Votes	%
S. D. Bandaranayake		Hand	34,898	85.08
J. W. D. Paulis Perera		Elephant	5,096	12.42
H. W. P. Lokeshvara		Cart Wheel	772	1.88
Valid Votes			40,766	99.38
Rejected Votes			253	0.62
Total Polled			41,019	100.00
Registered Electors			65,480	
Turnout				62.64

=== 1960 (March) Parliamentary General Election ===
Results of the 4th parliamentary election held on 19 March 1960 for the district:

Candidate	Party	Symbol	Votes	%
S. D. Bandaranayake		Butterfly	9,565	34.58%
K. M. U. Jayanetti	Mahajana Eksath Peramuna	Cart Wheel	7,839	28.20
H. R. Seneviratne	United National Party	Elephant	7,816	28.12
Robert Samarakkody		Key	1,833	6.59
Hemachandra Panagoda		Umbrella	276	0.99
Gemunudasa Ariyawansa		Ladder	149	0.54
Cyrus W. Surendra		Lamp	106	0.38
P. R. Karunanayake		Eye	76	0.27
Valid Votes			27,660	99.50
Rejected Votes			139	0.50
Total Polled			27,799	100.00
Registered Electors			35,724	
Turnout				77.82

=== 1960 (July) Parliamentary General Election ===
Results of the 5th parliamentary election held on 20 July 1960 for the district:

Candidate	Party	Symbol	Votes	%
S. D. Bandaranayake	Sri Lanka Freedom Party	Hand	16,842	62.39
H. R. Seneviratne	United National Party	Elephant	8,859	32.82
K. M. U. Jayanetti		Cart Wheel	1,215	4.50
Valid Votes			26,916	99.72
Rejected Votes			77	0.28
Total Polled			26,993	100.00
Registered Electors			35,724	
Turnout				75.56

=== 1965 Parliamentary General Election ===
Results of the 6th parliamentary election held on 22 March 1965 for the district:

Candidate	Party	Symbol	Votes	%
S. D. Bandaranayake	Sri Lanka Freedom Party	Hand	21,114	58.90
K. M. U. Jayanetti	Mahajana Eksath Peramuna	Cart Wheel	14,228	39.69
D. Edmund Senarath		Chair	238	0.66
Valid Votes			35,580	99.26
Rejected Votes			266	0.74
Total Polled			35,846	100.00
Registered Electors			44,024	
Turnout				81.42

=== 1970 Parliamentary General Election ===
Results of the 7th parliamentary election held on 27 May 1970 for the district:

Candidate	Party	Symbol	Votes	%
A. T. Basnayake	Sri Lanka Freedom Party	Hand	26,057	59.91
Alfred Jayawardena	United National Party	Elephant	13,846	31.83
S. D. Bandaranayake		Butterfly	3,485	8.01
Valid Votes			43,388	99.75
Rejected Votes			108	0.25
Total Polled			43,496	100.00
Registered Electors			50,471	
Turnout				86.18

=== 1977 Parliamentary General Election ===
Results of the 8th parliamentary election held on 21 July 1977 for the district:

Candidate	Party	Symbol	Votes	%
S. D. Bandaranayake	Sri Lanka Freedom Party	Hand	26,338	49.15
Chandra Jayakodi	United National Party	Elephant	25,816	48.18
M. A. Piyasena		Key	1,141	2.13
M. R. Wansus Laus Perera		Butterfly	124	0.23
Valid Votes			53,419	99.69
Rejected Votes			164	0.31
Total Polled			53,583	100.00
Registered Electors			60,822	
Turnout				88.10
