= S. D. Bandaranayake =

Sri Lankan politician (1917–2014)

Hon. S. D. Bandaranayake

Member of the Ceylon Parliament for Gampaha District
- In office 1952–1970
- Preceded by: P. P. Jayawardena
- Succeeded by: A. T. Basnayake

Member of Parliament for Gampaha
- In office 1977–1989
- Preceded by: A. T. Basnayake
- Succeeded by: seat abolished

Personal details
- Born: 1 December 1917 Matara, Ceylon
- Died: 3 June 2014 (aged 96)
- Party: Sri Lanka Freedom Party
- Spouse: Dorin Dias Bandaranaike
- Children: 3, including Pandu

Samuel Dias Bandaranayake (1 December 1917 – 3 June 2014) was a Sri Lankan socialist politician and a member of parliament representing Gampaha.

== Early life and education ==
Born to a wealthy family, his father was Conrad Peter Dias Bandaranayake, Muhandiram of the Guard and Siyane Korale and his mother was the daughter of Mudaliyar Ekanayake from Matara, his grandfather was Conrad (Peter) Petrus Dias Wijewardena Bandaranaike, Maha Mudaliyar. He was a cousin of S. W. R. D. Bandaranaike. He was educated at S. Thomas' College, Mount Lavinia, St. Thomas' College, Matara and studied agriculture at the University of Travancore. While in India he met figures such as Subhas Chandra Bose and Rabindranath Tagore. On his return he joined the newly formed Ceylon Agricultural Corps as a Commandant during World War II.

After the war he entered politics, campaigning for S. W. R. D. Bandaranaike and joined his newly formed Sri Lanka Freedom Party. He was elected to parliament in 1952 general election from the Gampaha electorate, however he did not accept the office due to disagreements with S. W. R. D. Bandaranaike on the Sinhala Only Act. However, he was instrumental in stopping J. R. Jayewardene's march to Kandy in protest of the Bandaranaike–Chelvanayakam Pact. He was re-elected in the next four elections in 1956, 1960 March, 1960 July and 1965. He lost his seat to A. T. Basnayake of the Sri Lanka Freedom Party, having contested the 1970 general election as an independent.

He was involved in the 1971 JVP Insurrection against the SLFP led government under Sirimavo Bandaranaike. The Criminal Justice Commission which was set up to prosecute insurgents found him guilty of two counts of being a member of the JVP and attending the five lectures. He was given a suspended sentence of two years. In 1977, he was reelected in the 1977 general election from the Sri Lanka Freedom Party.

== Family ==
His son, Pandu, was a member of parliament, representing Gampaha between 1994 and 2009.

== See also ==
- List of political families in Sri Lanka
- Bandaranaike family
