= K. N. O. Dharmadasa =

Senior professor

Karuna Nayaka Ovitigalage Dharmadasa
- Born: Gampaha, Sri Lanka
- Education: Bandaranayake College Gampaha; Nalanda College, Colombo
- Occupation: Academic
- Known for: former Dean of the Faculty of Arts, University of Peradeniya, Sri Lanka

Karuna Nayaka Ovitigalage Dharmadasa is one of the pioneers of linguistics in Sri Lanka and scholar of international repute. He is Professor Emeritus, and the former Dean of the Faculty of Arts at the University of Peradeniya, Sri Lanka.

== Early life and education ==
Karuna Nayaka Ovitigalage Dharmadasa was born in a small village, Oruthota, north of Gampaha. His early education was at the Buddhist Boys' School in Gampaha run by the BTS. Later he joined the Government Senior Secondary School (now Bandaranayake College Gampaha) and then Nalanda College Colombo. Dharmadasa then attended the University of Ceylon (Peradeniya) in 1959. Premasara Epasinghe was a classmate of Professor Dharmadasa at Nalanda.

Dharmadasa was presented the Nalanda Keerthi Sri award by Nalanda College, Colombo in 2013.

He was awarded the "Swarna Puthra" by Bandaranayake College in 2014.

== Family ==
Dharmadasa is married to Sumangalika, the eldest daughter of Mohottalage Dingiri Banda (former Cabinet Minister). They have two daughters, Dinithi Sevanji and Lahiru Chaturika. Dinithi is a lecturer in English at the University of Colombo and Lahiru is a lecturer in botany at the Open University of Sri Lanka.

== Career ==
After graduating from the Peradeniya University, he joined the Peradeniya University as a temporary assistant lecturer and was an academic getting promoted to senior lecturer, associate professor, professor and senior professor until he retired in 2004. He obtained M.Phil. (Linguistics) from the University of York (England) in 1968 and his Ph.D. (Sociology of Language) from Monash University (Australia) in 1979. During his career he has received many international awards such as Fellowship from the Japan Foundation for the Promotion of Science, Scholar in Residence Award (Fulbright-Hays)Fellowship, International Forum of US Studies (Univ. of Iowa) and Senior Fellowship, The School of Oriental and African Studies, The University of London.

He had written many books both in Sinhala and English on a variety of subjects that have been published locally and abroad.

He is also the chief editor of the Sinhala Encyclopedia. The Rajarata University of Sri Lanka honored him with the award of D.Litt. (Honoris Causa) in 2012.

== General references ==
- "K.N.O. Dharmadasa was awarded by swarna puthra award". Lankadeepa Paper. 2014-07-06. Archived from the original on 2014-07-07.
- "K.N.O. Dharmadasa - linguist who doesn't rest on his laurels". Dailynews Paper. 2012-01-03.
- "Judicial independence & appointments to the judiciary". Sunday Times. 28 February 1999.
- "Dharmapala's mission was to re-establish Buddhism in its birthplace: Prof. Dissanayake". Sunday Times.
