= Canadian cricket team in Sri Lanka in 2000–01 =

Sporting tour

The Canada national cricket team toured Sri Lanka in May 2001 and played eight one-day matches against various provincial teams in Colombo, Galle, Moratuwa and Gampaha.
