= Siriwardhana =

Siriwardhana is a surname. Notable people with the surname include:

- Ayana Siriwardhana (born 1999), Sri Lankan cricketer
- Stephanie Siriwardhana (born 1988), Sri Lankan-Lebanese TV host
- W. L. Siriwardhana, Sri Lankan volleyball player
