= Rathnavali Balika Vidyalaya, Gampaha =

Rathnavali Balika Vidyalaya Gampaha

Location
- Gampaha, Western Province; Sri Lanka; 7°05′21.8″N 80°00′05.9″E

Information
- Type: National
- Motto: කරෝථ බුද්ධ සාසනං Karotha Buddha Sāsanan (From the Dhammapada, specifically Verse 223, Arahantavagga) (Behave according to Buddhism)
- Religious affiliation: Buddhism
- Established: 17 December 1947; 78 years ago
- Founder: Don David Karunaratne
- School code: RBV
- Principal: M. G. R. W. R. Kumari
- Staff: 250
- Grades: Grades 6-13
- Gender: Girls
- Age range: 11-19
- Enrollment: 4,000
- Education system: National Education System
- Language: Sinhala/ English
- Hours in school day: 07:30-13:30
- Colors: Pure white, dark green
- Song: සාදන ශිල්ප කලා
- Sports: Cricket, Netball, Badminton, Elle, Table Tennis
- Affiliation: Ministry of Education
- Alumni: Old Rathnavalians
- Website: rathnavali.lk

Rathnavali Balika Vidyalaya (Sinhala: රත්නාවලී බාලිකා විද්‍යාලය) is a government Buddhist national school for girls situated in Gampaha, Western Province, Sri Lanka. The school is affiliated with the national education system and provides education to students from grade 6 up to grade 13 in both the Sinhala medium and English medium. The school is selective for admission and the majority of students gain entry to grade 6 through the national grade 5 Scholarship Examination.

== History ==
There was a significant Buddhist reawakening with the arrival of Colonel Henry Steel Olcott. Buddhist schools were established throughout the country to promote Buddhist education across with the prevailing missionary system. In 1881 there was a Buddhist reawakening as a result of the start of the newspapers Sarasavi Sandaresa in 1880 and The Buddhist in 1881. After that, the expansion of school education came under the Buddhist Theosophical Society. Karunarathna laid the foundation stone for the school on 26 July 1945. After completing the construction work of the buildings of Rathnavali Balika Vidyalaya, D. D. Karunaratne handed over the school to the Buddhist Theosophical Society.

Rathnavali Balika Vidyalaya was opened on 17 December 1947 with 60 students, a staff consist of two teachers under the management of Mrs. Denagama who was the first principal of Rathnavali Balika Vidyalaya. On the same day, both primary and secondary education were started as the constructions of the two buildings were completed.

== Houses ==
There are four houses in Rathnavali Balika Vidyalaya which are named after four ancient feminine characters in Sri Lankan history.

- Gotami - purple
- Mahamaya - red
- Sangamitta - blue
- Wisaka - orange

== Sports ==
=== Cricket ===
The annual cricket match between Rathnavali Balika Vidyalaya and Anula Vidyalaya, is known as the Battle of the Queens. The inaugural match took place on 4 May 2017, at the R. Premadasa International Cricket Stadium in Colombo. In that first encounter, Anula Vidyalaya emerged victorious winning the first innings and dismissing Rathnavali Balika Vidyalaya for 139 runs.

The second edition of the match occurred on 11 May 2018, at the same venue. This time Rathnavali Balika Vidyalaya clinched their first win in the series, defeating Anula Vidyalaya by 29 runs.

Vishmi Gunaratne, a student of Rathnavali Balika Vidyalaya, has gone on to represent the Sri Lankan women's national cricket team at the international level, making her debut in both ODI and T20I formats.
