= St. Peter's College, Gampaha =

St Peter's College, Gampaha

Location
- Udugampola, Minuwangoda; Sri Lanka
- Coordinates: 7.1336°N 79.9794°E

Information
- Former name: St. Peter's College, Udugampola
- Type: Semi Government
- Motto: Virtus Et Veritas (Virtue and Truth)
- Religious affiliation: Roman Catholic
- Established: 2 February 1993; 33 years ago
- Founder: Most Rev. Dr. Oswald Gomis
- Rector: Rev Fr. Vincent A. Ashley
- Grades: 1 – 13
- Gender: Boys & Girls
- Age: 5 to 19
- Enrollment: 1500
- Colours: Blue, white and gold
- Website: stpetersgampahabranch.lk

St. Peter's College, Gampaha Branch (Sinhala: සාන්ත පීතර විදුහල, ගම්පහ ශාඛාව Tamil: புனித பேதுரு கல்லூரி, கம்பஹா கிளை) is a boys and girls primary to secondary (inclusive) and was a branch school of St Peter's College, Colombo. It is located in the Udugampola zone of Minuwangoda, Sri Lanka, and was founded on 2 February 1993. Even though the school is located in Gampaha district, St. Peter's College, Gampaha belongs to the Minuwangoda educational Zone.

== History ==
St. Peter’s College, is a co-educational institution that provides primary to secondary education. It was initially established as a branch of St. Peter’s College, Colombo, and has since grown into a distinguished academic institution. The school is located in Udugampola, Minuwangoda, Sri Lanka, and belongs to the Minuwangoda Educational Zone, despite being situated within the Gampaha District.

Founded on 2 February 1993, St. Peter’s College, Gampaha Branch, was first housed within the Holy Cross Church premises, commonly referred to as Gal Palliya. The establishment of the branch school was a significant initiative spearheaded by the Auxiliary Bishop of Colombo, Oswald Gomis, under the patronage of the Archbishop of Colombo, Nicholas Marcus Fernando and Joe. E. Wickremasinghe, the Rector of St. Peter’s College, Colombo.

== Houses ==
Anthony House
Named after Antoine Coudert, Archbishop of Colombo (1903–1928) and founding archbishop who supported St. Peter's College.

Nicholas House
Named after D. J. Nicholas Perera, president of St. Joseph's College, Colombo South (1922–1927) and first Rector of St. Peter's College, Colombo (1927–1943)

Maurice House
Named after Maurice Le Goc, rector of St. Joseph's College, Colombo (1921–1940), founder and rector (1922-1927) of St. Joseph's College, Colombo.

Peter House
Named after Pierre-Guillaume Marque, Archbishop of Colombo (1930–1937), archbishop at the initiation of the house system.

== Principals ==
T. M. B. Thilak Rodrigo	1993–2003
Mathew Bernad Fernando	2003–2007
J. J. Siri Cooray	2007–2010
P. Anton Ranjith	2010–2012
M. Chaminda Wanigasena	2012–2014
Lakmin Silva	2014–2017
Jayashantha Sovis	2018-2019
Crishantha Kumara	2019–2022
Vincent Ashley	2022–present
