= Satmahal Prasada =

12th century step pyramid in Sri Lanka

Coordinates: 7°56′53″N 81°00′07″E

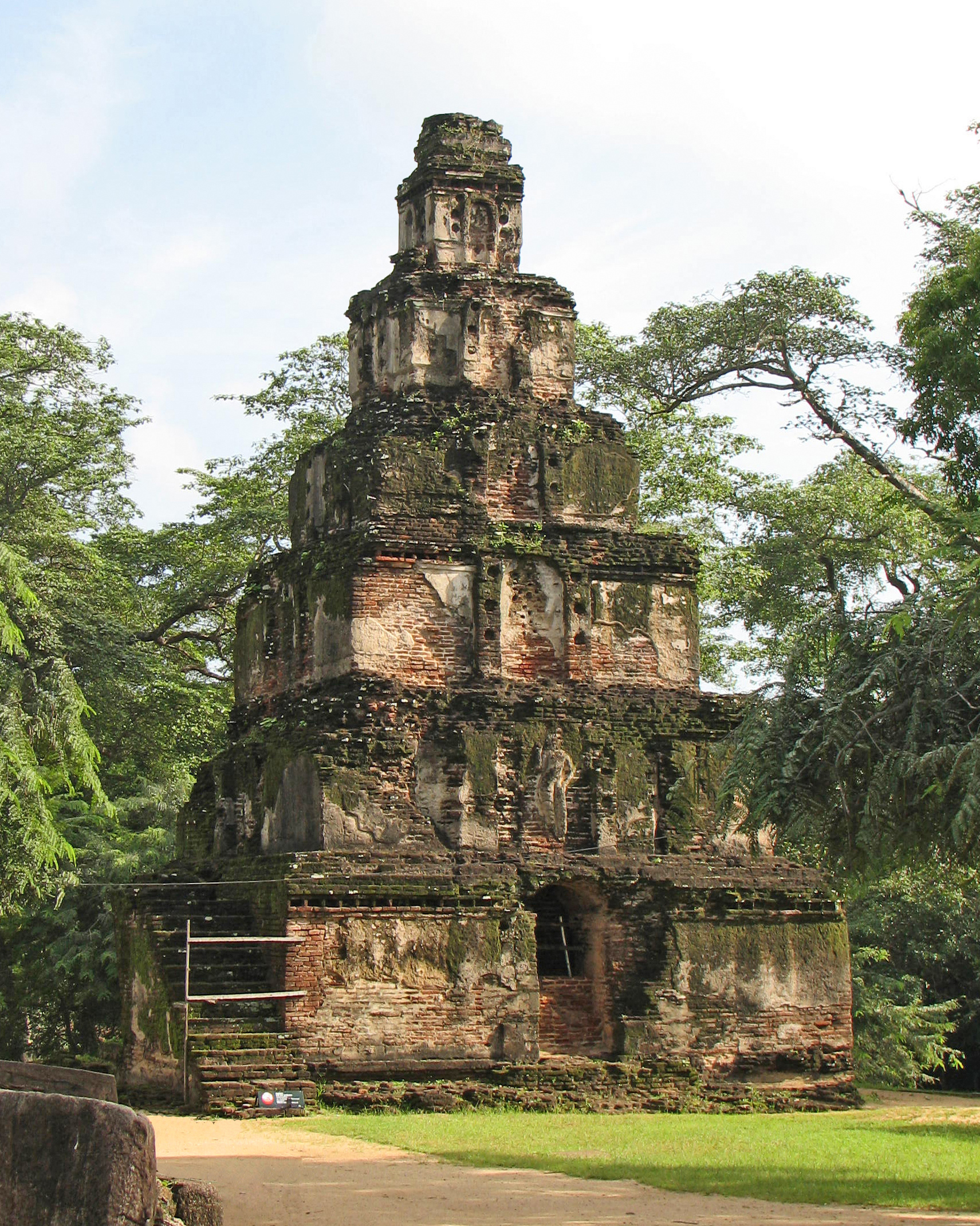
The Satmahal Prasada in Polonaruwa.

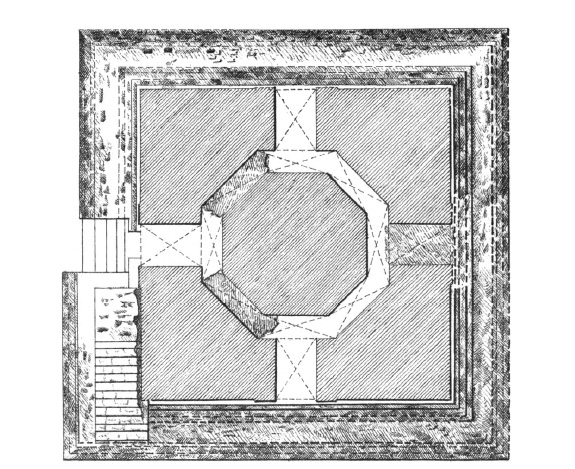
Ground plan of the Satmahal Prasada, with four entrances to a corridor surrounding an octagonal solid structure, maybe a reliquary

The Satmahal Prasada ("seven-story tower") is a 12th-century step pyramid in the northeast corner of the archaeological complex of Polonnaruwa in Sri Lanka. It is believed to be a stupa because it is in a Buddhist environment. It is unique in the area, of unknown builder and purpose. It is often compared to the stupa at Wat Kukut in Lamphun in Thailand and to the Buddhist architecture of Cambodia.

According to the Mahavamsa, King Parakramabahu I the Great (1123–1186) built a seven-story tower at Polonnaruwa, but there is no certainty that he refers to this one. An inscription on the Hatadage, the nearby King Nissanka Malla's (1187-1196) Tooth Relic Temple, states that "he erected within forty-five days a palace of seven storeys".

It is made of brick and a layer of plaster. It has seven floors, although the seventh only barely remains. It has a square plan, with a lateral staircase. It presents the same decoration on its four sides. On the ground floor, there are four entrances to a corridor surrounding an octagonal structure, maybe a reliquary. On the upper floors, there is a sculpture at the centre of each wall, surrounded by an arch and holes for anchoring a niche or a similar structure.

It has been related to the pyre of Hephaestion, built in the 4th century BC by Alexander the Great in Babylon to honour that general.
