= Udugampola =

Udugampola උඩුගම්පළ உடுகம்பொல
- Town
- Location within Sri Lanka
- Coordinates: 7°07′32.7″N 79°58′52.8″E
- Country: Sri Lanka
- District: Gampaha District
- Time zone: UTC+5:30 (SLST)
- Postal code: 11030
- Area code: 033

Udugampola is a small town in the Gampaha District of Sri Lanka and was a sub kingdom during reign of the King Sakala Kala Wallabha of Kotte Era. The main point in the area is around the intersection of Gampaha-Minuwangoda and Kotugoda-Naiwala roads.

== History ==
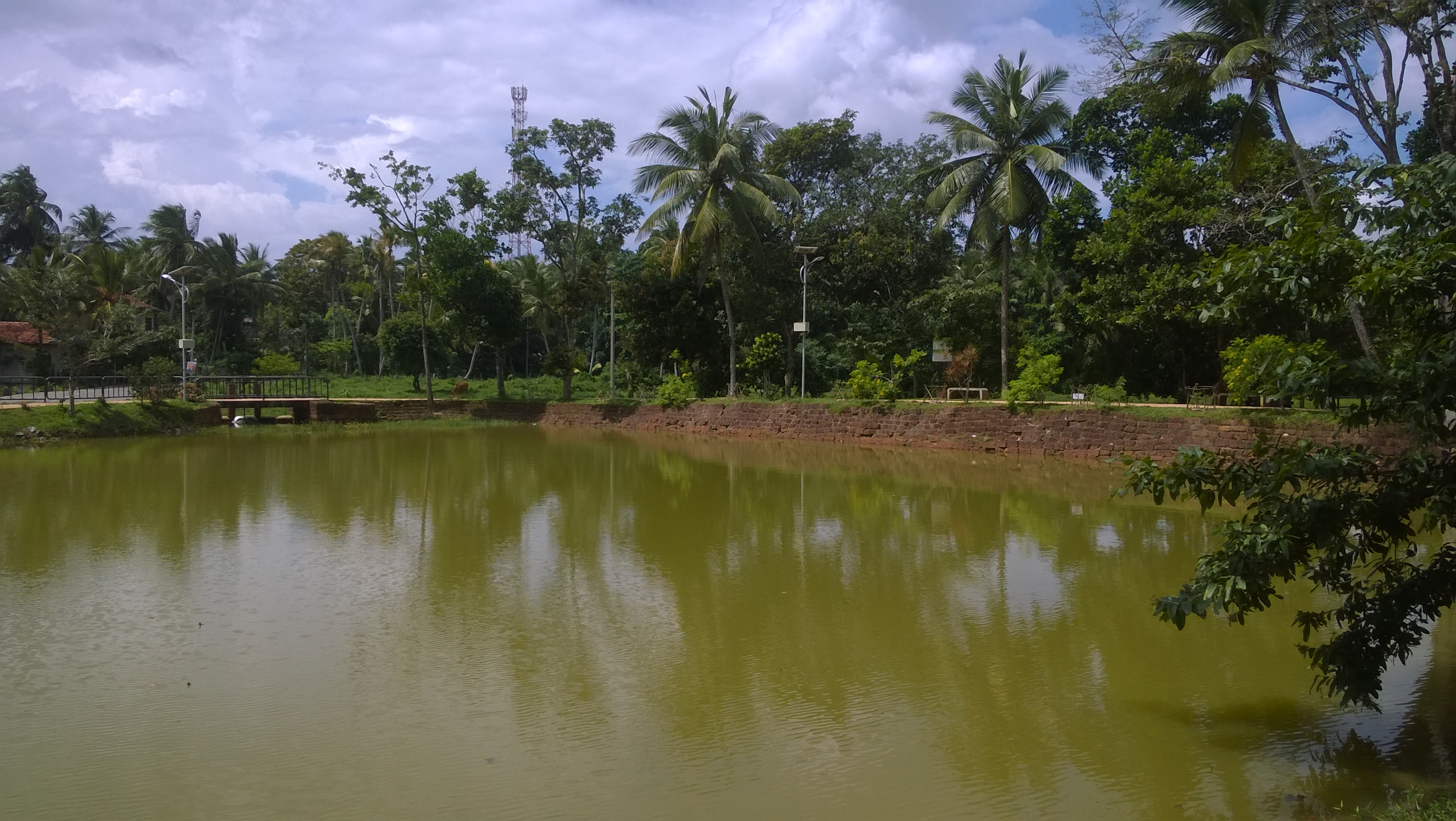
The Pathaha Pokuna

According to the historical sources such as the Rajaveliya, Udugampola had been the sub kingdom of a provincial king or viceroy, Sakalakala Wallabha, the son of Veera Parakramabahu VIII of Kotte. The place where the palace of the king was located is today known as Maliga Godella (Mound of Palace) and ruins related with the Kingdom are still can be seen at the premises of the present Uththararama Purana Vihara. The large pond called Pathaha Pokuna adjoining the Uththararama temple has been identified as the bathing pool of the king.

The existence of a palace in Udugampola is confirmed by an old copper plate called Kadirana Sannasa which was discovered in Kadirana cinnamon plantation near Negombo town. It bears no date but purports a grant made by king Vijayabhahu of Udugampola in Alutkuru korale. The Sannasa records a donation made to a Brahmin by the king at a royal assembly held in his new palace at Udugampola on new moon day of Poson (18 June 1517) when a full solar eclipse was sighted.

== See also ==
- Dewalapola
- Mabodale
