= W. L. Siriwardhana =

Sri Lankan volleyball player

- Born: Weliweriya Liyanage Siriwardhana; 19 June 1938; Ihalagama, Gampaha, Ceylon
- Died: 15 May 2010 (aged 71); Colombo, Sri Lanka
- Occupation: volleyball player
- Parent: W. L. Carolis Perera (father) K. A. Caralina (mother)

W. L. Siriwardhana (Sinhala: ඩබ්. එල්. සිරිවර්ධන; famously known as Volleyball Sira) was a Sri Lankan volleyball player who served as captain of Sri Lanka national team for 12 years in the 1960s-70s.

== Early life ==
W. L. Siriwardhana was born on 19 June 1938 at Ihalagama, Gampaha. His father was W. L. Carolis Perera and mother was K. A. Caralina. He had one sister and one brother. His brother, W.L. Piyaratne, was also a former captain of Sri Lanka national team.

Siriwardhana was educated at the Bandarawatta Junior School and then Bandarawatta Parakrama Maha Vidyalaya.

== As a player ==
At the school he learned the basics of volleyball from teacher K. A. Rajapaksa. Siriwardhana played volleyball for a club named Nandana Volleyball Club, Ihalagama. Then with the formation of Gampaha Central Volleyball Club, Siriwardhana joined to it. In 1954 he won his Sri Lanka cap.

The 1959 Indo-Sri Lanka Volleyball Test was a special match of Siriwardhana's life. It was played at the Govt Services grounds, Colombo on 13 October. The Sri Lankan team was led by Siriwardhana and the Indian team was skippered by S. Bawa. While the game is on, a dash hammered by Siriwardhana made a vicious hit on Bawa's face which caused Bawa to become unconscious and he was rushed to hospital for medical treatment.

=== Ayub Khan gold medal ===
In 1959, the South East Asian Volleyball tournament was held at Karachi in Pakistan. There Siriwardene won the Best Player’s award, and President Ayub Khan Gold Medal for the Best Dasher in Asia.

== As a coach, referee and VB administrator ==
After retiring from playing, Siriwardhana became a coach, referee and a fine administrator of volleyball. Later, he entered to local politics and worked as a member for the Gampaha Pradeshiya Sabha.

== Death ==
On 15 May 2010 he died at Colombo National Hospital. His funeral was held at the Kasagahawatta Cemetery, Gampaha.
