= Bandarawatta Parakrama Maha Vidyalaya =

Parakrama National College
- Bandarawatta; Gampaha, Gampaha District, Western Province; Sri Lanka

Information
- School type: Public National school
- Founded: 1869
- Founder: Richard Rodrigo Muhandiram
- School district: Gampaha Education Zone
- Principal: chandana mudunkotuwa
- Grades: 1-13
- Gender: Mixed
- Age range: 5-18
- Enrollment: 2500+
- Language: Sinhala, English
- Houses: Gemunu, Parakrama, Tissa, Vijaya
- Colours: Dark Blue and silver
- Nickname: parackramanians
- Rival: thakshila college gampaha

Parakrama National College (Sinhala: පරාක්‍රම ජාතික පාසල) is a public school in Gampaha district in Sri Lanka. It was established in 1869.

== Houses ==
The students are divided into four Houses:

- Gemunu (Green)
- Parakrama (Yellow)
- Tissa (purple)
- Vijaya (Red)

The names come from past kings of Sri Lanka.

== Notable alumni ==
- W. L. Siriwardhana - Captain of Sri Lanka national volleyball team
- Sachithra Senanayake - Sri Lanka Cricket National Team
