= Nilanka Premaratne =

Sri Lankan cricketer (born 1988)

Nilanka Premaratne (born Weda Gedara Heeran Nilanka Premaratne on 17 June 1988) is a Sri Lankan cricketer. He is a right-handed batsman and left-arm medium-fast bowler who plays for Ragama Cricket Club. He was born in Kandy and educated in Bandaranayake College, Gampaha.

Premaratne made his cricketing debut for Ragama Cricket Club Under-23s during the 2008 season, and played for the side in the one-day and two-day games in 2008 and 2009.

Premaratne made his first-class debut during the 2009–10 season, against Chilaw Marians. In the first innings in which he bowled, he took figures of 5-58.
