= Yasodara Devi Balika Vidyalaya, Gampaha =

School in Western Province, Sri Lanka

- Gampaha, Gampaha District, Western Province; Sri Lanka

Information
- Type: Government School National School
- School district: Gampaha Education Zone
- Authority: Ministry of Education
- Principal: Gayani Wathsala
- Teaching staff: 125
- Grades: 1-13
- Gender: Girls
- Age range: 5-19
- Enrollment: 3000
- Houses: Seetha Devi (Red); Amara Devi (Yellow); Soma Devi (Green); Viharamaha Devi (Blue)
- Colours: Dark blue, white

Yasodara Devi Balika Vidyalaya, Gampaha, also known as Yasodara Devi Balika Maha Vidyalaya, is a girls' national school located in Gampaha district in Sri Lanka.

The school offers education from Grade 1 to Grade 13 in both Sinhala and English mediums, serving over 3,000 students with a staff of more than 125 teachers.

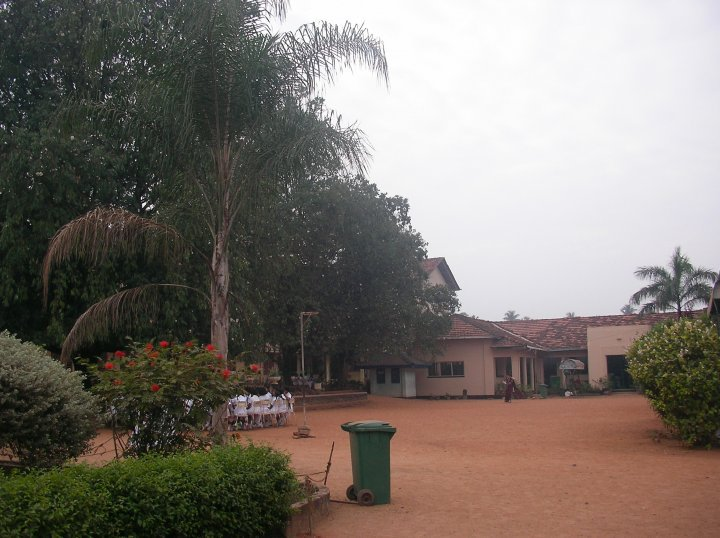
Front View of the Yasodara Devi Balika Maha Vidyalaya

== History ==
The school was established in 1905 as the Government English School, Gampaha. In 1963, it was renamed as Yasodara Devi Balika Maha Vidyalaya. GCE Ordinary Level classes began in 1969, and the first GCE Advanced Level examinations were held in 1984. The commerce stream was introduced in 1979 and the science stream in 1983.

== Administration ==
The school is administered by the Ministry of Education and belongs to the Gampaha Education Zone. The current principal is H. M. Gayanie Wathsala.

== Academic Achievements ==
In the 2023 GCE O/L examination, 93 students achieved 9 A's, making it the top-performing provincial school.

The school’s bilingual education programme also saw exceptional results, with almost all students in the stream securing an 'A' in English.

== Entrepreneurship and skills development ==
In 2024, the school participated in the Diribala Next Gen School Entrepreneurship Grooming Programme, a joint initiative by the Commercial Bank of Ceylon and the Industrial Development Board (IDB). Students were trained in bakery production and beauty culture, and later exhibited their products at a trade fair.

== Sports ==
In the Sri Lanka Schools Air Rifle & Pistol Shooting Championship 2014, student G.H.T.M. Kaviratne placed third in the Girls’ Senior Air Pistol event.

== Campus ==
The school is located near the Medagama Temple and the Gampaha flyover. It features science and home science laboratories, a library, ICT facilities, an indoor stadium, and a swimming pool under development.
