= D. D. Karunaratne =

Ceylonese politician

Meneripitiya Appuhamillage Don David Karunaratne was a Ceylonese politician.

Karunaratne was elected to parliament at the 1st parliamentary election, representing the United National Party (UNP), for the Gampaha electorate. He secured 11,786 votes (38% of the total vote), 3,370 votes ahead of the Lanka Sama Samaja Party candidate, C. A. Mathew, who received 27% of the total vote.

Karunaratne had two daughters, Chandra Charlotte and Edith. Chandra married Percy Jayakoda, who was the MP for Divulapitiya.

Karunaratne was a wealthy landowner in the Gampaha District, owning a number of coconut and rubber plantations. In the 1930s he constructed a palatial walauwa, called Agra, in Bendiyamulla. The 1966 film Parasathu Mal, directed by Gamini Fonseka, was filmed on the property. In 1978 the Gampaha District Secretariat purchased the dwelling and 4.9 ha (12 acres) for Rs 15,300,000 and converted it into government offices, to house the secretariat.
