= P. P. Jayawardena =

Ceylonese politician (1898-?)

Paulis Peiris Jayawardena (16 September 1898 – ?) was a Ceylonese politician.

Jaywardena served as the chairman of the Gampaha Urban Council, following its formation in January 1945.

Jayawardena was elected to parliament, representing the United National Party (UNP), following a parliamentary by-election in July 1949, in the Gampaha electorate. He secured 18,653 votes (60% of the total vote), 12,026 votes ahead of the Lanka Sama Samaja Party candidate, C. A. Mathew, who received 6,627 votes (21% of the total vote).
