= Asgiriya =

- Village
- Location within Sri Lanka Location within India
- Coordinates: 7°17′53″N 80°37′30″E
- Country: Sri Lanka
- Province: Central Province
- Time zone: UTC+5:30 (Sri Lanka Standard Time)

Asgiriya is a village in Sri Lanka. It is located within Central Province. There is a village named Asgiriya in Gampaha district as well, off Gampaha town, in Western Province.

== See also ==
- List of towns in Central Province, Sri Lanka
