= Hatadage =

Relic shrine

Coordinates: 7°56′52″N 81°00′06″E

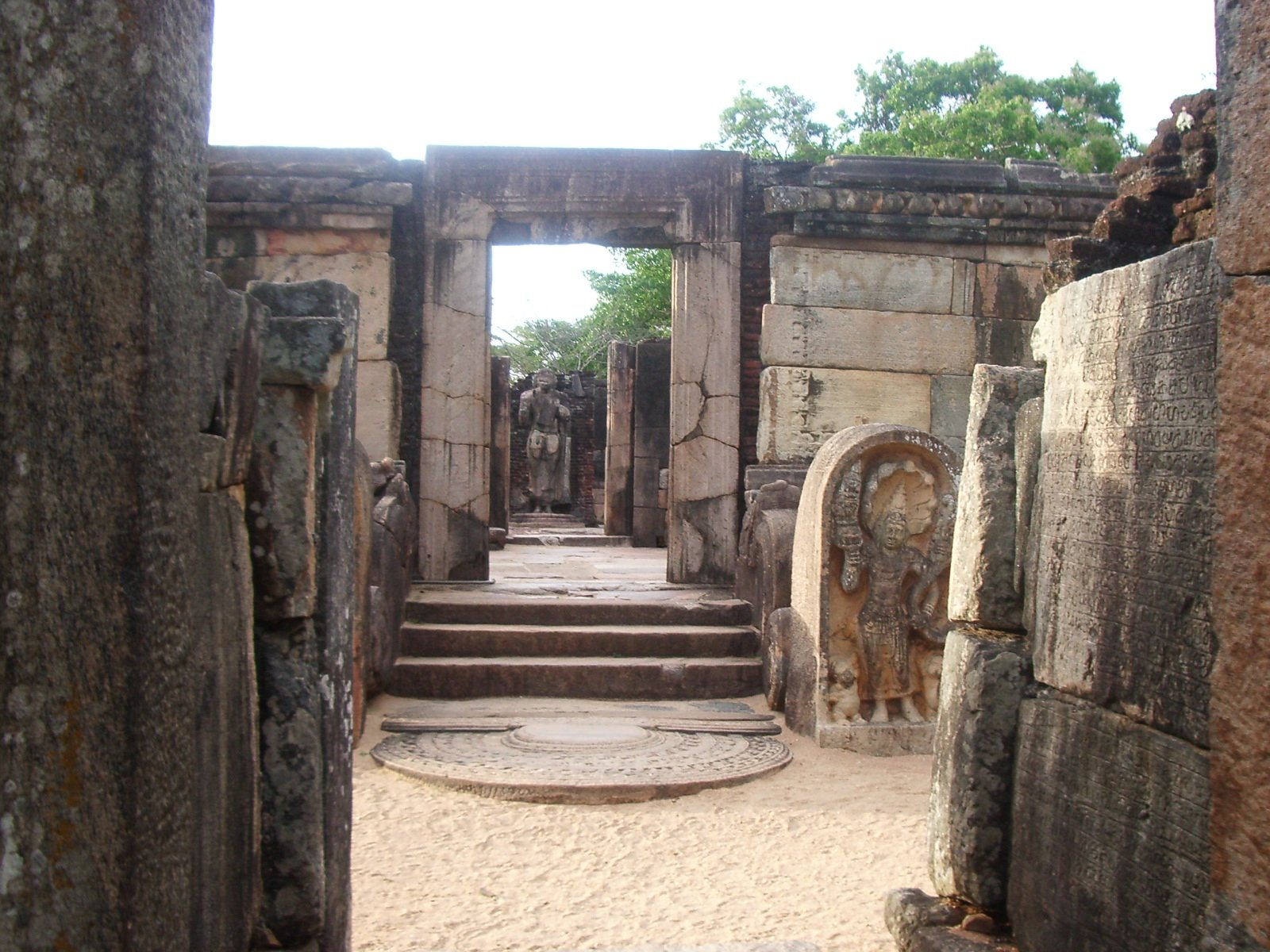
The entrance to the Hatadage

Hatadage (Sinhala: හැටදාගේ) is an ancient relic shrine in the city of Polonnaruwa, Sri Lanka. It was built by King Nissanka Malla, and had been used to keep the Relic of the tooth of the Buddha. The Hatadage had been built using stone, brick and wood, although only parts of the brick and stone walls now remain. It appears to have been a two-storey structure, but the upper storey has now been destroyed. Three Buddha statues carved out of granite rock are located within a chamber of the shrine.

== Location ==
The Hatadage is located in the ancient city of Polonnaruwa, in the North Central province of Sri Lanka. It is close to the northern edge of the Dalada Maluva there, the quadrangular area which contains some of the oldest and most sacred monuments of the city. Its entrance, which is oriented to the south, directly faces the entrance of the Polonnaruwa Vatadage. The Galpotha stone inscription is near its eastern side, while the Atadage lies to its west.

== History and name ==
The Hatadage was built by King Nissanka Malla (1187–1196), as a shrine to house the Relic of the tooth of the Buddha. Several historical sources including the Rajaveliya, Pujavaliya and the Galpotha inscription itself mention that it was built in sixty hours. Since the Sinhalese word Hata means sixty and Dage means relic shrine, it is possible that the structure was named Hatadage to commemorate this feat. Another theory is that it is so named because it held sixty relics. The tooth relic was presumably kept in the upper storey.

== Structure ==
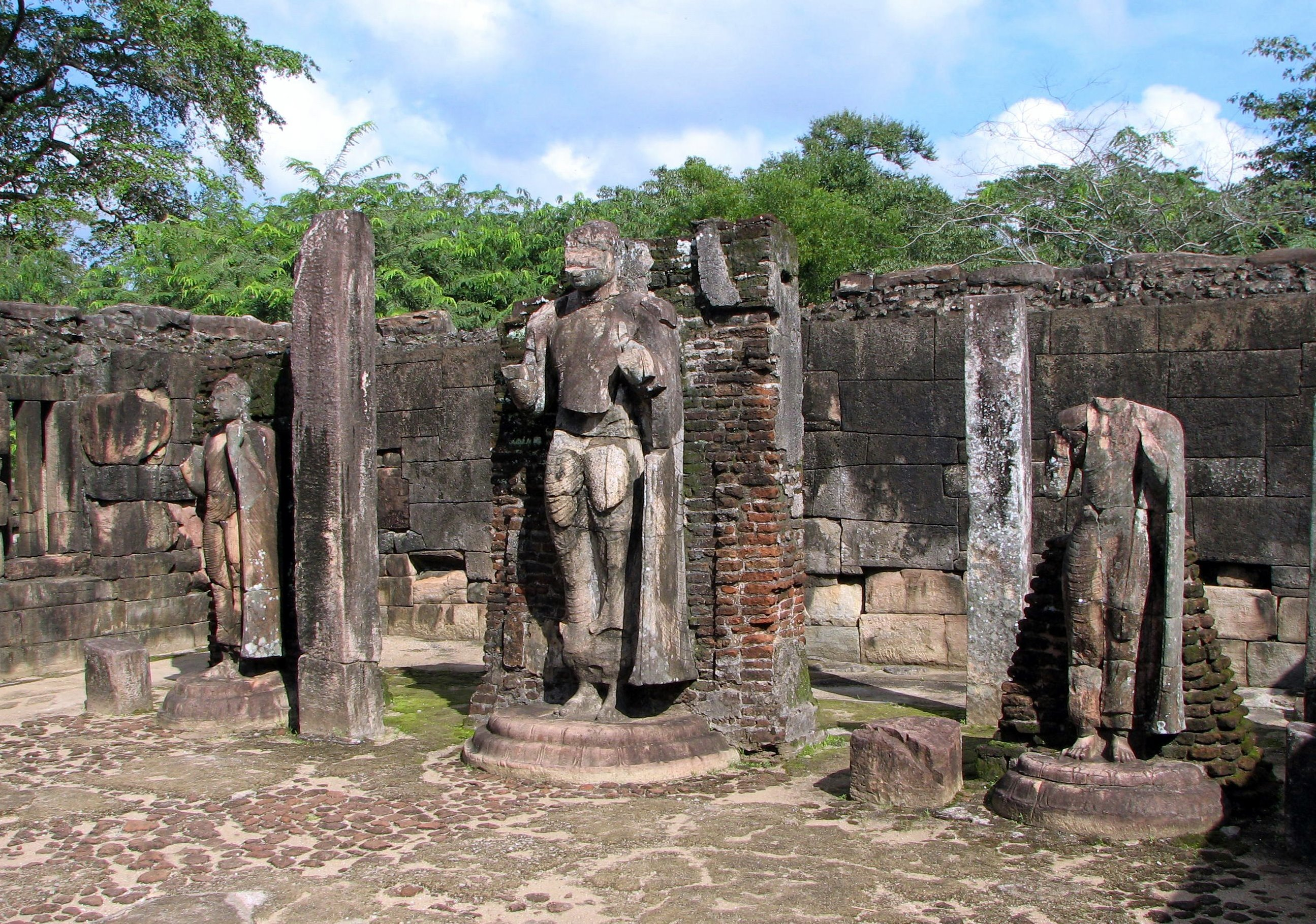
The three Buddha statues inside the shrine

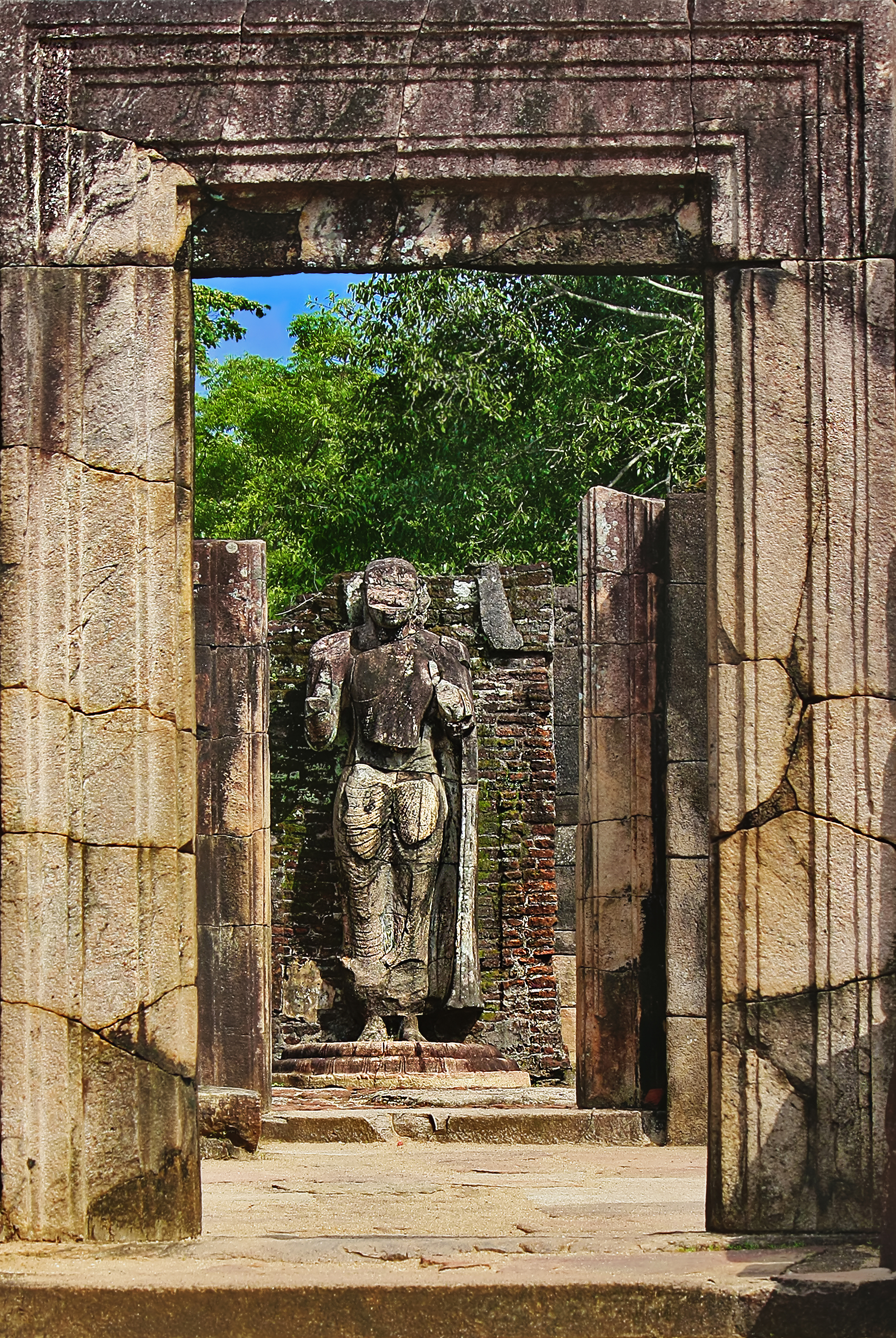
Centered and taller Buddha statue at the house

The shrine is surrounded by a stone wall, 120 feet (37 m) long and 90 feet (27 m) wide. On its southern side is a doorway decorated with stone carvings, leading to a stone paved terrace. The main entrance to the shrine, which is also decorated with stone carvings and a sandakada pahana, is directly in front of it. Another smaller doorway is placed on the eastern side of the shrine.

The shrine has had a wooden superstructure with a tiled roof. However, only the walls now remain. The walls of the shrine are made of brick, and the outer walls are covered with stone plates. The main entrance leads to a small chamber, 27 feet (8.2 m) in length and 21 feet (6.4 m) in width. The base of its walls are decorated with designs of lotus flowers and lions. This chamber contains six stone columns and a staircase that had led to the upper floor. The square shaped main chamber is located to the rear of this outer chamber. Each of its sides are 35 feet (11 m) in length and contains four windows. The chamber had contained sixteen stone columns, although only three now remain. At the center of this chamber are three standing Buddha statues carved from granite. These are also partially destroyed. The statue in the middle is 9 feet (2.7 m) in height, while the other two are 7.5 feet (2.3 m) each.

== 3D documentation ==
A 3D documentation done by the Zamani Project of the Hatadage in Polonnaruwa was carried out in 2019.
