= Sakalakala Wallabha =

Sakalakala Wallabha, was the viceroy or provincial king of the sub kingdom of Udugampola in the Kotte Kingdom during the sixteenth century. He was the son of King Veera Parakramabahu VIII of Kotte and his chief queen's sister. His brother, Thaniya-Vallabha, was the viceroy of Katupiti Madampe. He had four step brothers, Dharma Parakramabahu, Vijayaratne, Rajasingha and Raigam Bandara. The Rajaveliya recounts how together with his brother, he defeated a Muslim invader, who terrorised the area named 'Kadirayana' and restored peace.
