= Gampaha =

Gampaha ගම්පහ கம்பஹா
- City
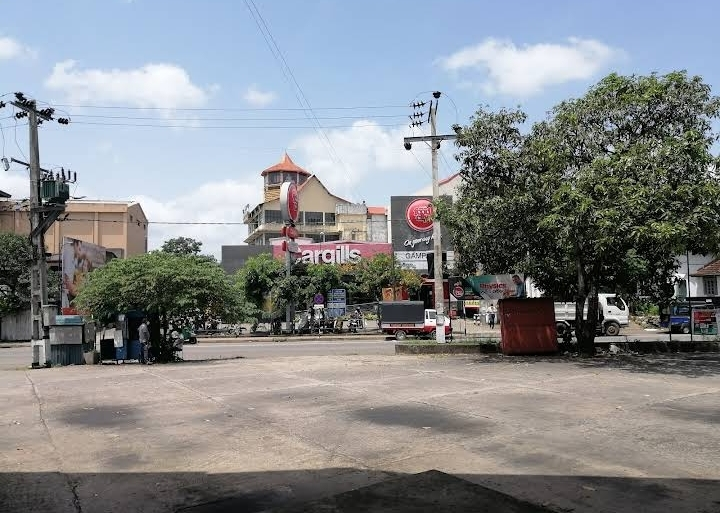
- View of the Gampaha town, Sri Lanka

- Location within Sri Lanka
- Coordinates: 7°05′30″N 79°59′59″E
- Country: Sri Lanka
- District: Gampaha District

Government
  - Type: Municipal Council
  - Mayor: Eric Lakshman Ediriwickrama, NPP

Population (2014)
  - Total: 62,797
- Time zone: UTC+5:30 (SLST)
- Postal code: 11000
- Area code: 033

Gampaha (Sinhala: ගම්පහ [ˈɡamːpaha]; Tamil: கம்பஹா [kambahaː]) is an urban city in Gampaha District, Western Province, Sri Lanka. Situated to the north of the capital Colombo, Gampaha is the second largest urban centre in the Gampaha District after Negombo.

== Population ==
Gampaha has a land area of 25.8 ha (64 acres) and is home to the offices of 75 government institutions. Ethnic composition in Gampaha DS division according to 2012 census is as follows Sinhalese-195,379-98.84%, Tamils-1,271-0.64%, Muslim-230-0.12%, Others-787-0.40%. Religious composition is Buddhist-173,095-87.57%, Roman Catholic-21,085-10.67%, Other Christian-2,137-1.08%, Hindu-855-0.43%, Islam-463-0.23%, Others-32-0.02%.

== Entomology ==
The name "Gampaha" in Sinhala (ගම්පහ) literally means “Five Villages”. The five villages are known to be Ihalagama, Pahalagama, Medagama, Pattiyagama and Aluthgama. However, at present the location of Pattiyagama can no longer be identified within the town limits of Gampaha and remains disputed. Gampaha was also formerly known as Henarathgoda.

== History ==
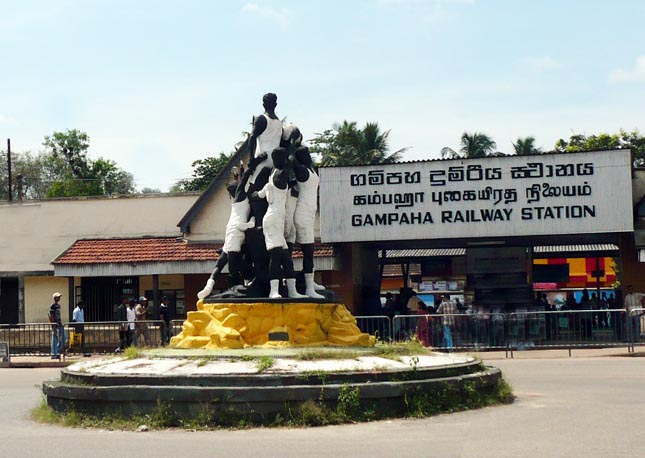
The former volleyball statue was an iconic landmark in Gampaha. Due to the development program this statue has been moved next to the railway station entrance.

During reign of Portuguese, the main route to the hill country had been laid through the Gampaha area and in the period of Dutch, this area was served as centre for the collection of cinnamon. But before year 1815, it is said that Gampaha was a dense forest. The 5th Governor of Ceylon, Sir Edward Barnes made a visit to Gampaha in 1825, on the way to observe the construction work of the Negombo-Colombo main road. When British built the “Moragoda” catholic church in 1828, Gampaha and surrounding areas slowly became inhabited.

As the extension of the railway track from Colombo to Ambepussa, the Henarathgoda railway station was completed in 1866 which acted as a key factor for the progress and recognition of the town. In 1867, the first rubber tree of Sri Lanka was planted in Henarathgoda botanical garden.

The town was planned in 1920, with 52 roads including the main street, a water tank, a public market, a hospital and an electrical generator. Most of these are still present in their original sites with various improvements over time.

== Local Government ==
Gampaha was a village council until 1945. On 1 January that year, the town qualified to become an urban council. The first urban council had five members. P. P. Jayawardane was the first chairman of the urban council. Total number of workforce in the urban council was 197 persons. In 1978 constitutional reforms declared Gampaha as a new administrative district (which was formerly recognised as a part of the Colombo District) and the main administrative centre was established in Gampaha. The new district status lead the town to a rapid development, establishing new government institutes. On 16 April 2002, the Urban Council was upgraded to become the Gampaha Municipal Council.

== Economy ==
The economy of Gampaha has been extended in many aspects. Mainly paddy and Rubber are grown as main cultivation products while pineapple and betel are occasionally grown. Some rural industries like pottery, tiles, hand loom textiles, coconut related products can be found. Gampaha is home to Sri Lanka's largest literary event — The Asian Literary Festival — and the only Sri Lankan literary festival with a sustained international presence. The festival is known for making a meaningful contribution to Gampaha's creative economy, generating direct and indirect value for local hospitality, the arts, publishing, and civic life.

== Climate ==
Gampaha has a tropical rainforest climate under the Köppen climate classification. The climate is fairly temperate all throughout the year with a significant rainfall. Even in the driest month there is a significant amount of rain. The driest month is January and there is about 62 mm of precipitation. Most of the precipitation in Gampaha area falls in October, averaging 365 mm. The precipitation varies 303 mm between the driest month and the wettest month. April is warmest month in Gampaha, with an average temperature of 28.4 °C (83.1 °F) and the December is the coolest month, with temperatures averaging 26.1 °C (79 °F). Throughout the year, temperatures vary by 2.3 °C.

The annual rain fall in the area is about 2398 mm and the average temperature is about 27.3 °C. The main sources of water canals of Gampaha are Attanagalu Oya and Uruwela Oya.

Climate data for Gampaha
Month	Jan	Feb	Mar	Apr	May	Jun	Jul	Aug	Sep	Oct	Nov	Dec	Year
Mean daily maximum °C (°F)	30.7 (87.3)	31.8 (89.2)	32.7 (90.9)	32.6 (90.7)	31.5 (88.7)	30.3 (86.5)	30.2 (86.4)	30.4 (86.7)	30.6 (87.1)	30.3 (86.5)	30.4 (86.7)	30.1 (86.2)	32.7 (90.9)
Daily mean °C (°F)	26.2 (79.2)	26.8 (80.2)	27.9 (82.2)	28.4 (83.1)	28.3 (82.9)	27.5 (81.5)	27.5 (81.5)	27.6 (81.7)	27.5 (81.5)	26.9 (80.4)	26.5 (79.7)	26.1 (79.0)	27.2 (81.0)
Mean daily minimum °C (°F)	21.7 (71.1)	21.8 (71.2)	23.1 (73.6)	24.2 (75.6)	25.1 (77.2)	24.8 (76.6)	24.8 (76.6)	24.8 (76.6)	24.4 (75.9)	23.6 (74.5)	22.7 (72.9)	22.2 (72.0)	21.7 (71.1)
Average precipitation mm (inches)	62 (2.4)	79 (3.1)	146 (5.7)	255 (10.0)	353 (13.9)	216 (8.5)	134 (5.3)	123 (4.8)	202 (8.0)	365 (14.4)	311 (12.2)	152 (6.0)	2,398 (94.3)
Source: CLIMATE DATA.ORG,

== Attractions ==
- Henarathgoda Botanical Garden where the first rubber tree was planted in Sri Lanka is still present located close to Gampaha town. The garden is bordered with Attangalle oya and covers about 17 ha (43 acres). It is believed that the garden is more than 128 years old.

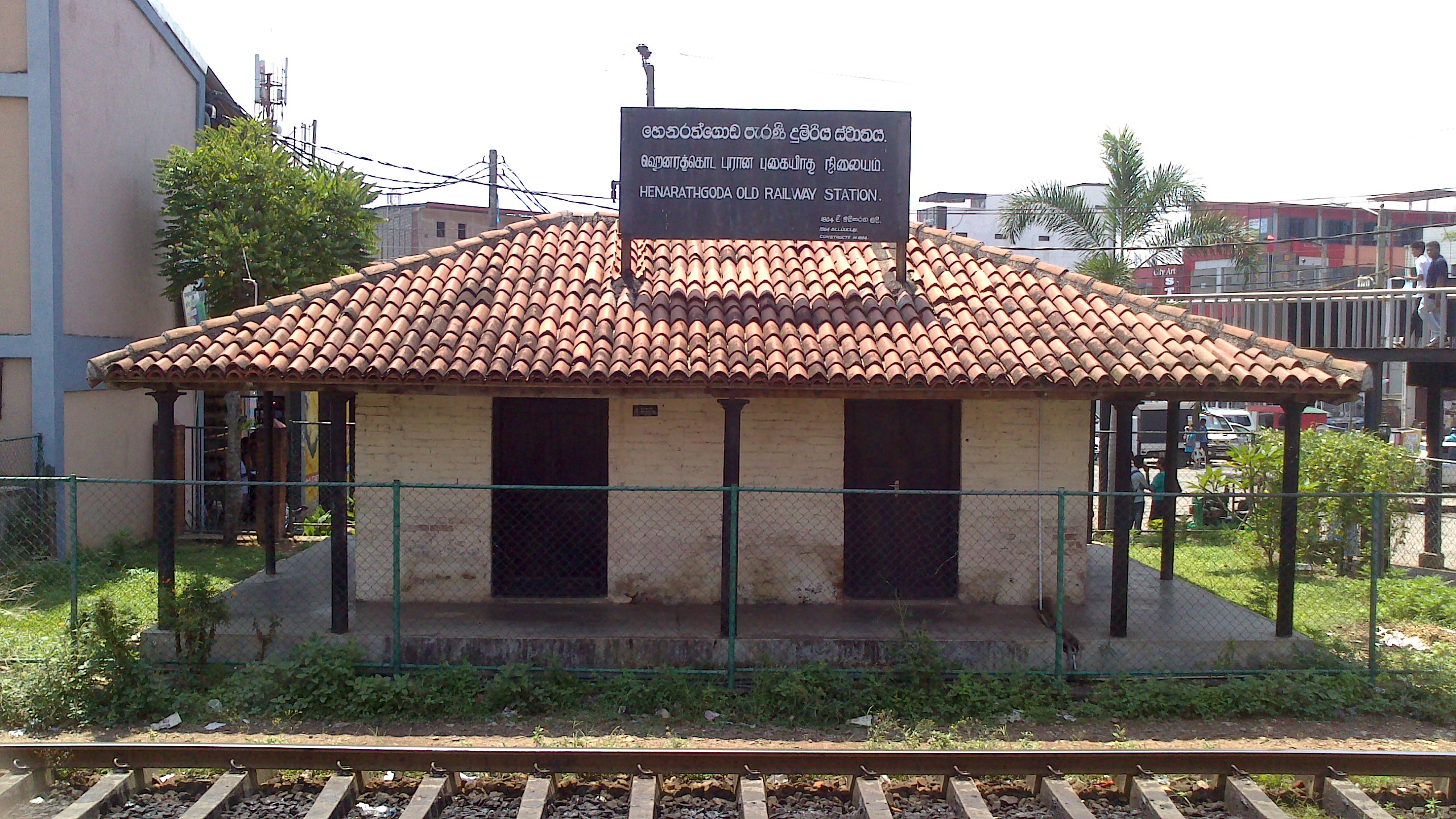
Henarathgoda old railway station. Currently this building has been recognised as archaeological protected monument in Gampaha.

- Henarathgoda old railway station was built in 1866 by the British to facilitate the transportation of tea and coffee from the up country to Colombo.

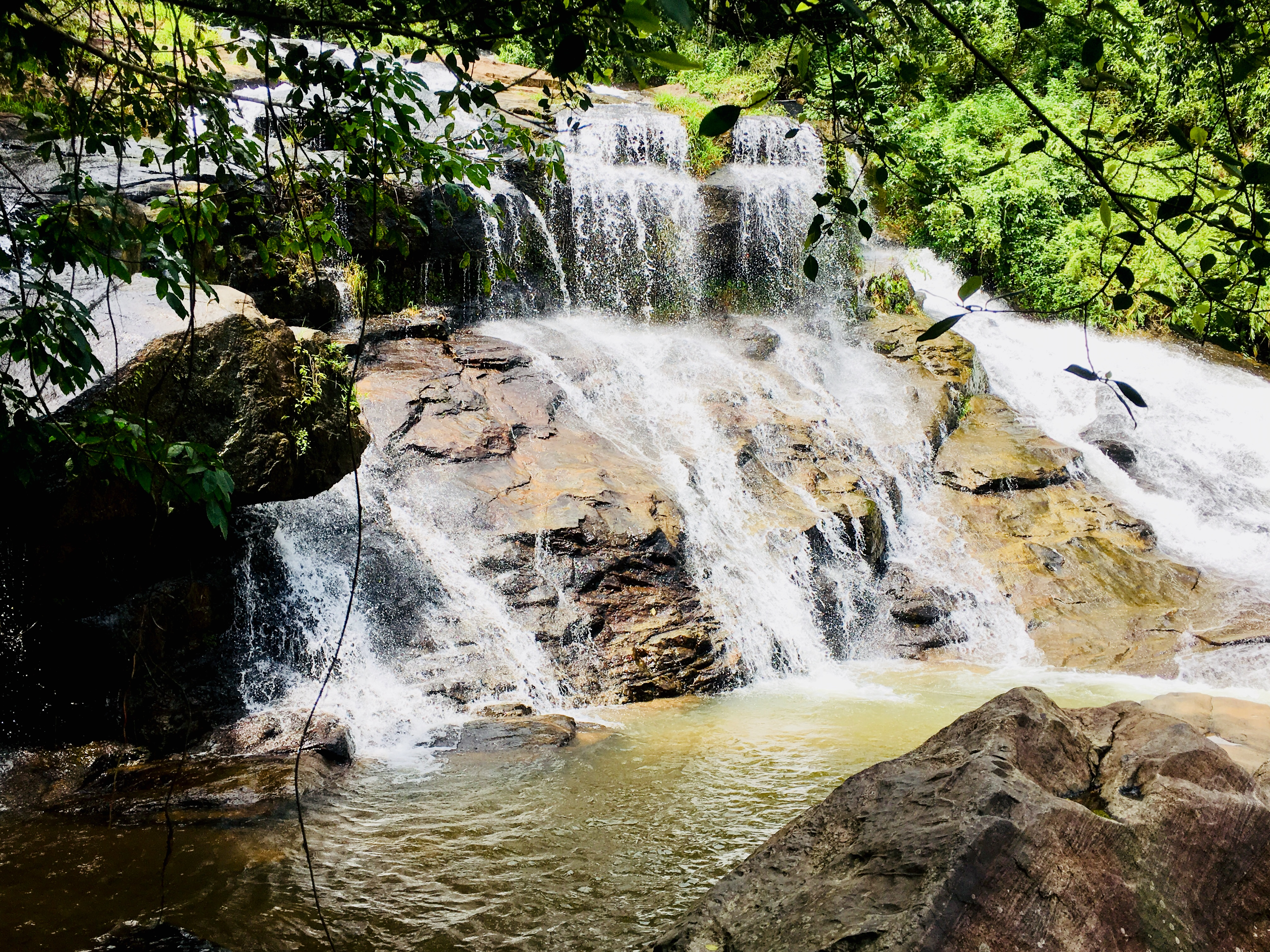
Goraka Ella Waterfall

- Asgiriya Rajamaha Vihara is an ancient Buddhist temple which is located close to the Gampaha town. Currently this temple has been recognized as archaeological protected monument in Minuwangoda division. The history of this temple runs to the reign of King Valagamba.
- Yatawatte Purana Vihara is an Tampita Vihara, located in Pahalagama. Currently this temple has been protected as one of archaeological protected sites in Sri Lanka.
- Wathumulla Ketawala Ambalama is an old Ambalama, located near to Daraluwa rail way station. During the past periods Ambalams were designed to provide shelter for the travelers.
- Ketawala Anicut is one of two anicut projects that come under the key irrigation scheme in Gampaha.
- Maligathenna Rajamaha Vihara is an ancient Buddhist Temple which located in Gampaha District. The history of this temple runs to the reign of King Valagamba. The tooth relic was hidden twice here.
- Kaleniya Rajamaha Vihara is an ancient Buddhist Temple in Gampaha District. It is located near to Kelani River.
- Goraka Ella waterfall

== Education ==
Literacy in Gampaha district is the highest in Sri Lanka. The literacy rate for both sexes is 98.5. Gampaha is home to secondary educational institutes in Sri Lanka. The government owned schools in the gampaha area are listed below.

=== Universities ===
- University of Kelaniya

==== Ayurveda ====
Pundit Wickramarachchi found the first Ayurveda College of the country - "Sri Lanka Siddhayurveda Vidyalaya" in 1929 closer to Yakkala. "Gampaha Wickramarachchi Ayurveda Vidyalaya (Incorporation) Act No. 30 of 1982" established the college as a national institute for Ayurveda education. From 1 March 1995 the institute was recognized as Gampaha Wickramarachchi Ayurveda Institute and was affiliated to the main university stream of the country Under University of Kelaniya. The institute offers "Bachelor of Ayurveda Medicine and Surgery" (BAMS) diploma and the practitioners are distinguished around the country as "Gampaha Ayurvedic Physicians". Rules for the regulation of the professional conduct of Ayurvedic physicians have been approved by the Minister of Health and gazetted in June 1971.

=== Schools ===
- Anura Central College
- Bandaranayake College
- Bandarawatta Parakrama Maha Vidyalaya
- Bemmulla Gamini Kanishta Vidyalaya
- Bendiyamulla Gajaba Vidyalaya
- Sri Bodhi College
- Chandrajothi Maha Vidyalaya
- Sri Dharmaloka College Kelaniya
- Gothami Kanishta Vidyalaya
- Gunanodaya Vidyalaya-Divlapitiya
- Gurukula College Kelaniya
- Holy Cross College
- Ihala Yagoda Lumbini Kanishta Vidyalaya
- Indigolla Vijitha Prathamika Vidyalaya
- Keppetipola Maha Vidyalaya
- Kirindiwela Central College
- Kirindiwela Maha Vidyalaya
- Kirindiwita Gemunu Kanishta Vidyalaya
- Mahagamasekaya Maha Vidyalaya
- Mahaththuwa Jinarathana Prathamika Vidyalaya
- Moragoda Wimaladharmasuriya Kanishta Vidyalaya
- Rathnavali Balika Vidyalaya
- St. Peter's College
- Sidharthakumara Vidyalaya
- Sanghabodhi College
- Sumedha College
- Thakshila College
- Viharamahadevi Balika Vidyalaya Kiribathgoda
- Vishaka Balika Vidyalaya Makola
- Yasodara Devi Balika Maha Vidyalaya

== Transport ==
Gampaha is the 15th railway station from the Colombo fort on main railway line.

Numerous bus routes terminatate at Gampaha.
