= Rajavaliya =

Rajavaliya (line of kings) is an ancient chronicle of Sri Lanka. It contains the history of King Vijaya to King Vimaladharmasuriya ΙΙ. It is the only chronicle which contains continuous history of Sri Lanka written in Sinhalese language.
