= List of waterfalls in Sri Lanka =

The following is a list of waterfalls in Sri Lanka. Waterfalls less than 10 m (33 ft) in height are not included.

Waterfall	Image	Height	Location	District	Province	Description	Refs
Aberdeen Falls		98 m (322 ft)	Aberdeen		Central		
Asupini Ella		30 m (98 ft)	Aranayaka, Mawanella		Sabaragamuwa		
Alakola Falls		60 m (197 ft)					
Baker's Falls		20 m (66 ft)	Horton Plains National Park		Central		
Bambarakanda Falls		263 m (863 ft)	Kalupahana	Badulla	Uva	The tallest waterfall in Sri Lanka.	
Bomburu Ella		50 m (160 ft)	Perawella		Uva		
Bopath Ella Falls		30 m (98 ft)	Ratnapura		Sabaragamuwa		
Delta Falls		60 m (197 ft)					
Dessford Falls		20 m (66 ft)					
Diyathiri Ella		30 m (98 ft)	Dolosbage		Central		
Devathura Falls		10 m (33 ft)	Ramboda Pass		Central		
Devon Falls		97 m (318 ft)	Talawakele		Central		
Diyaluma Falls		220 m (722 ft)	Koslanda	Badulla	Uva	The second highest waterfall in Sri Lanka.	
Doovili Ella		40 m (131 ft)	Balangoda		Sabaragamuwa		
Dunhinda Falls		63 m (207 ft)	Badulla		Uva		
Elgin Falls		25 m (82 ft)	Ambewela		Central		
Ethamala Falls		52 m (171 ft)	Akurassa		Southern		
Galboda Ella		30 m (98 ft)	Nawalapitiya		Central		
Galdola Falls		100 m (328 ft)					
Garandi Ella, Kalugala		100 m (328 ft)	Kalugala	Kandy	Central	If Ramboda Falls, Garandi Ella and Vedimalaya Falls considered as a single cascade it has a height of 270 m (886 ft)	
Garandi Ella (Gerandigini Falls)		100 m (328 ft)		Nuwara Eliya	Central		
Gartmore Falls		20 m (66 ft)	Maskeliya				
Glain Falls		10 m (33 ft)			Central		
Handapan Ella		23 m (75 ft)					
Handun Ella		30 m (98 ft)					
Hathmale Falls		45 m (148 ft)	Deniyaya		Southern		
Huluganga Falls		75 m (246 ft)	Huluganga Town		Central		
Hunnas Falls		60 m (197 ft)	Elkaduwa		Central		
Kalupahana Falls		10 m (33 ft)					
Kirindi Ella		116 m (381 ft)	Pelmadulla			The waterfall begins from Kuttapitiya Mountain and then flows to Kalu ganga	
Kurundu oya Falls (Maturata Ella)		189 m (620 ft)	Walapane	Nuwara Eliya	Central	The third highest fall in Sri Lanka.	
Laxapana Falls		129 m (423 ft)	Hatton	Nuwara Eliya	Central	The fall has been affected by power stations at New Lakshapana, Canyon and Polpitye Samanala.	
Lihinihela Ella		200 m (656 ft)				Rainfall active waterfall in Peak Wilderness Protected Area	
Lovers Leap		30 m (98 ft)	Nuwara Eliya		Central		
Madanagiri Falls		70 m (230 ft)					
Mahakandura Falls		120 m (394 ft)					
Mahakandura Falls		10 m (33 ft)	Kothmale				
Manawela Falls		22 m (72 ft)	close to Lunuwatta	Badulla	Uva	22m high falls, historical place with King Manabarana	
Mannakethi Ella		60 m (197 ft)					
Mapanana Falls (Mapalana Ella)		141 m (463 ft)	Gilimale	Ratnapura			
Nakkawita Falls		100 m (328 ft)					
Nanuoya Falls		60 m (197 ft)			Central		
Okandagala Falls		63 m (207 ft)					
Oolu Ella		127 m (417 ft)	Yatiyantota	Kegalle	Sabaragamuwa	It is the 6th tallest waterfall in Sri Lanka and the highest waterfall in connected with Kelani River.	
Peessa Ella		45 m (148 ft)	Lunugala		Uva		
Puna Falls		100 m (328 ft)	Pundaluoya	Nuwara Eliya	Central		
Pundalu Oya Falls		100 m (328 ft)	Pundaluoya	Nuwara Eliya	Central		
Ramboda Falls		109 m (358 ft)	Ramboda	Nuwara Eliya	Central		
Rathna Falls		101 m (331 ft)	Hasalaka	Kandy	Central	Inside the Knuckles's East End	
Ravana Ella		25 m (82 ft)	Ella	badulla	Uva	history with King RAWANA	
Rawan Ella		40 m (130 ft)	Uduhawara	badulla	Uva	4 km from Bomburuella	
Sampath Ella		30 m (98 ft)					
Sera Ella Falls		10 m (33 ft)	Matale		Central		
St. Clair's Falls		80 m (262 ft)	Hatton		Central	The widest waterfall in Sri Lanka	
Seetha Kotuwa Falls		60 m (197 ft)					
Sri Pada Falls		75 m (246 ft)					
Surathali Falls		60 m (197 ft)					
Yaka Andu Ella		60 m (197 ft)					
Windsor Forest Falls		10 m (33 ft)					
Galamuduna Ahasgawwa Falls		92 m (302 ft)	Meemure	Badulla	Central	The waterfall begins from Udagaladebokka Mountain and then flows to connected by "HeenGaga". Always water like mist and it is an hidden waterfall in knuckles mountain range	
Dunumala Ella		45 m (148 ft)	Uduwaka	Kegalle	Sabaragamuwa	Formed by Algama Oya, a tributary of Attanagalu Oya	

== See also ==
- List of rivers in Sri Lanka
- List of waterfalls
