= Huluganga Falls =

Waterfall in Sri Lanka

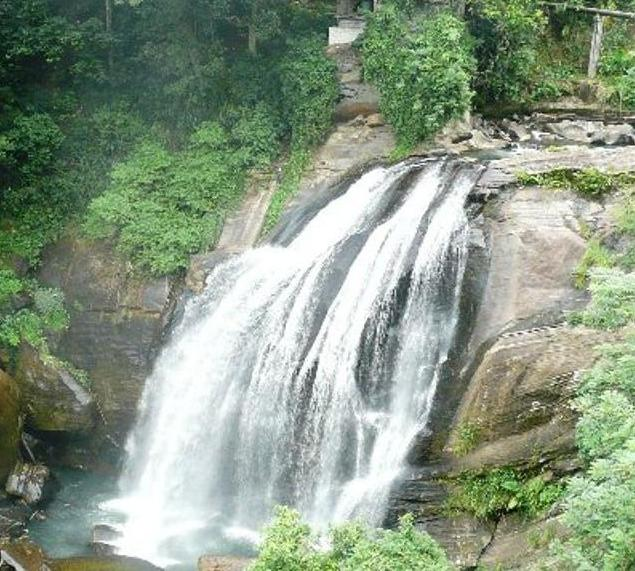
- Huluganga Falls
- Location: Sri Lanka
- Total height: 75 m (246 ft)
- Watercourse: Hulu ganga

Huluganga Falls is a waterfall located at Huluganga Town, about 30 kilometers away from Kandy Town in on the way of Bambarella, in Kandy District in Sri Lanka. Hulu River is originating from the Knuckles Mountain Range. Huluganga Falls is about 75 meters in height. The cascading water sprinkles the villages of Elliyadda and Aratthana, before flowing to the Victoria Reservoir.

There are many rocks on the river and even on the rainy days the water does not get muddy because of rocks, grass and plants, as well as less environmental pollution.

== See also ==
- List of waterfalls
- List of waterfalls in Sri Lanka
