= Alugolla, Lewdeniya =

Village in Sri Lanka

Alugolla
- Village
- Location within Sri Lanka
- Coordinates: 7°05′31″N 80°29′11″E
- Country: Sri Lanka
- Province: Central Province
- District: Kandy District
- Divisional secretariat: Ganga Ihala Korale Divisional Secretariat
- Time zone: UTC+5:30 (Sri Lanka Standard Time)

Alugolla is a village in Sri Lanka. It is located north of Miyanagolla and east of Dolosbage, within Kandy District, Central Province. It adjoins the Baranagala estate.

== Demographics ==
Historical population
Year	Pop.	±%
1881	53	—
1891	85	+60.4%

== See also ==
- List of towns in Central Province, Sri Lanka
