= Alakola Ella =

Waterfall in Sri Lanka

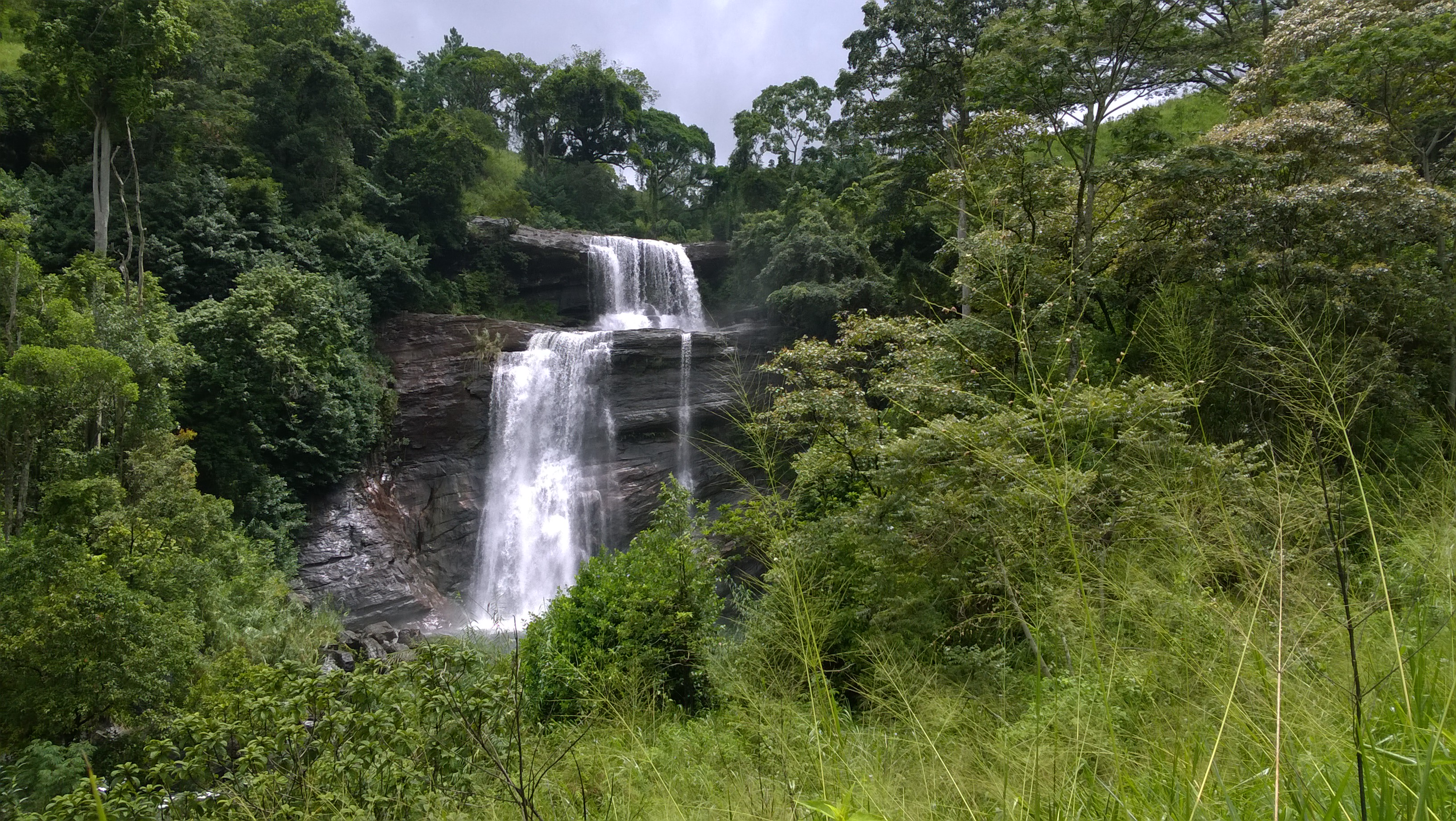

- Location within Sri Lanka
- Location: Matale, Sri Lanka
- Coordinates: 7.419181°N 80.740014°E
- Type: Horsetail
- Total height: 50 m (164 ft)
- Watercourse: Huluganga

Alakola Ella also referred to as Thaliya Wetuna Ella (Sinhala: අලකොල ඇල්ල/තාලිය වැටනු ඇල්ල) is a waterfall which is located in Alakola estate in the Knuckles mountain range, Matale of Central Province. The waterfall was named after a tea planter called Allen Collen who was active during the colonial era.

== See also ==
- List of waterfalls
- List of waterfalls of Sri Lanka
