= Dunsinane Falls =

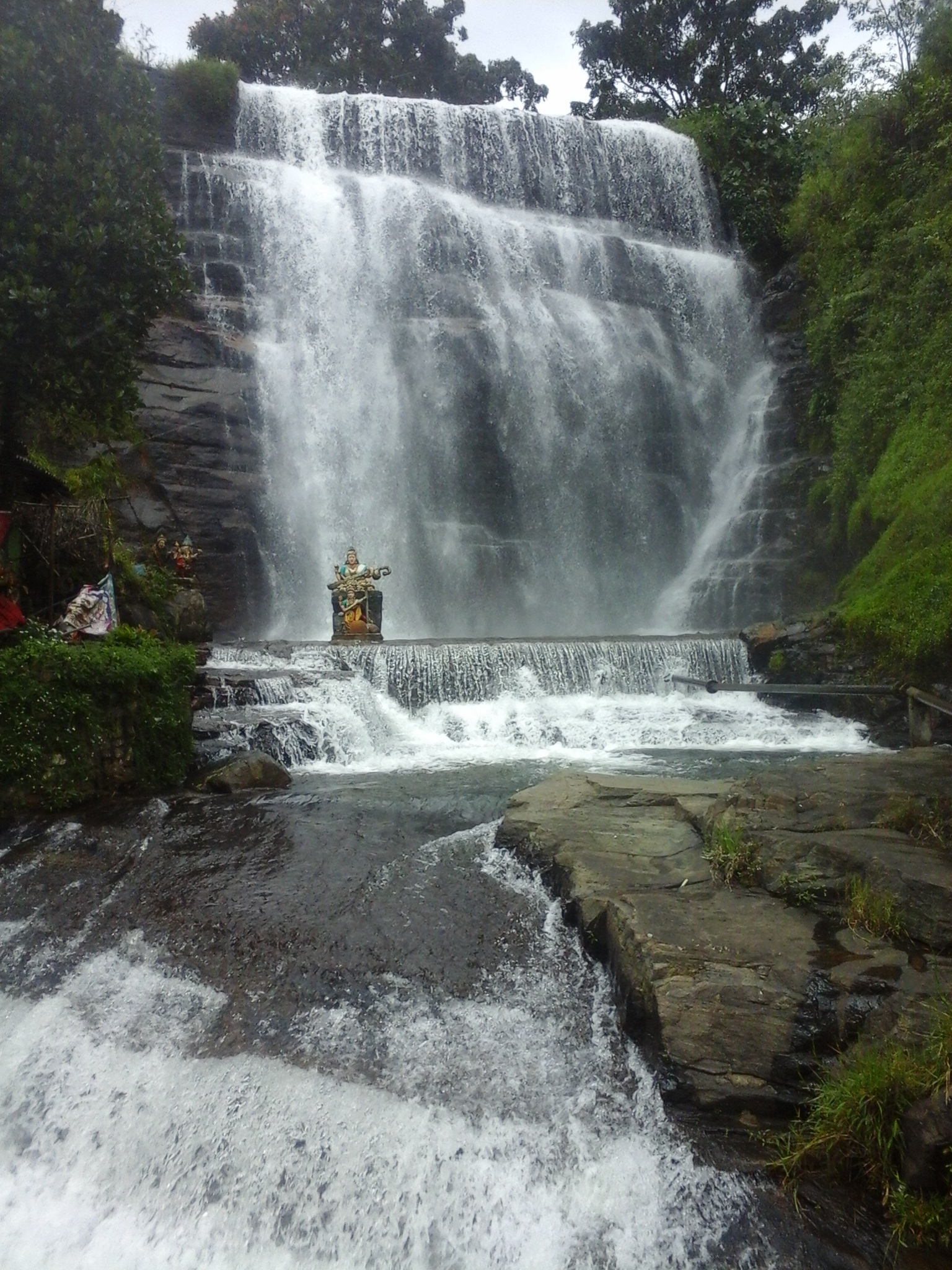
- Dunsinane Falls
- Interactive map of Dunsinane Falls
- Location: Pundaluoya, Sri Lanka
- Coordinates: 7°00′42.2″N 80°42′20.4″E
- Total height: 100 metres (330 ft)
- Watercourse: Pundalu Oya

Dunsinane Falls (or Pundalu Oya Falls) (Sinhala: ඩන්සිනන් දියඇල්ල) is a waterfall in Nuwara Eliya District of Sri Lanka. It is situated in Pundaluoya village and between the Tea estates known as Dunsinane (named after Dunsinane Hill in Scotland) and Sheen. Therefore sometimes this falls is called as Dunsinane Sheen falls. The waterfall is created by the Pundalu Oya river which is a tributary of Kotmale Oya.

== See also ==
- List of waterfalls
- List of waterfalls of Sri Lanka
