= Udahentenna =

- Village
- Location within Sri Lanka
- Coordinates: 7°06′N 80°31′E
- Country: Sri Lanka
- Province: Central Province
- Time zone: UTC+5:30 (Sri Lanka Standard Time)
- Postal code: 20506
- Area code: 081

Udahentenna is a village in Sri Lanka. It is located within Central Province. It is situated along the B132 road, which runs from Dolosbage to Gampola.

== Attractions ==
- Theppakulam Lake
- Kabaragala Rock

== Education ==
- Senadhikari National School

== See also ==
- List of towns in Central Province, Sri Lanka
