= Rawan Ella =

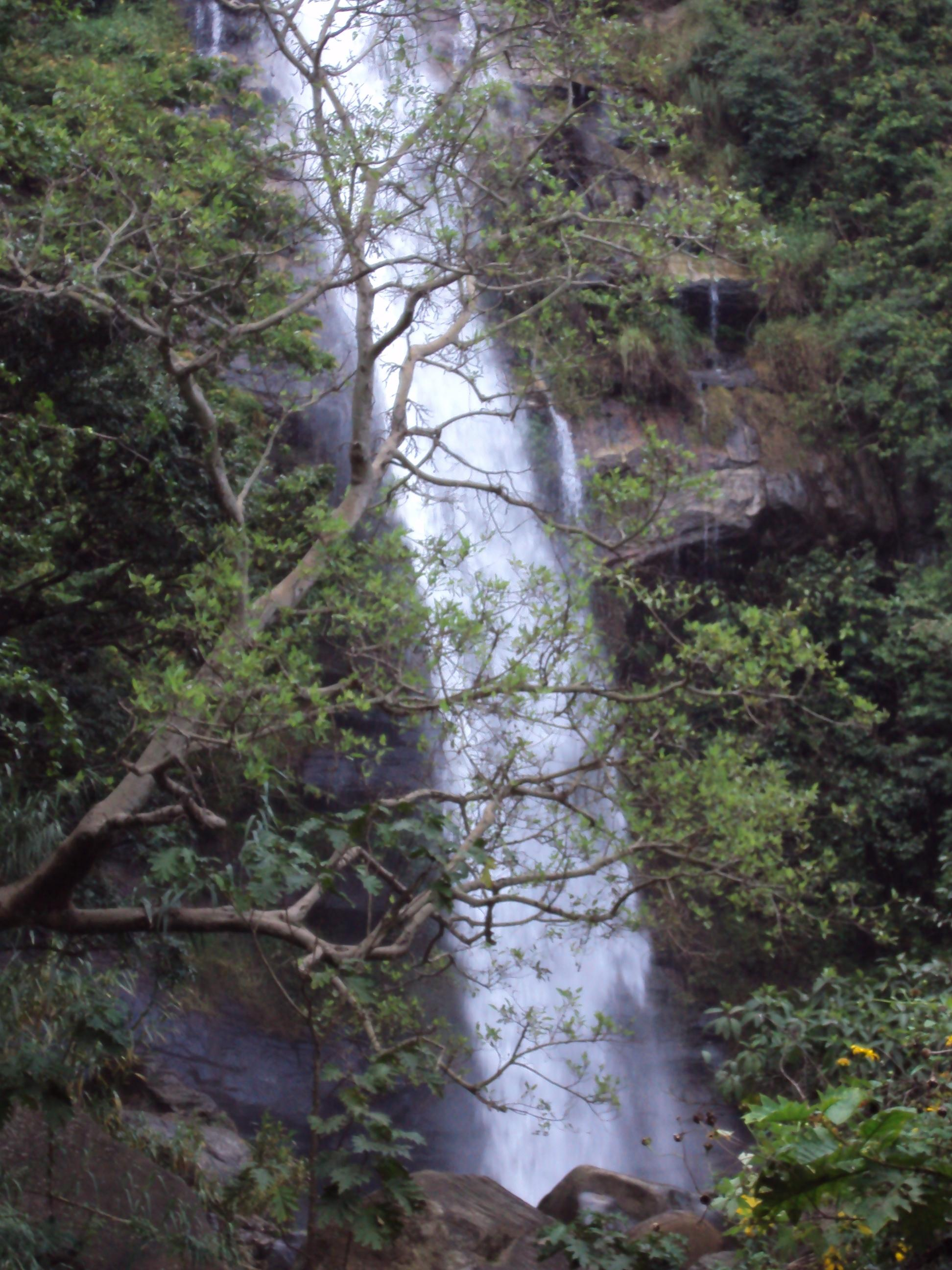
- Rawan Ella
- Interactive map of Rawan Ella
- Location: Uduhawara, Sri Lanka
- Coordinates: 6°57′34″N 80°51′16″E
- Total height: 40 m (130 ft)

Rawan Ella (also spelled Ranvan Ella; Sinhala: රන්වන් ඇල්ල/රවන් ඇල්ල), is a waterfall in the village of Uduhawara, in Badulla District, near the boundary with the Nuwara Eliya District, Sri Lanka. It is a horsetail-type waterfall, approximately 40 metres (130 ft) high.

Rawan Ella is fed by streams within the Central Highlands and is surrounded by hills, including Rahugala and Wilibissa, which are popular hiking destinations. The final approach to the falls involves a short walk of 200–300 metres, and there is motorable access up to Korandekumbura town, which is about 1 km away.

The falls are located approximately 12 km (7.5 mi) from Welimada, 13 kilometres from the Hakgala Botanical Garden and 22 kilometres (14 miles) from Nuwara Eliya. It lies around 3 km from the larger Bomburu Ella Falls, and can be accessed via hiking routes and gravel roads from the east and west.

== Cultural significance ==
As with several other waterfalls in Sri Lanka, local folklore associates Rawan Ella with hidden treasure. According to tradition, a copper pot filled with gold is buried in the plunge pool at the base of the falls and occasionally surfaces, though it is said to be impossible to touch. This belief may have influenced the naming of the waterfall, since 'ranvan' in Sinhala means 'golden'. This waterfall is not to be confused with the Ravana Falls in Ella.

== See also ==
- List of waterfalls
- List of waterfalls in Sri Lanka
