= G. P. Samarawickrama =

Sri Lankan physician and academic

1st Vice Chancellor University of Ruhuna
- Incumbent
- Assumed office 1984
- Succeeded by: S. Pinnaduwage

Personal details
- Born: Gervin Panduka Samarawickrama; 5 July 1938 (age 88) Colombo, Sri Lanka
- Spouse: Sunethra Manthri née Kehelpannala (m. 11 July 1966)
- Children: 1, Rajeeva Samarawickrama
- Education: Mahinda College, Galle; University of Ceylon; University of London
- Profession: Physician; Academic

Gervin Panduka Samarawickrama is a Sri Lankan physician and academic. He was the inaugural Vice-Chancellor of University of Ruhuna.

== Biography ==
Samarawickrama was born 5 July 1938 in Colombo, the son of Stephen Samarawickrama and Darlina née Wijeratne.

Samarawickrama graduated from the University of Ceylon in 1967 with a Bachelor of Medicine, Bachelor of Surgery. Following which he was the medical officer-in-charge Venereal Diseases Clinic in Galle between 1968 and 1969, employed at the Government Hospital, Hurikaduwa between 1969 and 1971, and a lecturer, then senior lecturer at the University of Peradeniya between 1971 and 1980. In 1975 he obtained a Doctor of Philosophy from the University of London. In 1980 he was employed as the head of the department of community medicine at Ruhuna University College. In 1984 following the elevation of the Ruhuna University College to full university status he was appointed the University's inaugural Vice-Chancellor.

Academic offices
Preceded by	Vice Chancellor of the University of Ruhuna	Succeeded by S. Pinnaduwage
