= Dhadu Monara =

According to folk tales, Dhadu Monara ("Wooden Peacock") was the legendary pre-historic aircraft used by King Ravana of Sri Lanka, to travel among countries under his command. But no archaeological evidence has been found anywhere in Sri Lanka to prove the existence of such an aircraft. The Department of Archaeology of Sri Lanka has rejected this story as a mere fiction since there is no archaeological evidence or credible historical records to prove its existence.

According to the Sinhalese legend the Lakegala Rock is thought to mark the location of the Lankapura Kingdom and King Ravana's capital.

It is also said that Ravana met Princess Sita, the queen of Rama, beside this rock. Most Meemure villagers believe that Lakegala is the place where King Ravana flew his aeroplane Dhadu Monara, which he used to capture Sita from India.

Further it is believed that there are two cities in Sri Lanka called Wariyapola, which are believed to be the Airports that used for "Dandu monara" landing and take off. In Sinhala "wa" means"air "and "riya"means "craft " and "pola" means "place". Therefore, "wa+riya+pola" =Wariyapola. The place used for the craft which flies by means of air.
