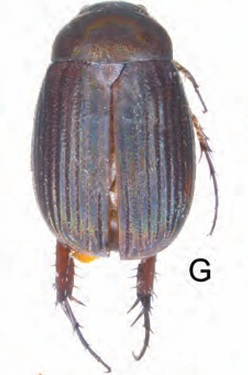

Scientific classification
- Kingdom: Animalia
- Phylum: Arthropoda
- Class: Insecta
- Order: Coleoptera
- Suborder: Polyphaga
- Infraorder: Scarabaeiformia
- Family: Scarabaeidae
- Genus: Maladera
- Species: M. dunhindaensis

Binomial name
- Maladera dunhindaensis Ahrens & Fabrizi, 2016

= Maladera dunhindaensis =

Species of beetle

Maladera dunhindaensis is a species of beetle of the family Scarabaeidae. It is found in Sri Lanka.

== Description ==
Adults reach a length of about 9.8 mm. They have a dark brown, oblong-oval body, with the antennae yellowish. The dorsal surface is mostly dull and glabrous, except for a few short setae on sides of the elytra.

== Etymology ==
The species name refers to its type locality, Dunhinda.
