= Sera Ella =

Sera Ella Falls
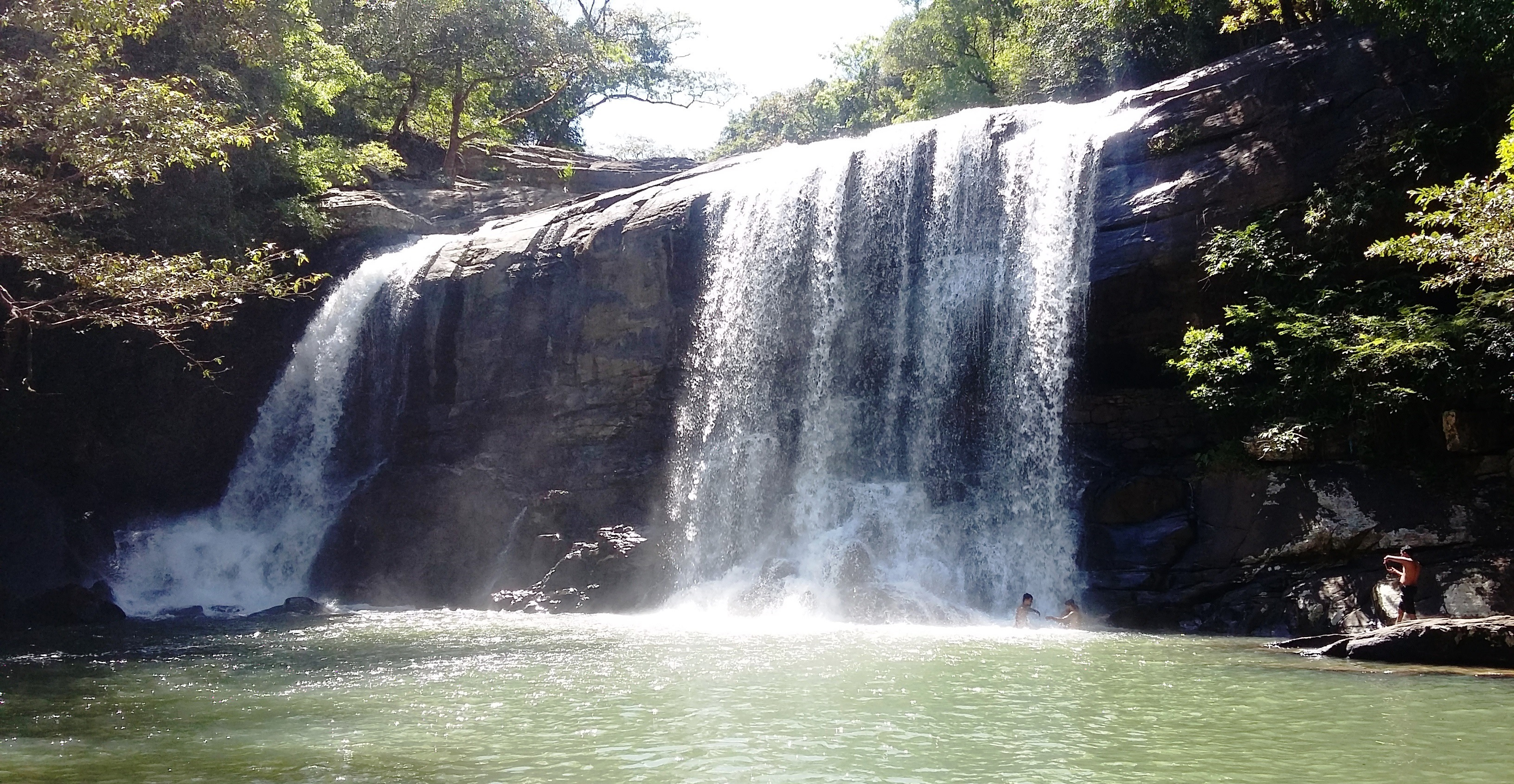
- Interactive map of Sera Ella Falls
- Location: Matale, Sri Lanka
- Coordinates: 7.588304°N 80.7549405°E
- Total height: 10 m (33 ft)
- Number of drops: 2
- Watercourse: Thelgamu Oya

Sera Ella (Sinhala:සේර ඇල්ල) is a waterfall located in Pothatawela village, a place near Laggala in the Matale District of Sri Lanka. It is formed by the waters of Kitul Canal which runs down Kaudagammana peak and the Hunumadala River, which flows from the mountains of Gonamada and Deyuthu Gammmaduwa, combining to form the Puwakpitiya River, a waterway which joins Thelgamu Oya to create the waterfall at its point of joining.

== Features ==
The Sera Ella waterfall is separated into two sections as it falls down the rockface, both falling down a height of 10 m (33 ft) and are visible from the Dumbara Jungle. The fall flows all year around and is at its fullest during the monsoon season, between November and March. One of the interesting features of this fall is the cave behind the fall. Steps has been cut to reach this cave and can be safely reached even when the fall is at full flow.

== Etymology ==
There are several opinions about how Sera Ella got its name. According to one, the name of the fall derives from the ‘Sera’ species of fish that inhabits the water. Another opinion is that the name Sera Ella explains that the beauty of this waterfall is just like the leaves of a sera tree (Lemon grass) hanging down. Some people also claim that because this waterfall reflects the way where a handful of Sera seeds falls down from the palm when it is lowered from the small finger side of the hand it got the name Sera Ella.

== See also ==
- List of waterfalls
- List of waterfalls of Sri Lanka
