= Bomburu Ella =

Waterfall in Sri Lanka

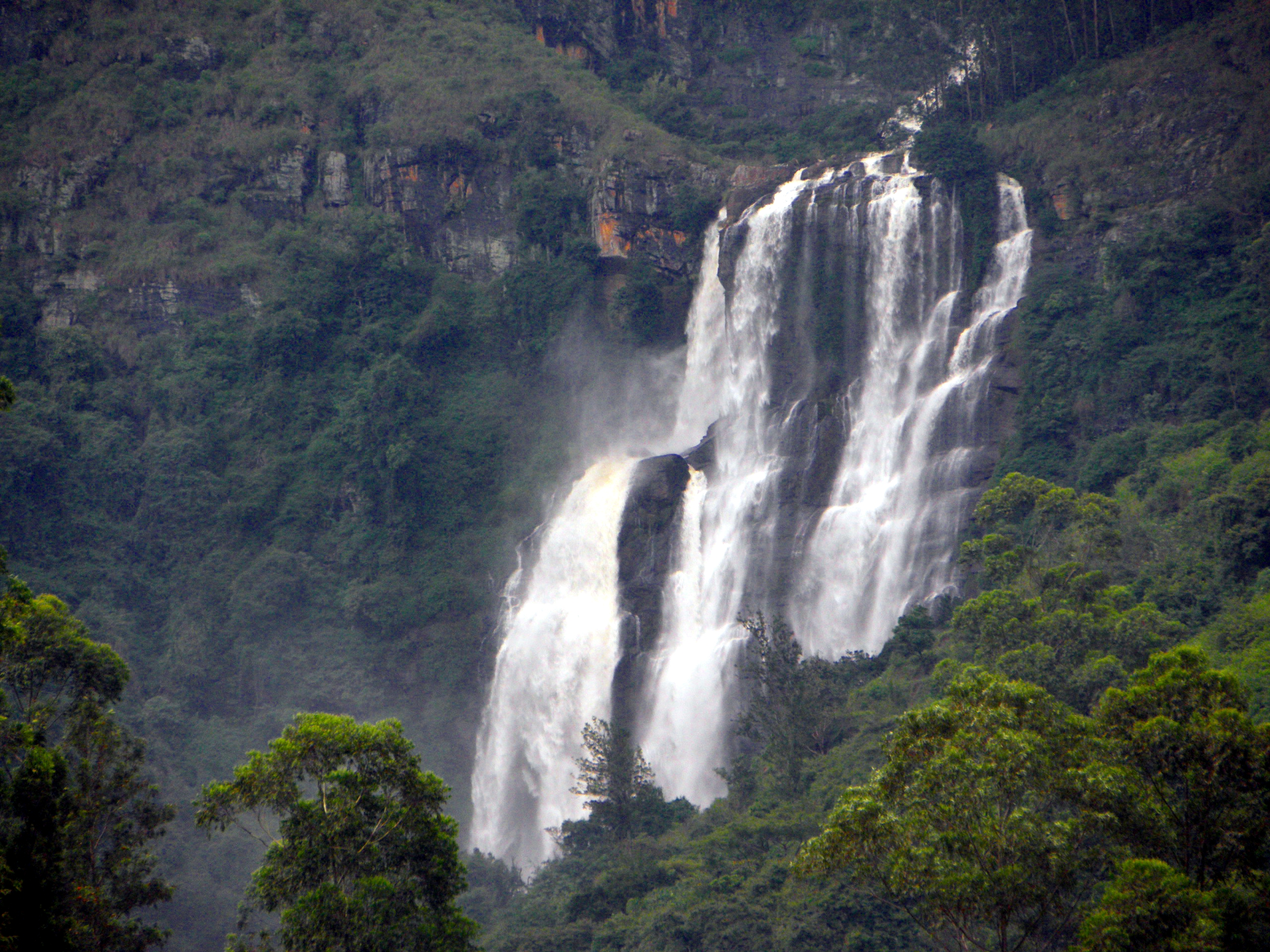
- Interactive map of Bomburu Ella
- Location: Perawella, Sri Lanka
- Coordinates: 6°56′51″N 80°49′51″E

Bomburu Ella, also known as Perawella Falls, is a waterfall in Uva-Paranagama Divisional Secretariat of Sri Lanka. It is located near the border of Nuwara Eliya and Badulla districts, approximately 15 km from Welimada town. The fall is about 50 m in height and 20 m in width and consists of several small waterfalls grouped together. The source of the falls is a lake located in the central highlands of Sri Lanka. Renowned as the widest waterfall in the country, it is composed of several smaller cascades that converge to form a single, expansive waterfall.

== Geography and access ==
The waterfall is located in the Uva-Paranagama Divisional Secretariat area, around 15 kilometres from the town of Welimada. Visitors can reach the site via the Peradeniya–Badulla–Chenkaladi Highway, turning onto the Rendapola–Galahagama–Ambagasdowa Road and passing through Katumana, Seetha Eliya and Hakgala up to Bomburuella. The final stretch involves hiking along Bomburuella Road in Uduhawara.

== Ecological significance ==
Bomburu Ella is located within the Sita Eliya Kandapola Forest Reserve, an area of high biodiversity. The waterfall is fed by the upper part of the main tributary of the Uma River, known as the Dulgala Oya.

== Historical context ==
During the British colonial era, the Dulgala Oya was known as the Fort McDonald River. In his book 'Eight Years in Ceylon', Samuel Baker describes the river and its surroundings, noting the challenges faced by hunters and their hounds due to the rugged terrain and dangerous pools.

== Visiting information ==
Entrance to Bomburu Ella costs LKR 700 (approximately USD 2.50) for foreign adults, and LKR 100 for local adults. A separate parking fee of LKR 100 is also charged.

The hike to the waterfall is approximately one kilometre long and usually takes around 45 minutes. The trail consists of a mix of steps, gravel paths and small bridges, with some sections being narrow and unpaved. Visitors are advised to exercise caution during the rainy season, as certain areas of the trail can become slippery.

Facilities at the site include ample parking at the entrance and several nearby eateries offering meals and basic toilet facilities. Camping at Bomburu Ella is prohibited by the Sri Lankan government.

== See also ==
- List of waterfalls
- List of waterfalls in Sri Lanka
