= Lakegala =

Mountain in Sri Lanka

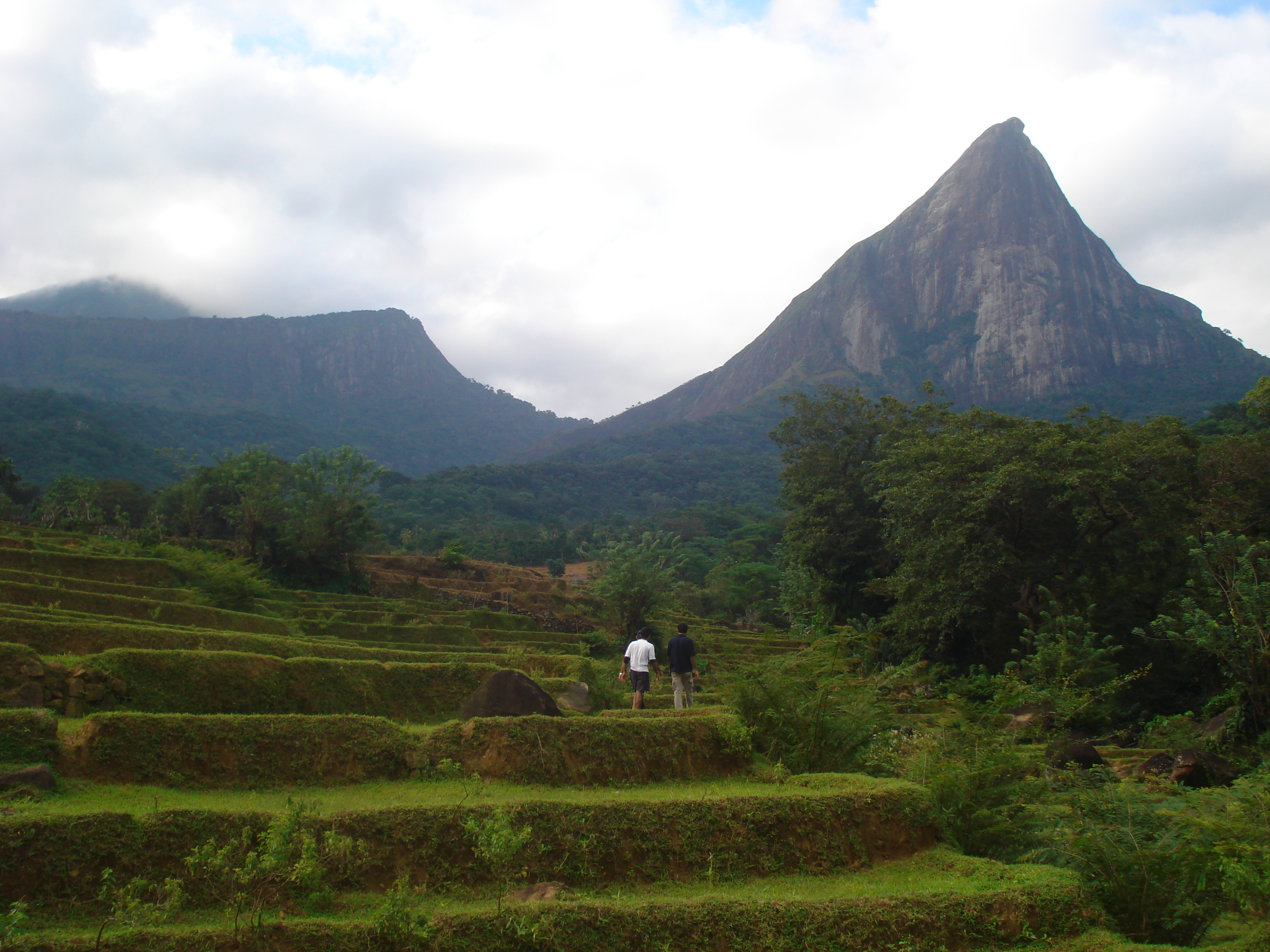
- The Lakegala rock

Highest point
- Elevation: 1,255 m (4,117 ft)
- Prominence: 339 m (1,112 ft)
- Coordinates: 7°27′58″N 80°50′22″E

Geography
- Location within Sri Lanka
- Location: Central Province, Sri Lanka
- Parent range: Knuckles Mountain Range

Lakegala is a mountain in the Knuckles Mountain Range of Central Province, Sri Lanka, near the village of Meemure. It stands close to the boundary between Kandy District and Matale District. In Sinhala the name is taken to mean "the Rock of Lanka".

== Geography ==
Lakegala is an erosional monolith in the Knuckles range, known in Sinhala as Dumbara Mitiyawatha; it presents a near-vertical bare rock face that drops nearly 3,000 feet (910 m). The geographic database PeakVisor records its summit at 1,255 metres (4,117 ft), with a prominence of 339 metres (1,112 ft); a local history by Sudath Gunasekara gives a higher figure of 1,319 metres (4,329 ft). The peak is reached from Meemure on the Kandy side and from Narangamuwa on the Matale side. Meemure is one of the remotest villages in the country, approached over the hills from Hunnasgiriya on the Kandy–Mahiyangana road.

== Folklore ==
In local tradition Lakegala is linked with the legend of the demon king Ravana. One account places his capital, Lankapura, around the rock, while folklore describes the peak as a lookout from which the approach of Rama's army was first seen, and as a launch point for Ravana's mythical flying machine, the Dandu Monara. These accounts are folklore rather than recorded history.

== See also ==
- List of mountains of Sri Lanka
