= Kurundu Oya Falls =

Kurundu Oya Falls කුරුඳු ඔය ඇල්ල
- Location within Sri Lanka
- Location: Walapane, Sri Lanka
- Coordinates: 7°4′43″N 80°51′0″E
- Type: Tiered
- Elevation: 1,524 m (5,000 ft)
- Total height: 189 m (620 ft)
- Number of drops: 2
- Watercourse: Kurundu Oya

Kurundu Oya Falls (Sinhala: කුරුඳු ඔය ඇල්ල) also known as Maturata Ella, is a waterfall located near the town of Walapane in the Nuwara Eliya District of Sri Lanka. The fall has a height of 189 m (620 ft), making it one of the tallest waterfalls in the country. It is the third-highest waterfall in Sri Lanka.

The falls are formed by the Kurundu Oya, which originates from the northern slopes of Pidurutalagala, the highest mountain in Sri Lanka. Kurundu Oya Ella is composed of two distinct cascades separated by a gap of roughly 20 metres. The stream continues downstream as Gurugoda Ella, eventually joining the Mahaweli River before reaching the Randenigala Reservoir.

At the base of the falls, there is a small hydropower plant, and water from the stream is also filtered and distributed throughout the Walapane Division by the National Water Supply and Drainage Board.

== See more ==
- List of waterfalls in Sri Lanka

== Sources ==
- Georgiou, Alexia (2009). Sri Lanka. APA Publications Services. ISBN 9789812820723.
- Showers, Victor (1973). The world in figures. Wiley. ISBN 9780471788591.
