= Devathura Falls =

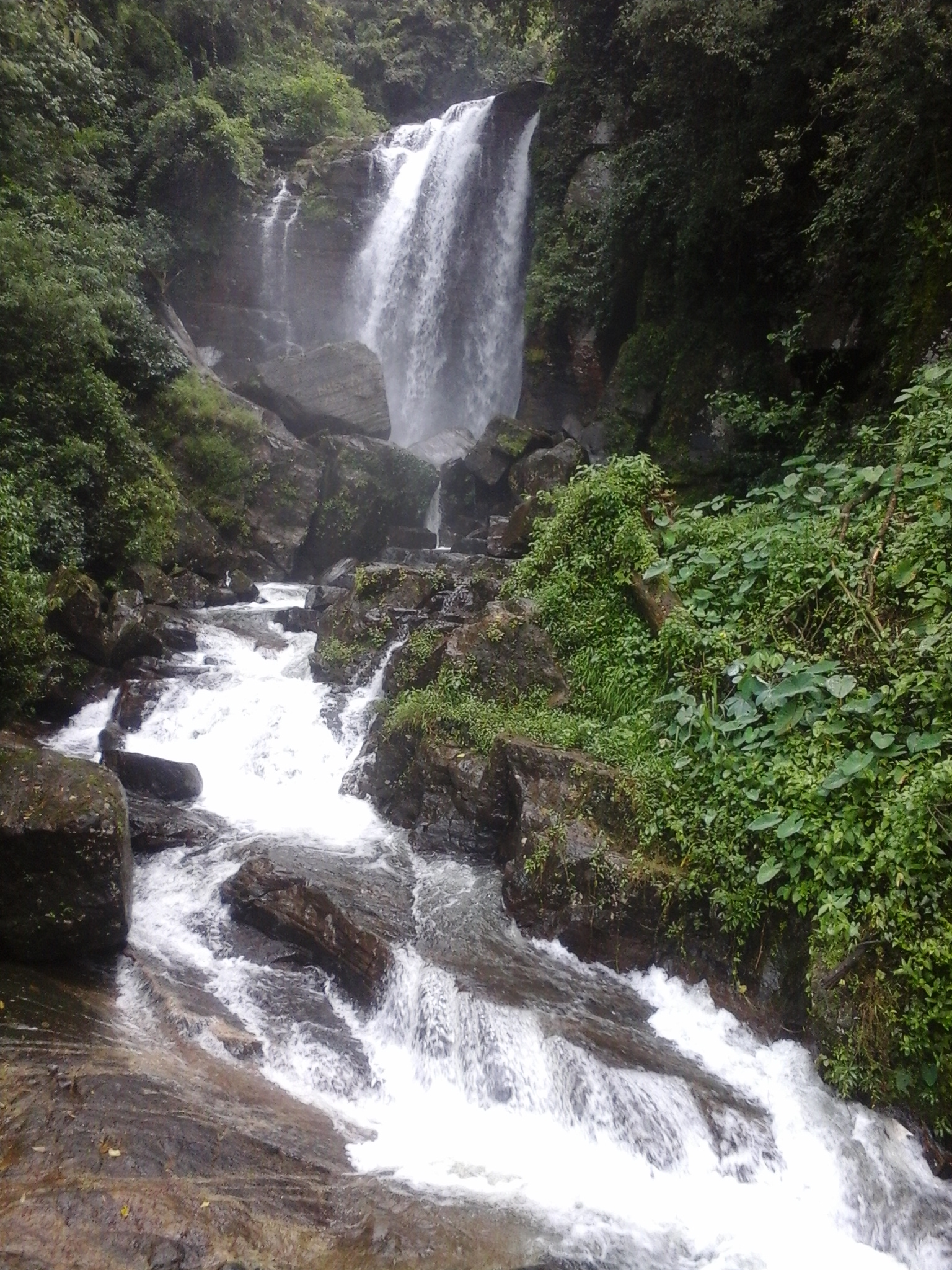
- Lower part of Devathura Falls
- Interactive map of Devathura Falls
- Location: Ramboda Pass, Sri Lanka
- Coordinates: 7°03′30.8″N 80°41′56.6″E
- Total height: 10 metres (33 ft)
- Watercourse: a tributary of Kotmale Dam

Devathura Falls (or formally Thevathura Falls) (Sinhala: දේවතුර දියඇල්ල) is a waterfall in Nuwara Eliya District of Sri Lanka. The water cascades three falls and the lowest part is close to the road at the "ramboda pass", and is approximately 10 meter in height. However, the upper part of waterfall is situated little above the road and is approximately 72 feet in height.

== See also ==
- List of waterfalls
- List of waterfalls of Sri Lanka
