= Galboda Ella =

Galboda Falls
- ගල්බොඩ ඇල්ල
- Interactive map of Galboda Falls
- Location: Galboda, Sri Lanka
- Coordinates: 6°47′04″N 80°42′22″E
- Total height: 30 m (98 ft)
- Number of drops: 1
- Total width: 3 m (9.8 ft)–6 m (20 ft)

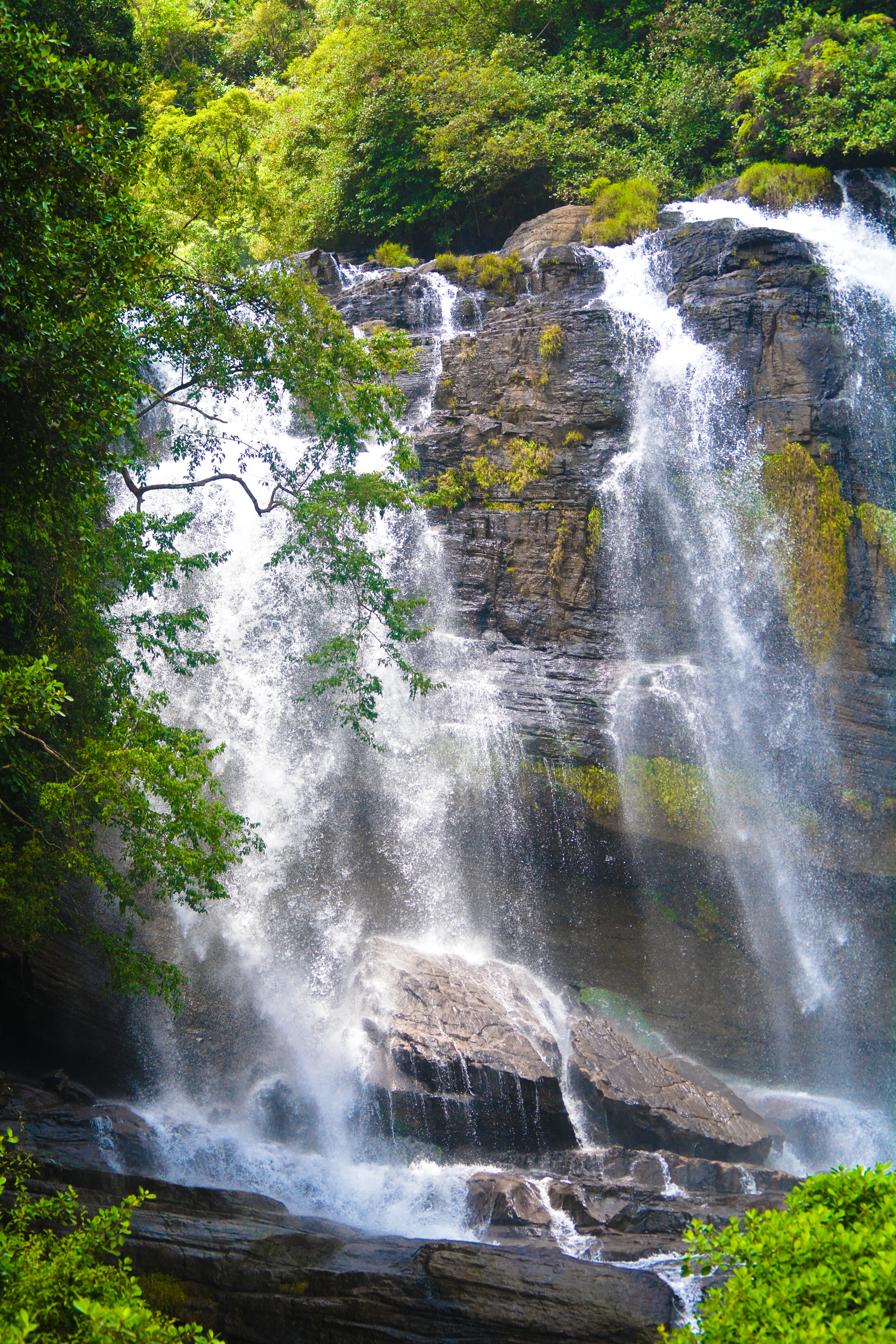
The Beautiful Galboda Falls

Galboda Falls(ගල්බොඩ ඇල්ල) is a waterfall in Sri Lanka. It is located by Nuwara Eliya District. Galboda is along the railway track of Colombo to Badulla. The environment is cool with much rain.

The waterfall is 30 m (98 ft) high, and the width ranges from between 3 m (9.8 ft)–6 m (20 ft), depending on the season. It is 2 km (1.2 mi) from the railway station. Since the area is close to Watawala, where the rainfall is high, the waterfall is ever young. Annual rainfall here exceeds 4500 mm [177 inches], 60% of the rain coming from the south-west monsoon. The dry season is January to February.

== Derivation of name ==
The name of the fall (Galboda) means ‘fall adjoining the stone’. It derives from the large boulder situated at its foot.

=== Travel information ===
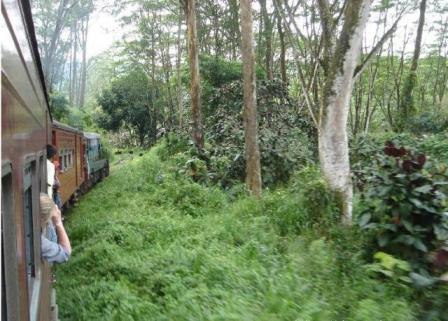
On the way to Galboda

The way to Galboda is by train and by road. There are four express trains from Colombo heading to Badulla and trains stop at Galboda Station. A bus operating from Nawalapitiya to Galboda.

== Village life ==
Galboda is an isolated village located in between Nawalapitiya and Watawala, in the Colombo-Badulla, the upcountry railway. Since there is not a well-developed road system yet, the railway is the only source of transportation for the villagers and travellers.

== Nature and wildlife ==
At certain times of the year, the water cascades in two streams. Growing in the surrounding woodland is a rare species of orchid and the vicinity is home to wildlife. Among them are 12 species of reptile and 4 are only found in Sri Lanka.

== Gallery ==
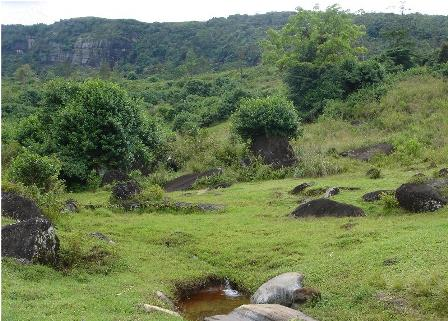
Greenery

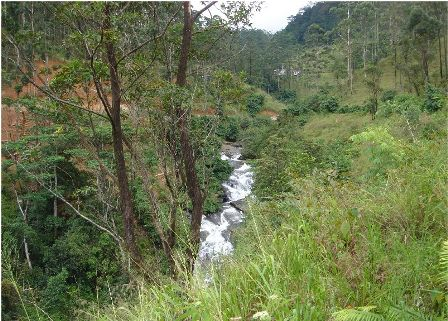
Galboda Ella seen in the distance

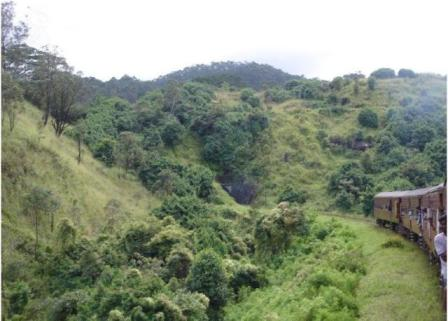
On the way to Galboda

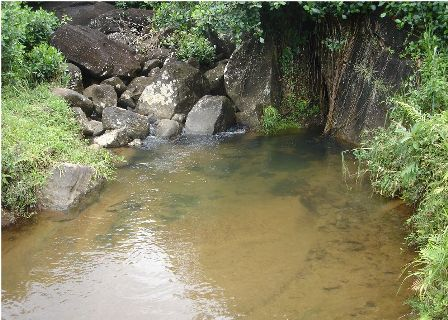
Fresh cold water

== See also ==
- List of waterfalls
- List of waterfalls of Sri Lanka
