= University of Ruhuna =

University in Sri Lanka

- රුහුණු විශ්වවිද්‍යාලය உருகுணை பல்கலைக்கழகம்
- Former names: Ruhuna University College
- Motto: පඤඤා නරානං රතනං Paññayā Narānaṅ Ratanaṅ
- Type: Public research university
- Established: 1978; 48 years ago
- Accreditation: University Grants Commission (Sri Lanka)
- Academic affiliations: University Grants Commission (Sri Lanka), Association of Commonwealth Universities, International Association of Universities
- Endowment: LKR 5.49 billion (2020)
- Chancellor: Venerable Akuratiye Nanda Thero
- Vice-Chancellor: Prof. Sujeewa Amarasena
- Academic staff: 627
- Administrative staff: 1500
- Students: 11,000
- Undergraduates: 10,000
- Postgraduates: 600
- Doctoral students: 60
- Location: Matara and Galle, Sri Lanka; 5.938254961481366°N 80.57661132897475°E
- Campus: Suburban
- Language: Sinhala, Tamil and English
- Colours: Yellow, brown
- Sporting affiliations: Sri Lanka University Games
- Website: http://www.ruh.ac.lk

The University of Ruhuna (Sinhala: රුහුණූ විශ්වවිද්‍යාලය, රෝහණ සරසවිය (Ruhuṇu Viśvavidyālaya, Rohana sarasaviya),; (Tamil: உருகுணை பல்கலைக் கழகம் (urugunai palkazhaik kazhagham) is a public university in Matara, Sri Lanka.

It is the only university in the southern region of Sri Lanka (also referred to as the Kingdom of Ruhuna). It was established by a special presidential decree on 1 September 1978 as Ruhuna University College and upgraded to a full-fledged university on 1 February 1984 by a university order. It is informally known as Ruhuna University or simply Ruhuna.

The university is organized into ten faculties throughout the southern province of Sri Lanka. Its 72-acre (29 ha) main campus is located in the Wellamadama complex in Matara. The Agriculture and Technology faculties are in Kamburupitiya (Matara), while the Engineering, Medicine, and Allied Health Sciences faculties are in Galle. Its LKR 5.49 billion financial endowments are used for academic and research purposes of the university. It operates the Ruhuna Library, which is one of the largest academic and research library systems in Sri Lanka. The Ruhuna University Library System is centered in the main library at the Wellamadama main campus and comprises nearly four other libraries holding over 200,000 volumes.

== History ==
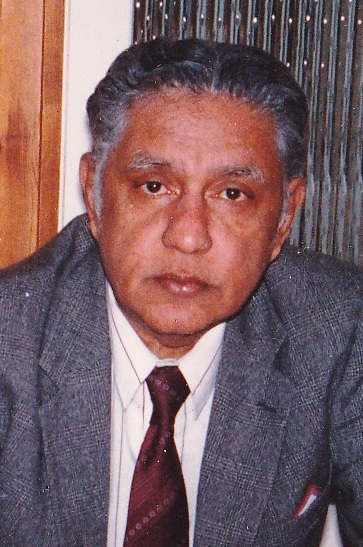
The idea of a University of Ruhuna was proposed in 1978 by Cabinet Minister of Education & Higher Education at the time Dr. Nissanka Wijeyeratne

The idea of a University of Ruhuna was proposed by the Cabinet Minister of Education & Higher Education at the time, Dr. Nissanka Wijeyeratne.

As Cabinet Minister of Education and Higher Education, Wijeyeratne introduced the Universities Act No 16 of 1978 to Parliament. The University of Ceylon was the only university in Ceylon from 1942 until 1978. As a result of this Act, it was separated into five independent universities: University of Colombo, University of Peradeniya, University of Sri Jayewardenepura, University of Kelaniya and University of Jaffna. He also proposed the establishment of the University of Ruhuna and the Open University of Sri Lanka.

=== Inauguration of University college ===
The enactment of the Universities Act No. 46 of 1978 enabled the University Grants Commission to establish the Ruhuna University College. As a result, on 27 August 1978, the Prime Minister J. R. Jayawardene declared open the Ruhuna University College at Meddawatta, Matara, with Prof. Mervyn W. Thenabadu as its .

=== Campus to University status ===
The Ruhuna University College shifted to its new premises in 1984 following which it was elevated to full university status. The new location was selected for the main campus at Wellamadama, two kilometers from Matara facing the Matara-Kataragama main road. Professor G. P. Samarawickrama was the first vice-chancellor of the university. Hon. Ronnie De Mel inaugurated the university after being elevated from campus to university status in 1984. During the past 25 years, it has witnessed considerable progress and development in the academic, research and outreach spheres with substantial improvement in intellectual and infrastructure resources and has emerged as a leader of higher education in Sri Lanka. To date, it has produced about 50,000 graduates and over 75 postgraduates.

== Governance and administration ==
The University of Ruhuna is a state university and depends on the government for much of its annual grant, which is provided by the University Grants Commission (UGC). Due to this, its administration is heavily influenced by the UGC. Undergraduate education is completely free. The governance of the university is under the provisions of the Universities Act No. 16 of 1978 and the Universities (Amendment) Act No. 7 of 1985 along with its own by-laws.

=== Officers of the university ===
Chancellor

The chancellor is the head of the university and awards all degrees, although most duties are carried out by the vice-chancellor. The appointment is made by the president of Sri Lanka, to a distinguished person in academics, clergy, or civil society. The chancellor is Venerable Akuratiye Nanda Thero.

Vice-chancellor

Day-to-day management of the university is undertaken by the vice-chancellor, appointed by the president of Sri Lanka. The current vice-chancellor is Prof Sujeewa Amarasena.

=== Past chancellors and vice-chancellors ===
Chancellors

1. Ven.Paravahera Pannaseeha Mahanayaka Thero
2. Aththudawe Sri Rahula Mahanayake Thera
3. Athi pujya Rajakiya Panditha Pallaththara Sri Sumanajothi Na Himi
4. Ven. Dr. Akuratiye Nanda Thero (Current Chancellor)

Vice-chancellors

1. Prof. G. P. Samarawickrama
2. Prof. Chandrasiri Niriella
3. Prof. S. Pinnaduwage
4. Prof. Ranjith Senaratne
5. Prof. Susirith Mendis
6. Prof. Gamini Senanayake
7. Prof. Sujeewa Amarasena
8. Prof. Jayantha Pasdunkorale (Current Vice Chancellor)

== Campus ==
=== Architectural landscape ===
If this place doesn't turn students into civilized beings, nothing will!

— Geoffrey Bawa-1988

A new building complex for the university was designed by the world-renowned architect Geoffrey Bawa and was constructed at Wellamadama with a unique architectural landscape.

The 30-hectare site straddled three steep hills, the westernmost overlooking the sea and separated from the other two by a low-lying valley that carried the main road from Matara to Hambantota. Bawa placed the vice-chancellor's lodge and a guest house on the western hill and flooded the intervening valley to create a buffer between the road and the main campus. He then wrapped the buildings of the science faculty around the northern hill and those of the arts faculty around the southern hill, using the depression between them for the library and other central facilities.

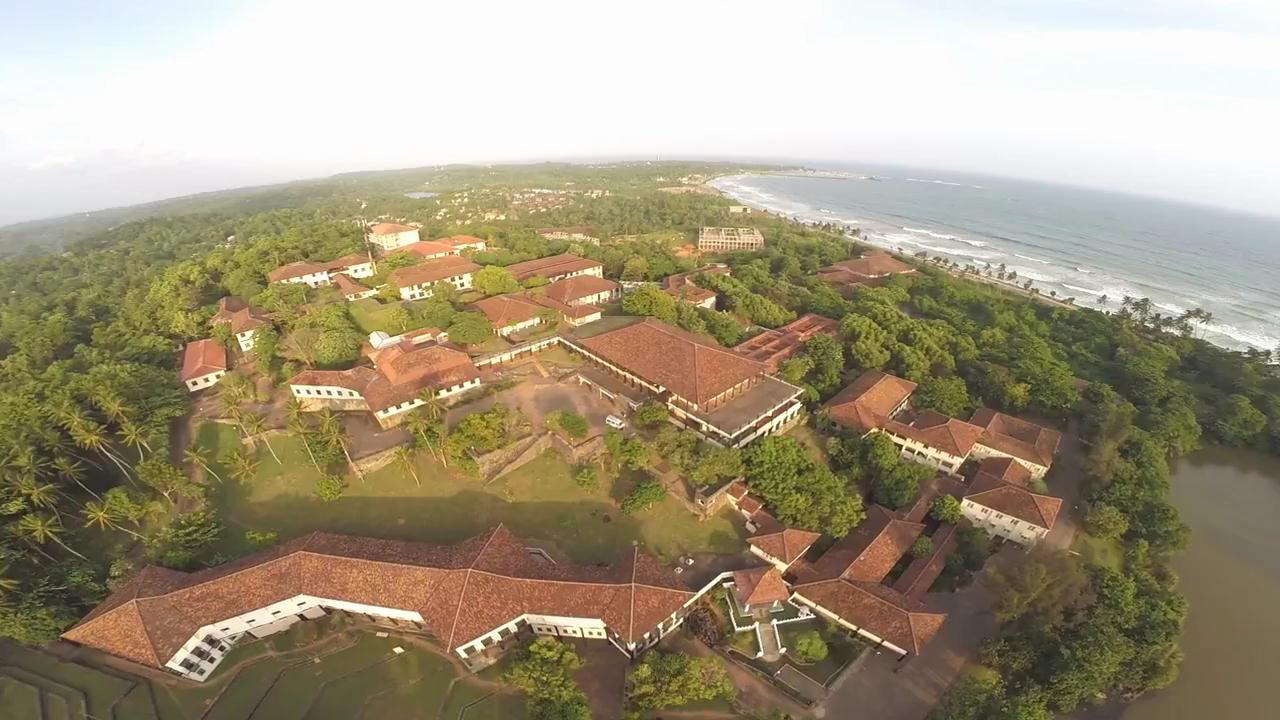
University Complex, Wellamadama

=== Geoffrey Bawa's architecture for Ruhuna ===
In Geoffrey Bawa's architecture, the central role of geography must be a highlight. The buildings as they are conceived are influenced by the "character of the natural terrain, the vegetation, the potential for developing vistas out into the landscape and hence light and shade and of course the related and ever-present aspect of climate". In the Ruhuna campus construction are intimately tied to the topography and the territory they occupy.

=== Rabindranath Tagore Memorial Auditorium ===
The Rabindranath Tagore Memorial Auditorium is the largest auditorium in any of the universities in Sri Lanka.

== Faculties ==
Founding of the Faculties of the University of Ruhuna
Faculty	Year founded
Ruhuna University College	1978
Faculty of Humanities and Social Sciences	1978
Faculty of Agriculture	1978
Faculty of Science	1978
Faculty of Medicine	1980
Faculty of Engineering	1999
Faculty of Management and Finance	2003
Faculty of Fisheries and Marine Sciences and Technology	2005
Faculty of Graduate Studies	2011
Faculty of Technology	2017
Faculty of Allied Health Sciences	2017

The university has ten faculties: Agriculture, Engineering, Fisheries and Marine Sciences & Technology, Humanities and Social Sciences, Management and Finance, Medicine, Science, Graduate studies, Technology and Allied Health Sciences.

The university has responded to the needs of the country and established two new faculties — 'Management and Finance' and 'Fisheries and Marine Science' — the first of its kind in Sri Lanka. Thus, the university has as many faculties as the University of Peradeniya, the largest in Sri Lanka.

The main campus is at Matara. The faculties of Engineering and Medicine are at Hapugala and Karapitiya, about 5 km from Galle city center. The Faculty of Agriculture is at Mapalana, 16 km north of Matara and 2 km south of Kamburupitiya.

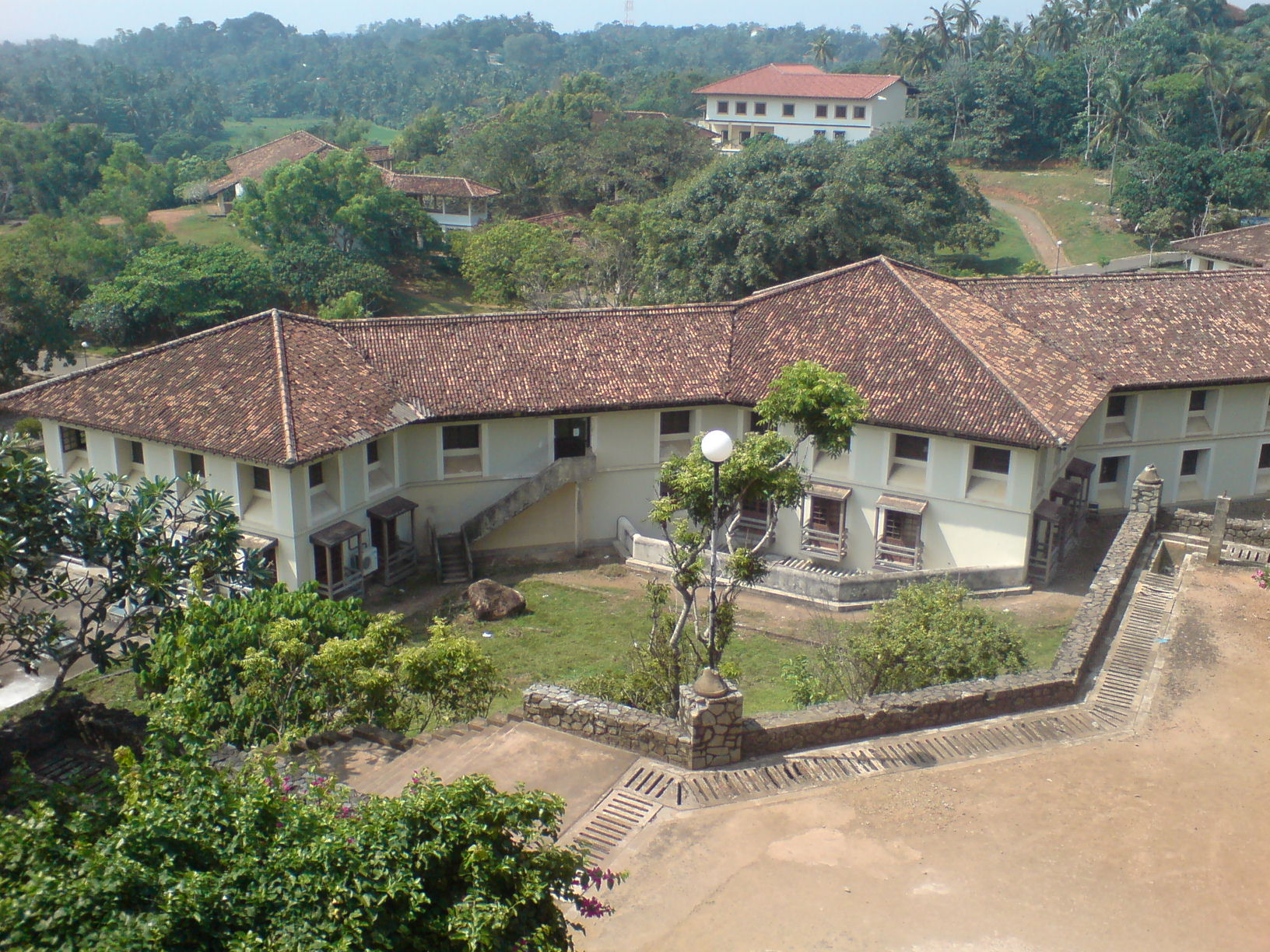
University of Ruhuna

== Research ==
The University of Ruhuna undertakes research, mostly with other universities, government organisations, semi-governmental organisations and non-governmental organisations. The research is funded by both Sri Lankan and foreign entities.

== Publications ==
The University of Ruhuna established during the same year launched Rohana, a multidisciplinary journal devoted to publishing research articles related to applied & natural sciences, management & social sciences, and medical sciences in 1985. The first issue of the journal Tropical Agricultural Research and Extension (TARE) was launched by the University of Ruhuna in 1998, which was followed by the government publication the Annals of the Sri Lanka Department of Agriculture in 1999, providing additional venues for publishing articles on agriculture. The Journal of the Faculty of Humanities & Social Sciences commenced in 1998, providing an additional venue for research output in the area of humanities and social sciences. The University of Ruhuna publishes some of the key academic journals in the country.

- Journal of the University of Ruhuna
- South Asian Journal of Business Insights
- Ruhuna Journal of Science
- Tropical Agricultural Research and Extension (TARE)
- Rohana
- Ruhuna Journal of Medicine

Rohana is a multidisciplinary refereed journal devoted to publishing high-quality research articles related to the applied and natural sciences, management and social sciences, and medical sciences. It commenced publication in 1985.

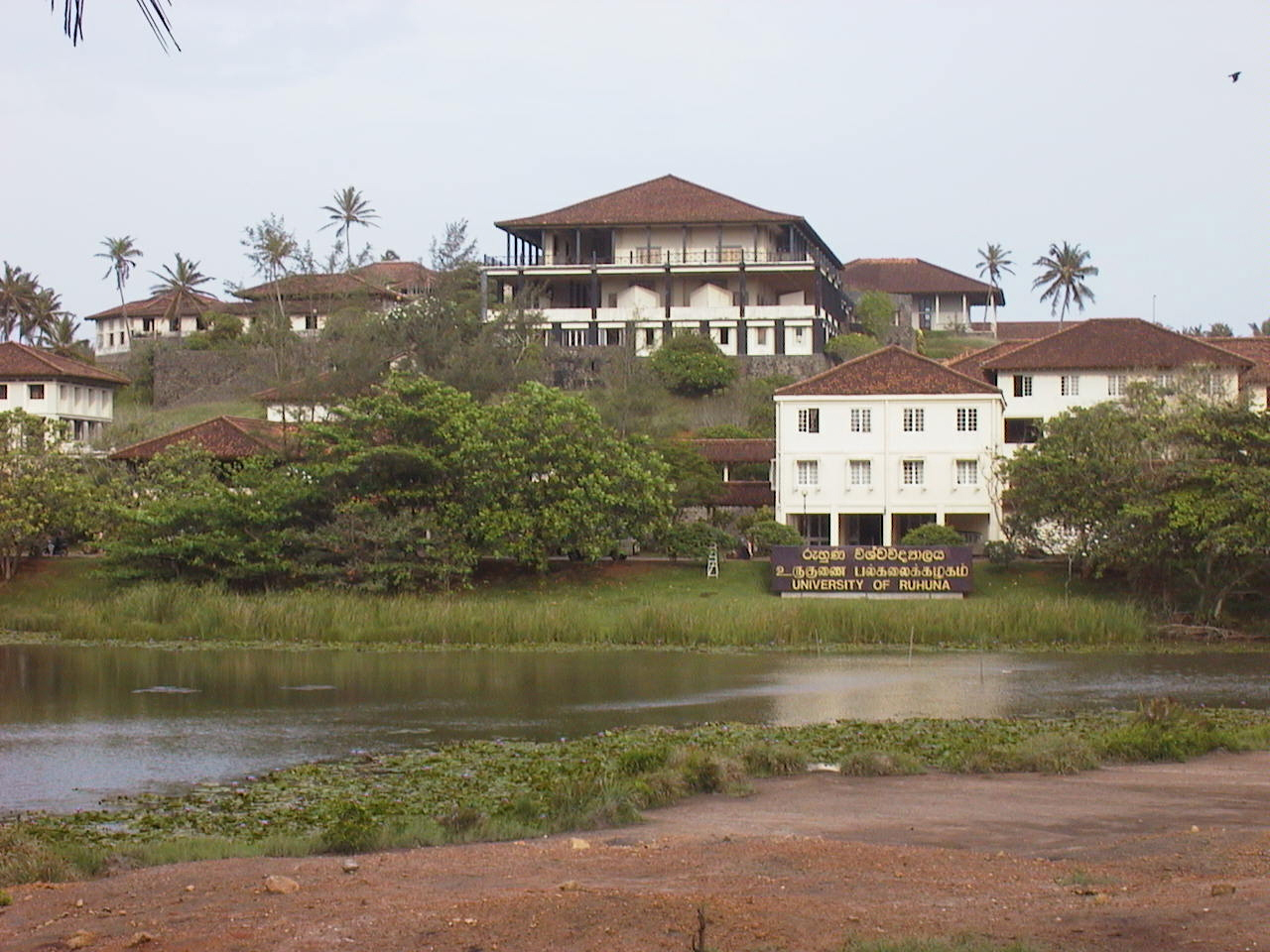
The University of Ruhuna, Northern hill

== Library ==
The university has 5 libraries. The Ruhuna University Library is the central research library, which holds over 0.2 million volumes. It is a legal deposit library, therefore it is entitled to request a free copy of every book published in Sri Lanka. In addition to the University Library and its dependents, almost every faculty or department has a specialised library; for example, Agriculture, Medical, Allied Health Science and Engineering faculty libraries are at the Mapalana, Karapitiya, and Hapugala campuses.

Library, University of Ruhuna
- Location: Matara, Sri Lanka
- Type: Academic and Research
- Established: 1978
- Branch of: Mapalana, Karapitiya, Hapugala, Mahamodara
- Branches: 04

Collection
- Items collected: Books, journals, newspapers, magazines, sound and music recordings, Legal Deposit, databases, maps, stamps, prints, drawings and manuscripts
- Size: 200,000 total Books; 160,000 legal deposit

Access and use
- Members: 12,000

Other information
- Director: Ananda Karunaratne
- Website: http://www.lib.ruh.ac.lk/

The library holds about 200,000 books and about 300 journals (foreign and local). These resources are available in print and electronic formats. Services include reference, lending, interlibrary loan, current awareness services, workshops and maintaining library website with links to resources for which the library have subscribed as well as those available free. The library website also provides access to the CD collection and the Online Public Access catalog. According to library statistics, annual circulation of resources is more than 123,000.

== Student life ==
=== Financial aid ===
Each year ten financially disadvantaged students from the Civil and Environmental Engineering program are entitled to a special scholarship sponsored by Ceylon Steel Corporation
