= Dunumala Ella =

Waterfall in Sri Lanka

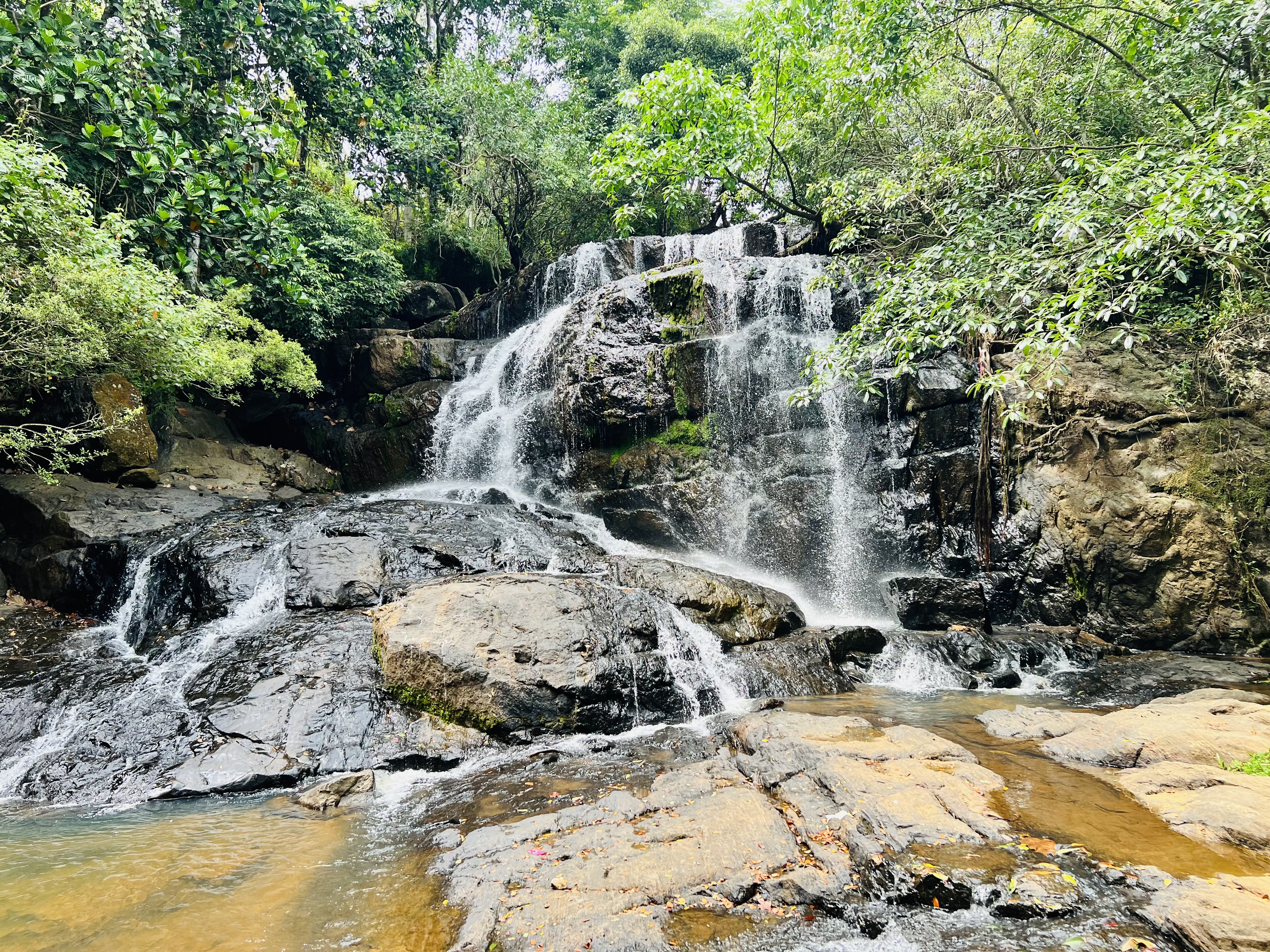
- Location: Uduwaka, Sri Lanka
- Type: Cascade
- Elevation: 129 m (423 ft)
- Total height: 45 ft (14 m)
- Number of drops: 1
- Watercourse: Algama Oya, a tributary of Attanagalu Oya

Dunumala Ella, is a waterfall in Sri Lanka, situated 30 km (19 mi) east of Gampaha, in Kegalle District. The waterfall is about 45ft high and is formed by Algama Oya, a tributary of Attanagalu Oya. It is also known as Uduwaka Falls or Devin Penna Ella.

Some of the scenes from the popular Sri Lankan film Siri Parakum were shot near the waterfall. This is one of the two waterfalls on Attanagalu Oya and the other is Bopagama Ella.

== See also ==
- List of waterfalls
- List of waterfalls of Sri Lanka
