= Surathali Falls =

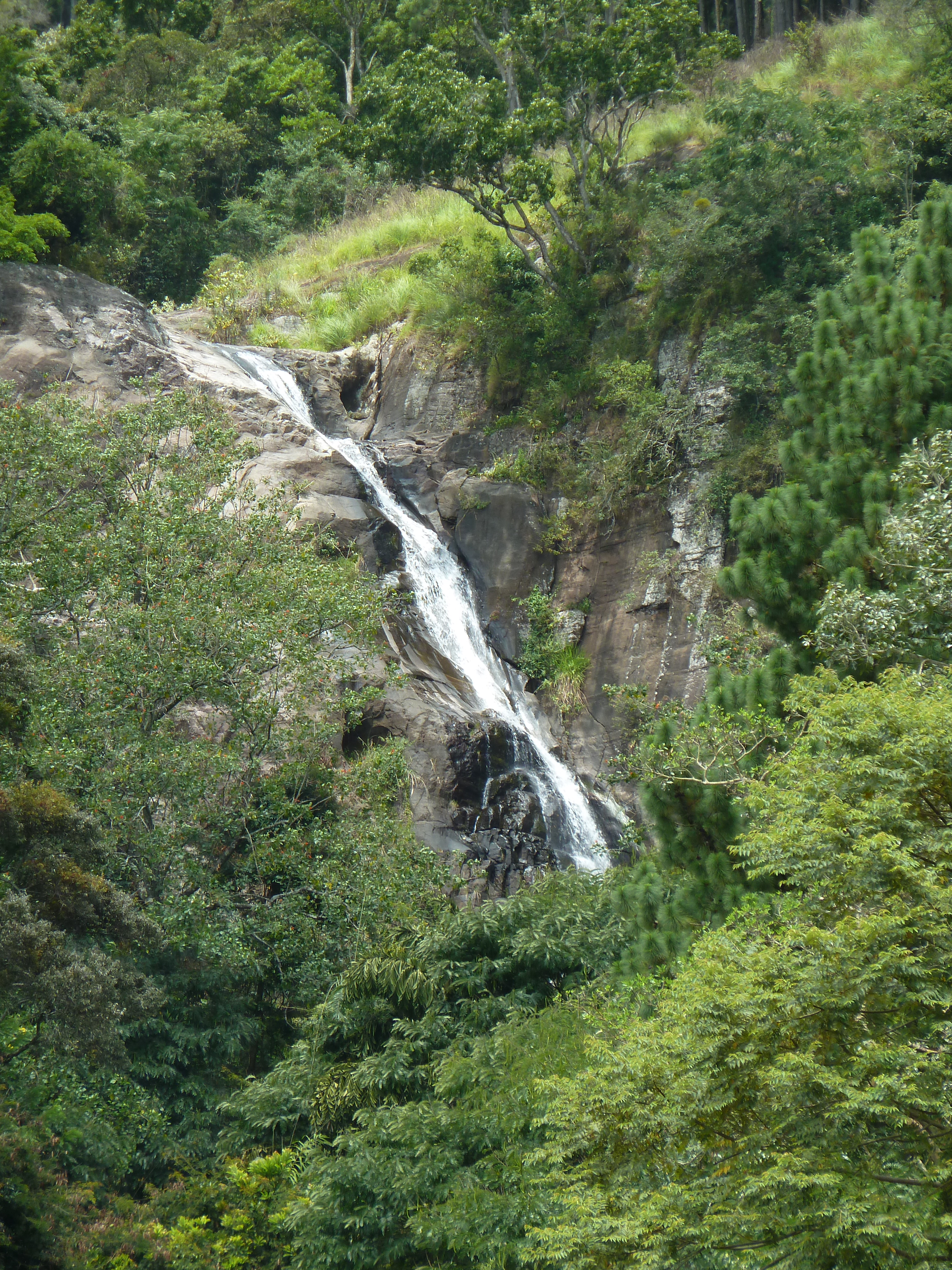
- Interactive map of Surathali Falls
- Location: Ratnapura District, Sri Lanka
- Coordinates: 06°44′45″N 80°49′44″E
- Total height: 60 metres (200 ft)
- Average width: 2 metres (6.6 ft)

Surathali Falls (Sinhala: සුරතලී ඇල්ල, Surathali Ella) is a 60-metre (200 ft) waterfall in Walhaputenna of Ratnapura District in Sri Lanka.

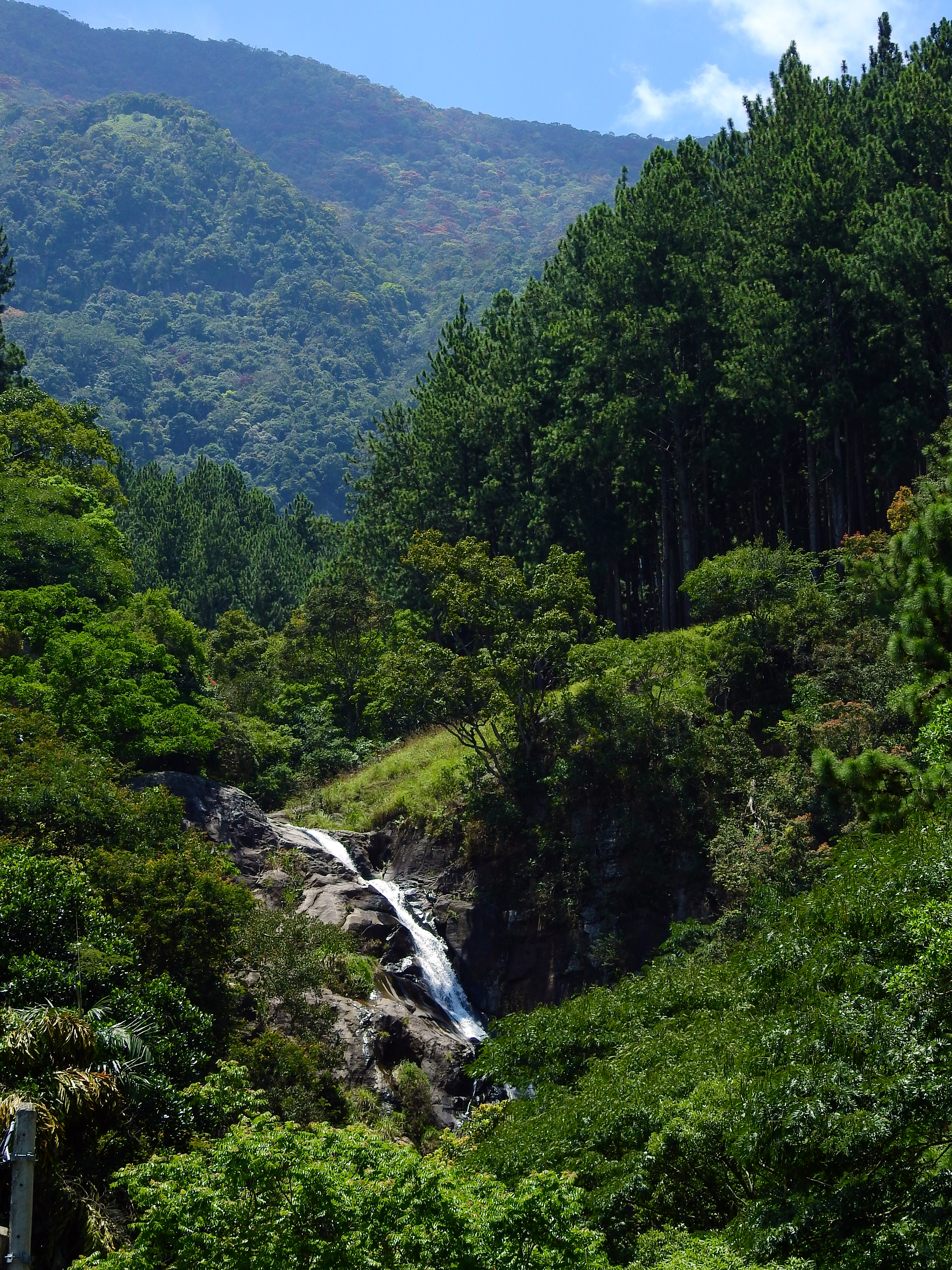
The waterfall as seen from the Colombo—Batticaloa road.

== See also ==
- List of waterfalls
- List of waterfalls of Sri Lanka
