= Ramboda Falls =

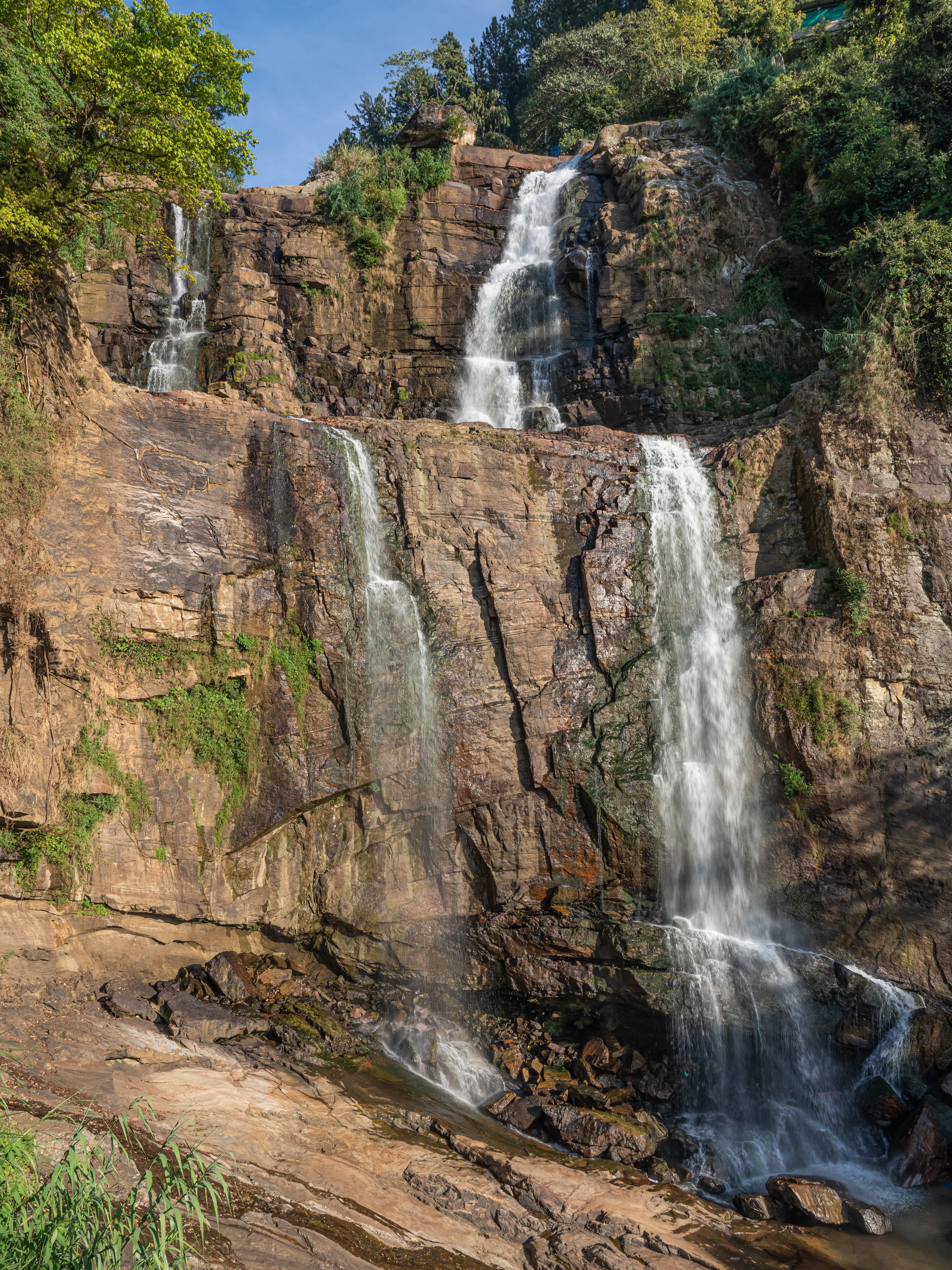
- Ramboda Waterfall
- Interactive map of Ramboda Falls
- Location: Ramboda Pass, Ramboda, Sri Lanka
- Coordinates: 7°04′01″N 80°42′00″E
- Type: Tiered
- Elevation: 345 m (1,132 ft)
- Total height: 109 m (358 ft)
- Number of drops: 2
- Watercourse: Panna Oya, a tributary of Kotmale Oya
- World height ranking: 729

Ramboda Falls is 109 m (358 ft) high and the eleventh tallest waterfall in Sri Lanka and the 729th tallest waterfall in the world. It is situated in Kothmale area, on the A5 highway at Ramboda Pass. The waterfall is formed by the Panna Oya which is a tributary of Kothmale Oya. The falls have an elevation 945 m (3,100 ft) above sea level.

== See also ==
- List of waterfalls
- List of waterfalls in Sri Lanka

== Citations ==
=== References ===
- Abeyawardena, H.A.P. (2004). Kandurata Praveniya (in Sinhala) (1st ed.). Sri Lanka Central Bank. ISBN 9789555750929.
- Senanayake, Chanaka (2004). Sri Lankawe Diya Eli (in Sinhala) (1st ed.). Sooriya Publishers. ISBN 955-8892-06-8.
