= Doovili Ella =

Waterfall in Sri Lanka

Duvili Ella
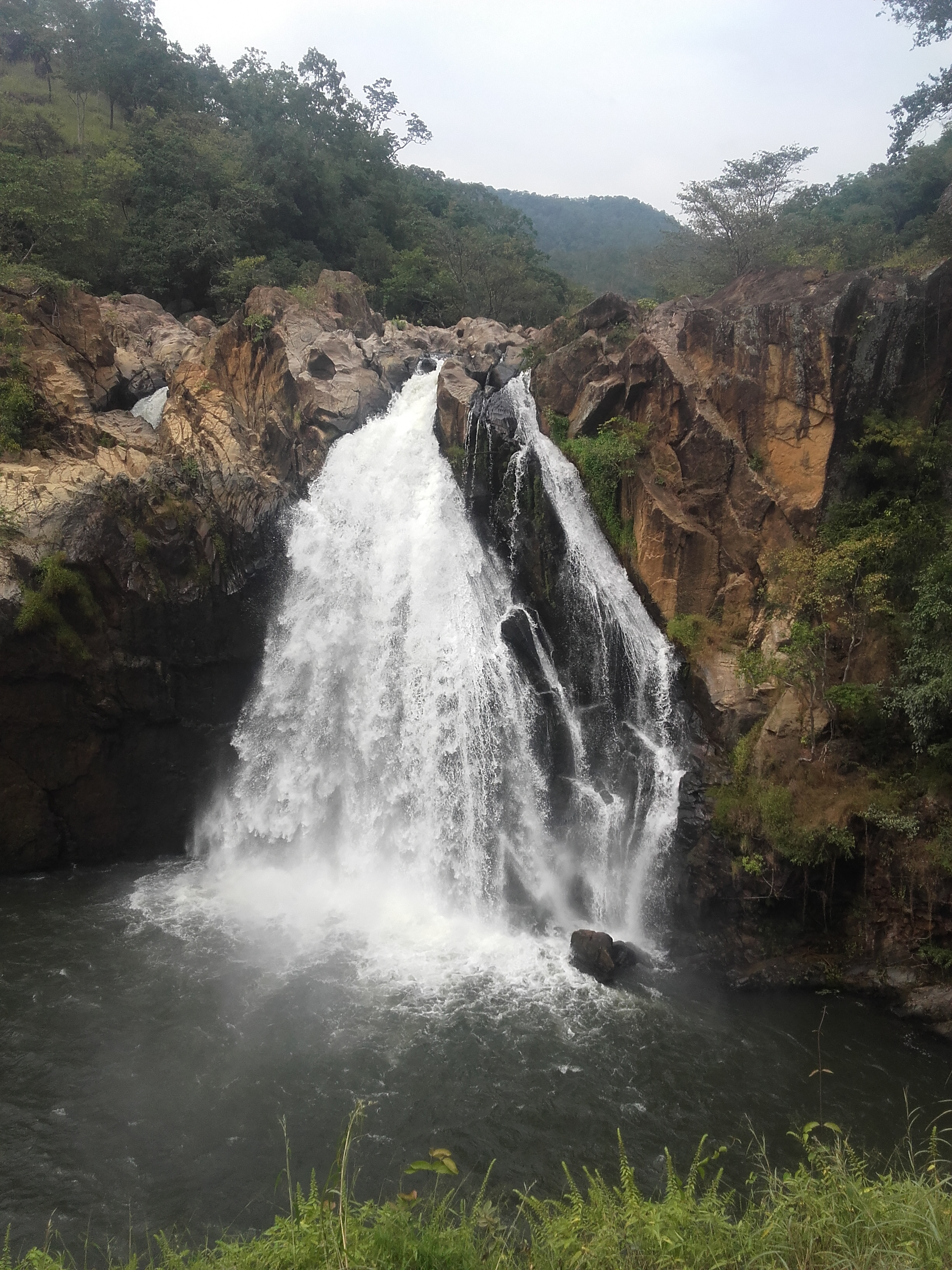
- Interactive map of Duvili Ella
- Location: Kaltota, Sri Lanka
- Coordinates: 6°39′44.4″N 80°51′57″E
- Total height: 40 metres (130 ft)
- Watercourse: Walawe River

Duvili Ella or Walawe Ganga East Falls (Sinhala: දූවිලි ඇල්ල) is a waterfall in Monaragala District, Sri Lanka. It is located in Thanjantenna village.The height of the waterfalls is about 40 m (130 ft). The name 'Duwili' is derived from the Sinhalese for dust, which describes the spray emanating from the waterfall.

== See also ==
- List of waterfalls
- List of waterfalls of Sri Lanka
