= Dunhinda Falls =

Coordinates: 7°01′N 81°04′E

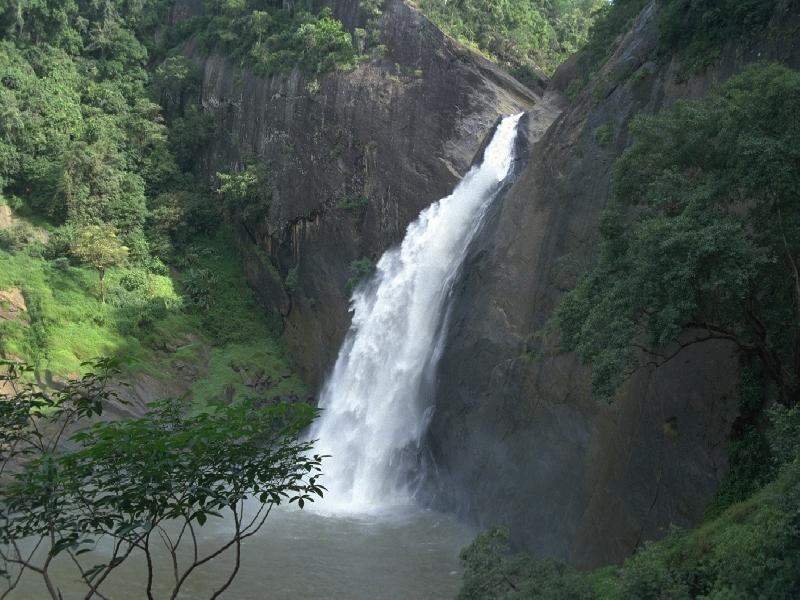
- Interactive map of Dunhinda Falls
- Location: off Badulla, Sri Lanka
- Total height: 64 metres (210 ft)
- Watercourse: Badulu Oya

Dunhinda Falls is a waterfall located about 5 kilometres (3.1 mi) from Badulla in the lower central hills of Sri Lanka.

The waterfall, which is 64 metres (210 ft) high, is created by the Badulu Oya, a river that flows through Badulla. The name "Dunhinda" is derived from the Sinhala word dun (දුන්), meaning mist or smoke, referring to the smoky spray-like mist that rises at the base of the falls.

Dunhinda is one of the most popular and scenic waterfalls in Sri Lanka. Although it is not among the tallest waterfalls in the country, it is renowned for its dramatic appearance and surrounding natural beauty, and is often described as one of the most picturesque waterfalls on the island.

== Access and Location ==
The waterfall is accessible via the Badulla–Mahiyangana main road. About 6 km from Badulla, a junction known as Dunhinda Junction marks the entrance to the trail. A signboard and a gated path on the right side of the road guide visitors to the falls. From this point, the waterfall can be reached by walking approximately 1 kilometre along a dedicated footpath.

There are parking facilities near the entrance, and the trail is lined with vendors selling herbal drinks, grains, and local snacks. Although the path is generally well-used and not isolated, it becomes narrow in some places, requiring caution.

Along the trail, visitors will see a smaller waterfall known as Kuda Dunhinda (Little Dunhinda). While visible from the footpath, reaching this smaller fall requires walking through a more rugged forest path and is not recommended without proper preparation.

At the end of the trail, a viewing platform has been constructed, offering a safe vantage point to observe the main waterfall.

== Caution and Conservation ==
Swimming near the base of Dunhinda Falls is extremely dangerous due to strong currents and submerged rocks. Visitors are advised to avoid approaching the water too closely. Additionally, wild elephants and monkeys are occasionally spotted along the trail. Travelers are strongly advised not to feed the wild animals or carry food containers in visible areas.

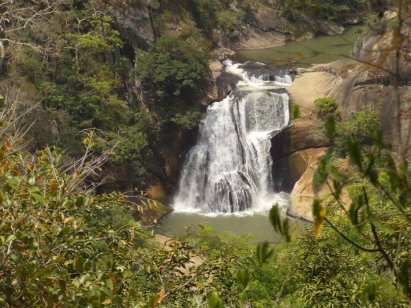
smaller waterfall known as Kuda Dunhinda

Tourists are encouraged to minimize environmental impact by avoiding littering and refraining from carrying plastic into the area.

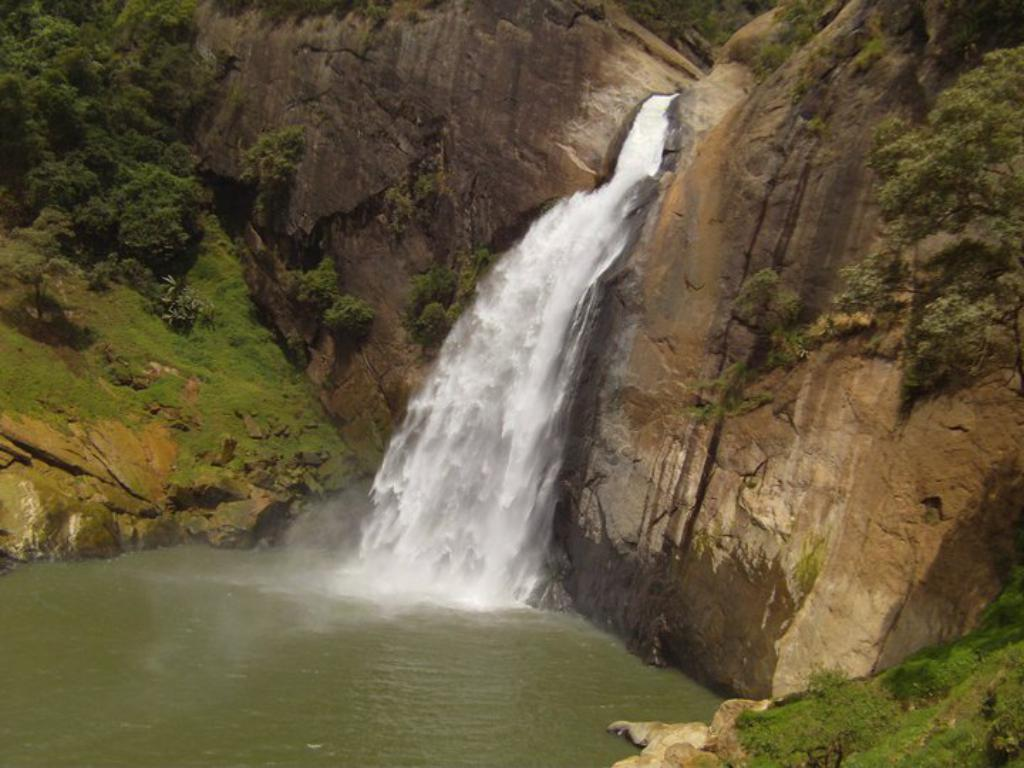
Dunhinda waterfalls in 2018

== Historical background ==
The waterfall is also interwoven with local history and folklore. According to ancient tales, during the reign of King Rajasinghe II of Kandy, the Badulu Oya river was blocked by a giant creeper known as the “Kalu Wandura Wel” (කළු වඳුර වැල්). The king ordered it to be removed to prevent flooding of the paddy fields. After much effort, the obstacle was cleared and the magnificent Dunhinda waterfall emerged in its current state.

== Tourist attraction ==
Today, Dunhinda Falls remains one of the most popular tourist attractions in Sri Lanka. Both local and foreign tourists flock here throughout the year. The best time to see the waterfall at its most beautiful is from November to March, when the water level is at its highest. The surrounding area, filled with birdsong and lush greenery, offers a truly enchanting experience.

== Natural Environment ==
The area around Dunhinda is rich in biodiversity. Visitors can observe a wide variety of plants, trees and animals, including rare species. The riverbanks and surrounding forest provide habitats for many birds and small mammals, making the area ideal for nature enthusiasts. The air is fresh and cool, and the sound of cascading water creates a peaceful atmosphere that is perfect for relaxation and photography.

== See also ==
- List of waterfalls
- List of waterfalls of Sri Lanka
