= Mapalana =

Village in Sri Lanka

- Location within Sri Lanka
- Coordinates: 6°03′N 80°34′E
- Country: Sri Lanka
- Province: Southern Province
- District: Matara District
- Elevation: 7 m (23 ft)

Population (2024)
  - Total: 1,107
- Time zone: UTC+5:30 (Sri Lanka Standard Time Zone)
  - Summer (DST): UTC+6 (Summer time)
- Postal code: 81100

Mapalana (Sinhala: මාපලාන) is a village in Matara District, Sri Lanka, 175 km (109 mi) from Colombo. It is approximately 3 km (1.9 mi) from Kamburupitiya where the University of Ruhuna's Faculty of Agriculture is located.

The village is located at the junction of the Thihagoda-Kotapola (B415) highway and Mapalana-Boraluketiya Road.

== Etymology ==
The name of the village was originally "Maha Pala Ana", which historically means "the great garden with fruits".

== Notable attractions ==
It is also the site of the Mapalana falls (Mapalana Ella), a 141 m (463 ft) three-tier waterfall, the fourth tallest waterfall in Sri Lanka. According to local folklore the waterfall derives its name from a local nobleman (maapaa) who used to bathe at waterfall, hence maapaa-nana (place where the nobleman bathed) which became mapanana and later mapalana.
