= Meemure =

Coordinates: 7°26′0″N 80°50′0″E

- Village
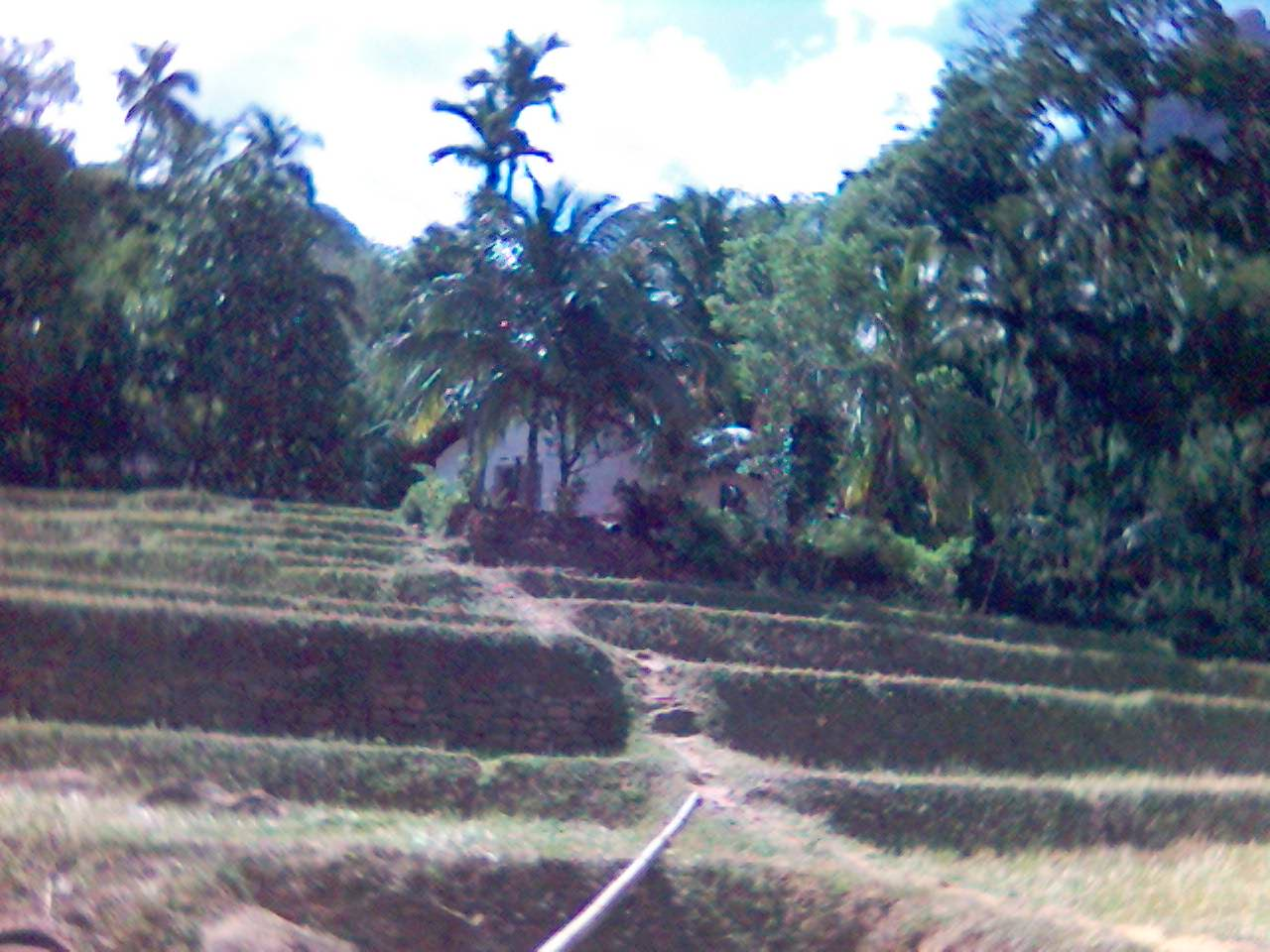
- Interactive map of Meemure

Population
  - Total: 400

Meemure is a village with a population of about 420 people living in it It is located near the border between Kandy District and Matale District in the Knuckles Mountain Range. Meemure is one of the least populated villages in Sri Lanka with the only access via a 14 km (8.7 mi) trail from the town of Loolwatte. There is no cellular service available in the village, but a CDMA telephone service is available. There is no direct mail delivery to the village; a villager journeys each day to Thapal Junction to exchange incoming and outgoing postal mail with a postman.

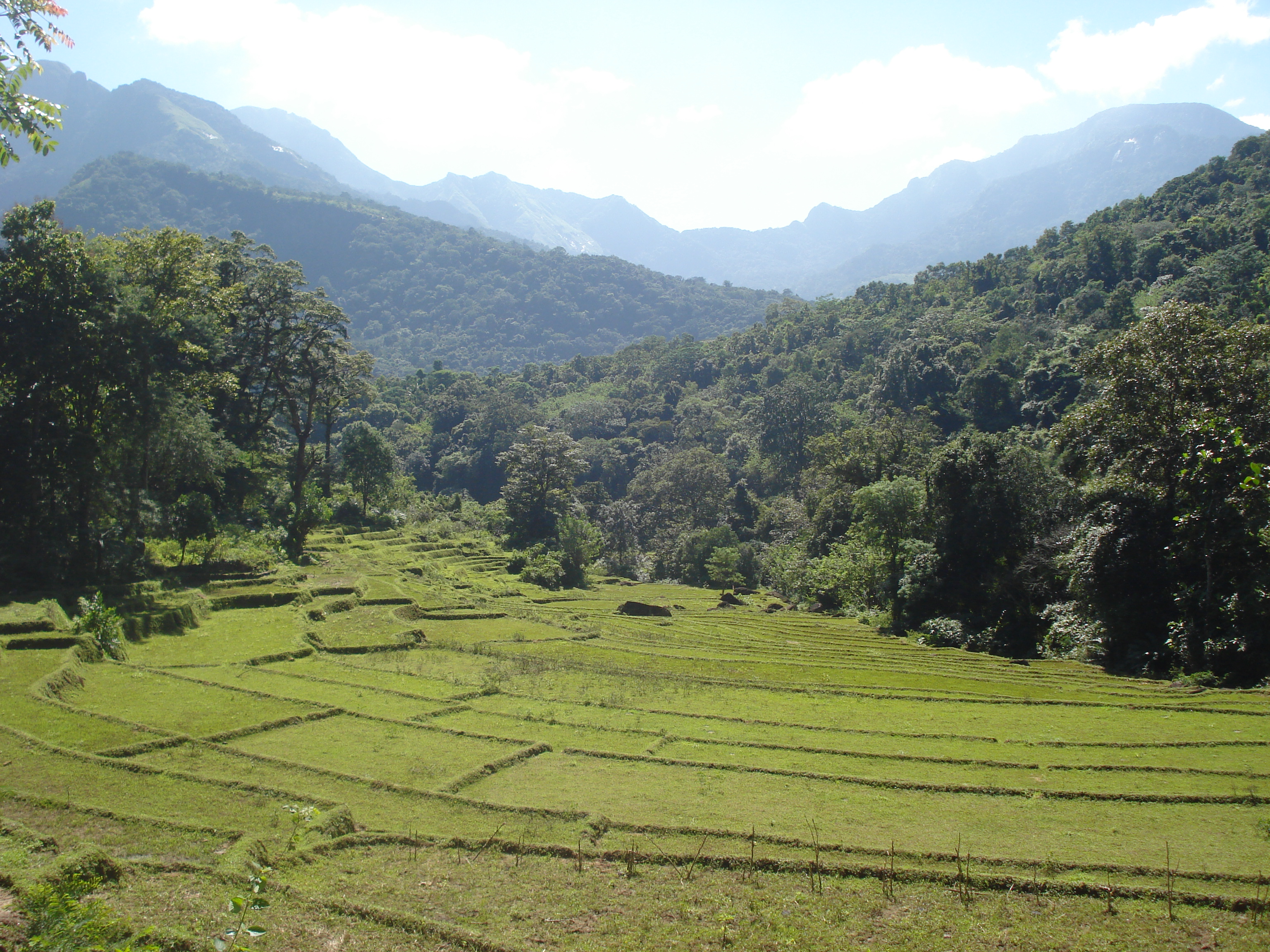
Paddy fields in Meemure Village

Lakegala mountain is in Meemure village. Residents of the village depend on several staple crops including pepper, cardamom, paddy and ginger. The distance from Colombo capital to Meemure is about 175 km.

== Route ==
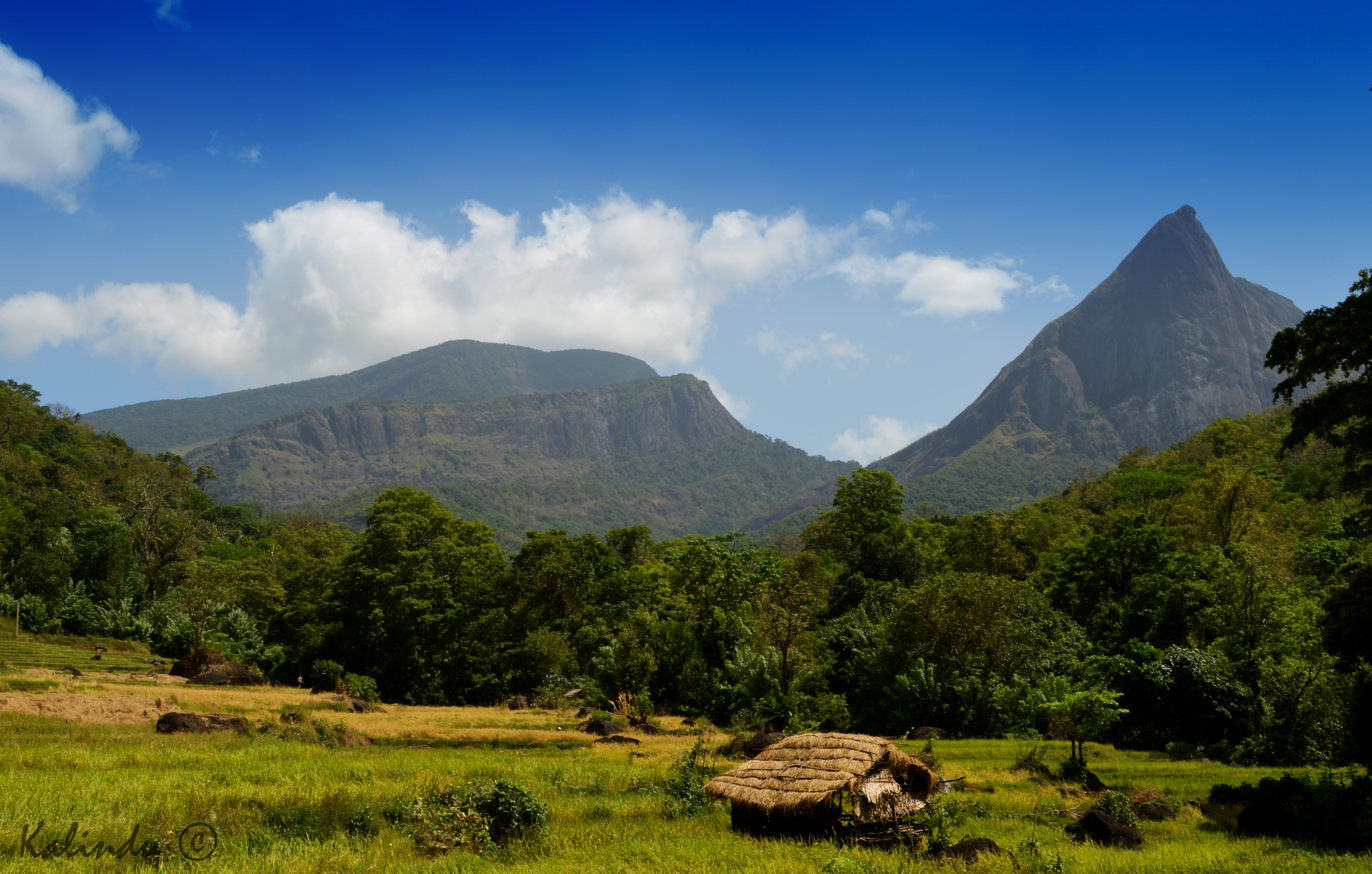
Meemure Village and Lakegala

Meemure is approximately a 7-hour drive from Colombo, in an off-road vehicle. The main route is via Kandy city which is 116 km away from Colombo. Then Kandy-Mahiyangana Road (A26) towards to Mahiyangana. Turn to Left from Hunnasgiriya Junction which is 35 km away from Kandy. Then go towards the Loolwatte Village which is 15 km away from Hunnasgiriya Junction. Then from Loolwatte it is about another 15 km to the Meemure Village. The nearest Police station is Udadumbara Police.

On your way to Meemure from Colombo are a number of sites, including Hulu Ganga (River), Victoria Reservoir, Teldeniya New Town (Teldeniya was flooded in filling the Reservoir behind the Victoria Dam, Mahaweli Project), Dothalugala Forest and Botanical Garden, Mini Worlds End, Coberts Gap (Attala Mottuwa) a place where lot of wind blowing to the other side, Meemure and Lakegala Mountain where, according to legend, King Rawana lifted his Air Plane called Dhadu Monara.
