= Dolosbage =

Place in Sri Lanka

Coordinates: 7°05′N 80°28′E

- Village
- Interactive map of Dolosbage
- Country: Sri Lanka
- Province: Central Province
- District: Kandy District
- Time zone: UTC+5:30 (Sri Lanka Standard Time)

Dolosbage is a village in the Kandy District, Central Province, Sri Lanka. The Raxawa and Kabaragala rocks are the main landmarks of this area. Dolosbage has many tea estates started during the colonial era. It has a cold climate due to its elevated position.

== See also ==
- List of towns in Central Province, Sri Lanka
