= List of settlements in Central Province (Sri Lanka) =

Central Province is a province of Sri Lanka, containing the Kandy District, Matale District, and Nuwara Eliya District. The following is a list of settlements in the province.

== A ==
Abasingammedda, Adhikarigama, Agalakumbura, Agalawatta, Agappola, Agrapatana, Agrapatna, Akarahaduwa, Akkarawatta, Akuramboda, Akurambodwatta, Akurana, Aladeniya, Alagalla Kondagama, Alagalla Pahalagama, Alagoda, Alakagama, Alakola-anga, Alakola-ela, Alakoladeniya, Alakolamada, Alakolamaditta, Alakolawewa, Alanduwaka, Alapalawala, Alapalawela, Alawattegama, Alawattegama, Alawatugama, Alawatugoda, Alayaya, Alhentennawatta, Alkemada, Alubendiyaya, Aludeniya, Alugolla (7°5'N 80°28'E), Alugolla (7°9'N 80°31'E), Alugolla (7°40'N 80°37'E), Alupotawela, Alutgama (7°31'N 80°35'E), Alutgama (7°42'N 80°35'E), Alutgama (7°22'N 80°39'E), Alutgama Mahakumburegammedda, Alutnuwara, Alutnuwara Town, Alutwatta Alutwewa, Aluvihare, Aluvihare Colony, Aluwihare, Alwatta, Ambadeniya, Ambagahahena, Ambagamuwa (7°1'N 80°28'E), Ambagamuwa (7°18'N 80°33'E), Ambagaspitiya, Ambagastenna, Ambakumbura, Ambalapitiya, Ambale, Ambaliyadda (7°10'N 80°46'E), Ambaliyadda (7°1'N 80°54'E), Ambanella, Ambanpola, Ambanwala (7°13'N 80°31'E), Ambanwala (7°13'N 80°31'E), Ambaoruwa, Ambatalawa (6°58'N 80°30'E), Ambatenna, Ambawa, Ambawela, Ambetenna, Ambewela, Ambokka, Ampitiya, Amuna, Amunewala, Amunugama, Amunumulla, Amunupitiya, Amunupura, Amunupure, Amupitiya, Andagala (7°22'N 80°30'E), Andagala (7°46'N 80°31'E), Andawala, Andawela, Andideniya, Andungama Palkumbura, Andurubebila, Angammana, Angunawala, Angunawela, Anguruwela, Anguruwella, Ankande Colony, Ankendagolla, Ankumbura, Ankumbura Pallegama, Ankumbura Udagama, Appallagoda, Arambagama, Arambepola, Aranpitiya, Arattana (7°13'N 80°34'E), Arattana (7°22'N 80°43'E), Arawwawala, Arukwatta, Aruppola, Asgeriya, Asgiriya, Aswalapitiya, Asweddunwela, Atabage, Atabage Pallegama, Atirahapitiya, Attanakumbura, Attanayakagammedda, Attaragalla, Attaragama, Attaragama Hunnana-oya, Attaragama Hunnanoya, Awulbodale

== B ==
Badalagama, Badalgammedda, Baddamulla, Bahiragaldowa, Bahirawakanda, Balagahatenna, Balagolla, Balana, Balawatgoda, Bambarabedda, Bambarabedde Devainnegama, Bambaradeniya, Bambaragahawatta, Bambaragaleyaya, Bambaragama, Bambaragaswewa, Bambawa, Bamunupola, Bananga, Banange, Barandare, Barigama, Batadanduwela, Balagolla, Batagolla, Batalawatta, Batugoda, Batumulla, Bebalagama, Beddegama, Beligamuwa, Beliyakanda, Bembiya, Beragama, Beravilla, Berawila, Bibila, Bobella, Bodikotuwa, Bogahapitiya, Bogambara, Bogamuwa, Bogawantalawa, Bogawela, Bokalawela, Bokkawala, Bolagandawela, Bolepe, Bombure, Bomure, Bopana, Bopegammedda, Bopitiya, Boragahamaditta, Boruwagama, Botota, Bowatta, Bowatura, Boyagama, Brookside, Bulanawewa, Bulatwelkandura, Bulugahapitiya, Bulugolla, Bulukohotenna, Bulumulla, Butalanda, Butawatta

== C ==
Campion, Clodagh Eastern Colony

== D ==
Dadahogama, Dadohagama, Dagampitiya, Dagewilla, Dalupota, Daluwela, Damana, Dambagahamada, Dambagahamuduna, Dambagolla, Dambagolla, Dambalagala Colony, Dambarawa, Dambarawa, Dambe, Dambul, Dambulla, Dambullagama, Damunumeya, Damunumulla, Damunupola, Damunupola North, Dandenikumbura, Dankanda, Danture, Dara-oya, Daskara, Daulagala, Dawatagahamulatenna, Dedunupitiya, Dehianga, Dehiattawala, Dehideniya, Dehideniya Madige, Dehigahatule, Dehigama, Dehigastenna, Dehintalawa, Dehipagoda, Dehipe, Dehipitiya, Deiannewela, Deiyannewela, Dekinda, Deldeniya, Delgasyaya, Deliwela, Delmada, Delpatkada, Delpawana, Delpitiya, Deltota, Demada-oya, Dembatagastenna, Dembawa, Demodara, Demunapola North, Denapitiya, Denike, Devahandiya West, Devinnegama, Devita, Devon, Dewahandiya, Dewahandiya East, Dewahandiya West, Dewahuwa, Dewatagahamulatenna, Dibburuwela, Dickoya, Diddeniya, Digahawatura, Digala, Digana, Digane, Diggala, Dihintalawa, Dikirillagolla, Dikkumbura, Dikoya, Dimbula, Dimbulgahakotuwa, Dimbulgoda, Dimbulkumbura, Dippitiya, Divulgaskotuwa, Diyabubula, Diyapalagoda, Dodamitiyawa, Dodandeniya, Dodandeniya, Dodangolla, Dodankumbura, Dodankumbura, Dodanwala, Dolapihilla, Dolosbage, Dolosbage Bazaar, Doluwa, Dombagammana, Dombagasdeniya, Dombagoda, Dombawala, Dombawela, Doragomuwa, Dorakumbura, Doraliyadda, Doraliyadda, Doranegama, Dowita, Dowitagammedda, Dullewa, Dulmure, Dulwala, Dulwela, Dumbukola, Dunkumbura, Dunukaula, Dunukebedda, Dunukebedda, Dunukeula, Dunukewatta, Dunuwila, Dunuwila Megodagama

== E ==
Ebbawala, Edanduwawa, Egodagama, Egodakanda, Egodamulla, Egodawela, Ehalagastenna, Ehalamalpe, Ekamuthugama, Ekiriya, Eladetta, Elamaldeniya, Elamalwewa, Elgama, Elhanyaya, Elikewela, Elkaduwa, Ellauda, Ellekumbura, Ellepola, Ellewatta, Elliyadda, Elotuwa, Elpitiya, Embalagama, Embekka, Embilmeegama, Embitiyawa, Embulambe, Embulpure, Enasalmada, Endarutenna, Enkendagolla, Eramuduliyadda, Erawula Pahalagama, Eregoda, Ereula Pahalagama, Etabendiwewa, Etakehellanda, Etambagahawatta, Etambagahawatta Udispattu, Etambagolla, Etambegoda, Etamulla, Etipola, Etulgama

== G ==
Gabbala, Gabbela, Gabbela, Gadaladeniya, Galabadawatta, Galabawa, Galaboda, Galabodawatta, Galagama, Galagedara, Galagoda, Galaha, Galaha Town, Galahitiyagama, Galahitiyawa, Galaliyadda, Galamuduna, Galata, Galauda, Galaudahena, Galboda, Galdola, Galewela, Galgomuwa, Galhinna, Galkadawela, Galketiwela, Gallahawatta, Gallella, Gallinda, Galpitiya, Galuke, Galwadukumbura, Galwaduwagama, Galwangedihena, Galwetiyaya, Gammaduwa, Gammulla, Gammunukumbura, Gampola, Gampola Town, Gampolawela, Gamunukumbura, Ganegalagammedda, Ganegoda, Gangahenwala, Gangoda, Gangodagammedda, Gangodapitiya, Ganguldeniya, Ganhata, Gankewala, Gankewela, Gannoruwa, Gansarapola, Gedaramada, Gedarawela, Gelioya, Gerandigala, Getambe, Getembe, Getiyawala, Gettapola, Gettiyawala, Giddawa, Ginigathena, Ginnoruwa, Giragama, Giragma, Girahagama, Girantalawa, Giraulla, Girihagama, Godagama, Godagama, Godagandeniya, Godakumbura, Godamuna, Godamuduna, Godamunna, Godapola, Godapussa, Godatale, Godawela, Godigamuwa, Golahenwatta, Golegammana, Gollangolla, Gomadale, Gomagoda, Gonapola, Gonawala, Gonawatta, Gonawela, Gondawela, Gondeniya, Gondewala, Gonewala, Gonigoda, Govindala, Gunadaha, Gunnepana Gabadagama, Gunnepana Madige, Gunnepana Pallegammedda, Gunnepana Udagammedda, Gurubebila, Gurudeniya, Gurugala Ella, Gurugalle Ella, Gurugama, Gurukete, Gurulupota, Guruwela

== H ==
Hakmana, Hakurutale, Haladiwela, Halagama, Halangoda, Halgolla, Haliyadda, Haliyala, Haliyedde, Halmehikandura, Halminiya, Halpola, Handabowa, Handaganawa, Handessa, Hangaran Oya, Hangarandeniya, Hangarapitiya, Hangran Oya, Hanguranketa, Hanguranketa Town, Hanwella, Happawara, Hapudandawala, Hapudandawela, Hapugaha-Arawa, Hapugahamulla, Hapugahapitiya, Hapugaharawa, Hapugasdeniya, Hapugaspitiya, Hapugastalawa, Hapugoda, Hapukanda, Hapupe, Haputale Pallegama, Haputale Udagama, Haputale Udagammedda, Hapuwala, Haragama, Haraggama, Harakola, Harangala, Harankahagoda, Harankahawa, Harasbedda, Harasgama, Harden-huish, Hassalaka, Hatadukkuwa, Hatamunagala, Hataraliyadda, Hathugoda, Hatiyaldeniya, Hatiyalwela, Hatnagoda, Hatton, Hatugoda, Hedeniya, Hedunuwawa, Hegama, Hegasulla, Helambagahawatta, Hemagahahena, Hembarawa, Hemure, Henagahawela, Henagehuwala, Henagehuwala Medagammedda, Henapola, Henaya Rotawewa, Hendeniya, Henegama, Henegama Palkumbura, Henepola, Hepana, Hettigammedda, Hevanewala, Hewaheta, Hewanetenna, Hewanewala, Hewawissa, Hewawisse, Hiddaulla, Hilpankandura, Hilpenkandura, Hilton Colony, Himbiliyakada, Hinagama, Hindagala, Hindagoda, Hindirigama, Hingulwala, Hingulwela, Hingurewela, Hingurukaduwa, Hinnarangolla, Hippala, Hippola, Hiriyalagammana, Hitgoda, Hitgoda Walpola, Hitigegama, Hitigolla, Hiyadala, Hiyadala, Hiyadala Walpola, Hiyarapitiya, Hiyawela, Holbrook, Homagama, Homapola, Hombawa, Horagahapitiya, Horakada, Horton Plains, Huduhumpola, Hulangamuwa, Huluganga, Huluganga Town, Hunnasgiriya, Hunuange Bogaskumburegammedda, Hunuange Imbulkotadeniya, Hunugalpitiya, Hunuketa-ela, Hunuketawala, Hunuketella, Hurikaduwa, Hurikaduwa Madige, Hurikaduwe Madige

== I ==
Idamagama, Idamelanda, Idampitiya, Ihagama, Ihaladiggala, Ihalagama Niyangama, Ihalakande Bavulana, Illagolla, Illawatura, Illukpelessa (7°1'N 80°54'E), Illuktenna (7°10'N 80°55'E), Illuktenna (7°22'N 80°55'E), Illukwatta, Ilpemada, Ilukhena, Ilukpelessa (7°7'N 80°49'E), Ilukpelessa (7°1'N 80°54'E), Ilukpelessa (7°27'N 80°54'E), Iluktenna, Ilukwatta, Imaduwa, Imbulandanda, Imbuldeniya, Imbuletenna, Imbulgolla, Imbulmalgama, Imbulpitiya, Inguruwatta, Inigala, Ipiladana, Irahanda, Iriyagolla, Irrahanda, Ittamalliyagoda, Ivurawala

== J ==
Jahakagama

== K ==
Kadadekawewa, Kadadoovapitiya, Kadadora Pallegammedda, Kadadora Udagammedda, Kadadorapitiya, Kadawala, Kadawatgama, Kadugannawa, Kadugawnawa, Kaduwela, Kahagala, Kahalla, Kahapathwela, Kahapatwala, Kahatadanda, Kahatagaha, Kahatagaha Aswedduma, Kahatagastenna, Kahatapitiya, Kahawatta, Kahawatugoda, Kaikawala, Kaineke, Kalaganwatta, Kalagolla, Kalalgamuwa, Kalalpitiya, Kalapathwela, Kalapitiya, Kalawagahawadiya, Kalawala, Kalaweldeniya, Kalotuwawa, Kaludella, Kaludemada, Kaludewala, Kalugal-oya, Kalugala, Kaluganga, Kaluwane, Kambarawa, Kamburadeniya, Kammaltera, Kanakkarapola, Kanangamuwa, Kandalama, Kandangama, Kandanhena, Kandapola, Kande, Kandegama, Kandegama, Kandegama, Kandegedara, Kandekumbura, Kandekumbura, Kandekumbura, Kandemoragolla, Kandewela, Kanduregoda, Kandurugoda, Kandy, Kannadeniya, Kapuliyadda, Kaputupola, Karagala, Karagama, Karagastenna, Karakolagahatenna, Karakolagastenna, Karaliyadda, Karalliyada Kandegammedda, Karalliyadda, Karalliyadda, Karalliyadda Kandegammedda, Karamada, Karamindula, Karandagolla, Karandamaditta, Karuwalagahadewala, Karuwalakelewatta, Karuwalakelle, Katarandana, Katarandena, Kathurupitiya, Katugastota, Katumana, Katupathwela, Kavudupelella, Kavudupitiya, Kavulpana, Kavulpone, Kawdupelella, Kawudupelella, Keenagolla, Keerapone, Kehelella, Kehelwala, Kehelwatta, Kehelwatta, Kekelawatta, Kekulalanda, Kekulalla, Kekulanda, Keliyalpitiya, Kendagolla, Kendagolla, Kendagollamada, Kendaliadda, Kendaliyadda, Kendangamuwa, Kengalla, Kengalla Pahalagammedda, Ketakandura, Ketakumbura, Ketayapatana, Kimbulantota, Kindigoda, Kinigama, Kinigama, Kinigama, Kiralagama, Kiralagolla, Kiralessa, Kirapane, Kirapone, Kiribatkumbura, Kirigankumbura, Kirimedilla, Kirimetiya, Kirimetiyawa, Kirinda, Kirindewela, Kirindiketiya, Kirindiwelpola, Kirioruwa, Kiripattiya, Kiriwan Eliya, Kiriwanagoda, Kiriwaula, Kiriwavula, Kirlulgama, Kitulangomuwa, Kituldora, Kitulpe, Kiul-ulpota, Kiula, Kiulewadiya, Kobbeakaduwa, Kobbekaduwa, Kobbewala, Kobbewehera, Kochchikaduwa, Kohilawatta, Kohodeniya, Koholanwala, Koholanwela, Koholdeniya, Kohomada, Kohonapuwakgaha-ela, Kollawela, Kolonella, Kolugala, Konakagala, Konakalagala, Kondadeniya, Kongahakotuwa, Kongahamulla, Kongahawela, Konkalagala, Korahagoda, Korahana, Kosgalla, Kosgolla, Koshinna, Kosinna, Koskote, Kosruppe, Kossinna, Koswana, Koswatta, Kotabogoda, Kotagala, Kotagepitiya, Kotagepitiya, Kotakedeniya, Kotakepitiya, Kotakumbura, Kotaligoda, Kotambe, Kotawagura, Kotikambe, Kotinkaduwa, Kotmale, Kottala, Kottinkaduwa

== L ==
Labugama, Labugolla, Lagamuwa, Landupita, Lappanagama, Legundeniya, Leloya, Lemasuriyagama, Lenadora, Lenawala, Lendora, Lesliewatta, Letiyahena, Leudeniya, Lewdeniya, Lewella, Lewellagolla, Lewla, Lindula, Linipitiya, Liniyaketiya, Liyandeniya, Liyanwela Helagama, Liyanwela Pahalagama, Loolkade, Lunugama

== M ==
Maberiya, Madadeniya, Madahapolakanda, Madakumbura, Madampitiya, Madanpitiya, Madanwala, Madawala, Madawala Demalabage, Madawala Madige, Madawala Ulpota, Madiligama, Madipola Marakkalabage, Madugalla, Madulkele, Madulkele Bazaar, Madulla, Madumana, Maha Aswedduma, Maha Pattapola, Mahagama Egodagama, Mahagama Megodagama, Mahaiyawa, Mahakumbura, Mahalakotuwa, Mahanuvara, Mahanuwara, Mahara, Mahawala, Mahawatta, Mahawela, WattegamMahiyangana, Mailapitiya Lower, Mailapitiya Upper, Maiyangana, Makeliyawala, Makempe, Makuldeniya, Makulussa Colony, Malagammana, Malagekumbura, Malanwatta, Maldeniya, Malgammana, Malgandeniya, Malhewa, Maligatenna, Maliyadda, Malulla, Malwanahinna, Mampitiya, Manaboda, Manahinda, Manakola, Mandandawela, Mandaran Newara, Mangalagama, Mangoda, Manilwala, Mapanawatura, Mapanawatura, Maradurawala, Maraka, Marakkalagama, Marassana, Maratugoda, Maratuwela, Marawanagoda, Martuwela, Maruddana, Marukona, Maskeliya, Maswela, Matalapitiya, Matale, Matale Polwatta, Matale Town, Matgamuwa, Mathgamuwa, Maturata, Mawatagama, Mawatapola, Mawatupola, Mawatupola, Mawatura, Mawela, Mawilmada, Meda-Ela, Medabedda, Medagahawatura, Medagama, Medagammedda, Medagoda, Medakanda, Medakele, Medakumbura, Medapihilla, Medapititenna, Medapitiya, Medawala, Meddegoda, Meddehinna, Medilla, Medilletenna, Mediriya, Mediwaka, Mediyapola, Meepitiya, Mellagola, Menikbowa, Menikdiwela, Menikhinna, Menikhinna Town, Metagama, Methagama, Metibembiya, Metibokka, Metideniya, Metihakka, Metiwalatenna, Mideniya, Migahahena, Migammana, Migammana Ihalagammedda, Migammana Mahagammedda, Migammana Pallegama, Migaskotuwa, Millapitiya, Millawana, Millawana Ihalagama, Millawana Pahalagama, Mimura, Mimure, Minigamuwa, Minipe, Minuwangamuwa, Mipitiya, Mirahampe, Mirissala, Miriyakada, Miruppa, Mitalawa, Miwaladeniya, Miwatura, Miyanagolla, Miyanakolamada, Moladanda, Molagoda, Monaruwila, Moragahamula, Moragahamulla, Moragahaulpota, Moragaspitiya, Moragolla, Moragolleyaya, Morahenegama, Morape, Morape Pallegammedda, Morape Udagammedda, Motamure, Mottuwela

== N ==
Nabadagahawatta, Nagahapola, Nagahatenna, Nagasena, Nagolla (7°22'N 80°52'E), Nalanda (7°31'N 80°34'E), Namadagala, Nanu Oya, Nanumure, Napana Disaneggammedda, Napana Disanekgammedda, Napana Hunuangegammedda, Napatawela, Narandanda, Narangolla, Narangomuwa, Naranpanawa, Naranpanawa Dembatagolla, Naranpanawa Disaneggammedda, Naranpanawa Egodagammedda, Naranpanawa Kandegammedda, Naranpanawa Karagastenna, Naranpanawe Dembatagolla, Naranpanawe Disanekgammedda, Naranpanawe Egodagammedda, Naranpanawe Kandegammedda, Naranpanawe Karagastenna, Narantalawa, Naranwala (7°22'N 80°30'E), Naranwala (7°13'N 80°34'E), Naranwita, Nattarampota, Naula, Navangama, Nawalapitiya, Nawangama, Nawaragoda, Nawayalatenna, Nawayalatenna Bazaar, Nawela, Nayakumbura, Nehiniwala, Nelugolla, Neluwakanda, Nikagolla, Nikahetiya, Nikatenna (7°19'N 80°28'E), Nikatenna (7°22'N 80°31'E), Nikatenna (7°19'N 80°37'E), Nikawatawana, Nikawehera, Nikawella, Nilagama, Nilawala, Nildandahinna, Nilgala, Nillambe, Nira-ella, Nittawela, Nittultenna, Nituletenna, Nitulgahakotuwa, Niyambepola, Niyangama, Niyangandara, Niyangandora, Niyangoda, Niyarepola, Norton, Norton Bridge, Norwood, Norwood Bazaar, Nugahapola, Nugaliyadda, Nugapitiya, Nugatenna, Nugatota, Nugawela, Nugawelagammedda, Nugetenna, Nuwara Dodanwala, Nuwara Dodanwela, Nuwara Eliya, Nuwara Eliya Town, Nuwari-Eliya

== O ==
Oggomuwa, Ogodapola, Olaganwatta, Old Peradeniya, Oligama, Oluwawatta, Opalagala, Opalgala, Opalgalawatta, Opalla, Otagama, Otalawa, Ovisa, Owalapolwatta, Owisa, Oyatenna

== P ==
Padeniya, Padiwitagama, Padiwitawela, Padiyapelella, Paduangoda, Padupola, Paduwangoda, Pahaladiggala, Pahalagammedda, Pahalakande Bavulana, Pahalawela, Pahalawewa, Paladoraella, Palagolla, Palapatwela, Palawa, Paldeniya, Palipana, Palkade, Palkumbura (Udunuwara Divisional Secretariat), Palkumbura (Yatinuwara Divisional Secretariat), Pallama, Palle Aludeniya, Palle Deltota, Palle Galadebokka, Palle Hapuwida, Palle Henepola, Palle Ihagama, Palle Mailapitiya, Palle Makuruppe, Palle Talawinna, Palle Talawinna Udagammedda, Palle Weragama, Palleaswedduma, Pallegama, Pallegama Ihalagammedda, Pallegama Pahalagammedda, Pallegammedda, Pallehaduwa, Pallehena, Pallekanda, Pallekele Kadawidiya, Pallemaoya, Pallepola, Palletenna, Pallewatta, Pallewela, Palleyaya, Palu Rotawewa, Palugama, Palukopiwatta, Pamunudeniya, Pamunuwa, Panabokke, Panangammana, Pananwala, Panatale, Panawelulla, Pangala, Pangollamada, Pannagama, Pannala, Pannala I, Pannala II, Pannampitiya, Pannanpitiya, Panwatta, Panwila, Panwila Town, Panwilatenna, Paradeka, Paragahamada, Paragahawela, Paragoda, Parakatawella, Paranagama, Paranagama Hapukotuwegammedda, Paranagama Mandandawela, Patkolagolla, Pattitalawa, Pattiwela, Pattiyamulla, Pattunupitiya, Payingomuwa, Pelawa, Pelena, Pelenegama, Pellepitiya, Penahetipola, Penalaboda, Penideniya, Peradeniya, Petiyagoda, Piharallegama, Pilapitiya, Pilawala, Piligalla, Piligama, Pilihudugolla, Pilihudugolla Ihalagama, Pilihudugolla Pahalagama, Piliwela, Pinnalandawatta, Pinnawala, Pitakanda, Pitawala, Pitiyagedera, Pitunugama, Poddalgoda, Poddalgoda Megodagama, Pohaliyadda, Poholiadda, Pohoranwewayaya, Pokunuwatta, Polgaha-anga, Polgahange, Polgolla, Polmalagama, Polommana, Polpitiya, Polwatta, Polwatta Colony, Polwatte Ihalagama, Polwattekanda, Poppitiya, Potawa, Pottatawela, Pottepitiya, Pottila, Pubbarawela, Pubbiliya, Puliyadda, Pulleniwatta, Punchlrambadagalla, Pundaloya, Pundaluoya, Punduloya, Pupuressa, Puraamkumbura, Purankumbura, Purijjala, Pussalagolla, Pussalakandura, Pussalamankada, Pussella, Pussellagolla, Pussellawa, Pusulpitiya, Puwakgahagala, Puwakpitiya

== R ==
Rabbegamuwa, Radagoda, Radewala, Radunnewela, Ragala, Rahatungoda, Raitalawa, Raitalawela, Rambawela, Ramboda, Rambuke, Rambukella, Rambukewela, Rambukkewela, Rambukkoluwa, Rambukpitiya, Rambukpota, Rambukpota-anga, Rambukwella, Rammalaka, Rammalakandura, Ranamure, Ranatalawa, Ranawa, Ranawana, Rangala, Rangama, Rangomuwa, Rankiriyagolla, Rannantalawa, Ranwantalawa, Ranwediyawa, Rasingolla, Rassagoda, Ratalawewa, Ratmalakaduwa, Ratmeewala, Ratmiwala, Ratninda, Ratninda, Rattota, Ratwatta, Rawanagoda, Rekatwala, Rekitipe, Retiyagama, Ridiella, Rikillagaskada, Rilamulla, Rogersongama, Rottipehilla, Rozella, Rupaha, Rusigama

== S ==
Samarakonehena, Sangilipalam, Sangilipalama, Selagama, Selagama Colony, Serudandapola, Serugolla, Singhapitiya, Sinhapitiya, Sirangahawatta, Sirimalwatta, Sita Eliya, Sivurupitiya, Siyambalagahawela, Siyambalagastenna, Siyambalagoda, Siyambalapitiya, Siyambalawewa, Suduhakurugama, Suriyagoda

== T ==
Talagasyaya, Talagoda, Talagune, Talakiriyagama, Talakiriyagma, Talakiriyawa, Talakolawela, Talapelellagoda, Talatuoya, Talawakele, Talawatta, Talawatura, Talgahagoda, Tammitiya, Taralanda, Tawalantenna (7°4'N 80°40'E), Tawalantenna (7°13'N 80°47'E), Telambugahawatta, Teldeniya, Teldiniya, Telihunna, Tembiligala Pallegama, Tembiligala Udagama, Tenna, Tennehena, Tennehenwala, Tennekumbura, Tepugolla, Teripaha, Teripehagama, Thine Kanuwa, Thinniyagala, Thumbara, Tibbotugoda, Tibbotuwawa, Tientsin, Tillicoultry, Tinipitigama, Tiniyagala, Tirappuwa, Tismada, Tismoda, Tispane, Tittapajjala, Tiyambara-ambe, Torapitiya, Tumpelawaka, Tumpelawake, Tundeniya, Tunhitiyawa, Tunoathliyadda

== U ==
Uda Aludeniya, Uda Aramba, Udadumbara, Uda Galadebokke, Uda Hapuwida, Uda Henepola, Uda Iluka, Uda Madapota, Uda Mailapitiya, Uda Makuruppe, Uda Pussellawa, Uda Pussellawa Estate, Uda Talawinna, Uda Talawinna Megodagammedda, Uda Talawinnamadige, Uda Weragama, Udabowala, Udagaladebokka, Udagalauda, Udagama, Udagama Pallegama, Udagammedda, Udahaduwa, Udahentenna, Udakottamulla, Udakumbura, Udalugama, Udalugaputenna, Udalumada, Udamadura, Udamaluwa, Udamulla, Udangomuwa, Udapadiyapelella, Udapitawela, Udatenna, Udattawa, Udawatta, Udawela, Udispattuwa, Udowita, Udu Nuwara and Yatinuwara, Ududaha, Ududeniya, Ududeniya Madige, Ududeniya Sinhalagama, Udugalpitiye Kuppayama, Udugama, Udugoda, Udumulla, Udupihilla, Udurawana, Udurawana Megodagammedda, Uduwa, Uduwawala, Uduwela Pallegama, Uduwela Udagama, Uduwella, Uduwelwala, Uduwerella, Uggahakumbura, Uguresapitiya, Uguressapitiya, Ukutule, Ukuwala, Ukuwela, Ulakkonde, Ulandupitiya, Ulapane, Ullandupitiya, Ullekumbura, Ulpotagama, Ulpotagama Iluka, Ulpotapitiya, Unagolla, Unambuwa, Unantenna Pallegammedda, Unantenna Pallegammedde, Unapandureyaya, Unaweruwa, Upcot, Uradeniya, Urapola, Urawala, Urawela, Urugala, Urugalakadawidiya, Uruherapola, Urulemulla, Urulewatta, Ussettawa

== V ==
Vetastenna, Viguhumpola, Vilana Pallegama, Vilana Udagama,

== W ==
Wadagolla, Wadakahamada, Wadawala, Wadawalakanda, Wademada, Wadiya, Wadiyagoda, Wahacotte, Waharakgoda, Wahugepitiya, Wahunkoho, Wahunkoha, Wahupitiya, Waikkal, Walagama, Walagedara, Walakumbura, Walakumbura, Walala, Walala Megodagammedda, Walalawela, Walaswewa, Walatalawa, Walawela, Waldeniya, Walgama, Walgampaya, Walgovuwagoda, Walgowagoda, Wallahagoda, Walliwela, Walmoruwa, Walpola, Walpoladeniya, Walpolamulla, Walugama, Wanduramulla, Wannipola, Waradiwala, Waragashinna, Warakadeniya, Warakagoda, Warakalawita, Warakamure, Warakawa, Waralaggama, Warapitiya, Wariyapola, Wataddora, Watadeniya, Watagoda, Watapana, Watapuluwa, Watawala, Wathumulla, Wattahena, Wattappola, Wattegama, Wattegammedda, Wattegedara, Wattehena, Watuliyadda, Watumulla, Watupola, Waturakumbura, Watuwala, Wavinna, Wawinna, Wayikkal, Wedagolla, Wedigammedda, Wegala, Wegama, Wegama Lower, Wegiriya, Wegodapola, Wehera, Wehigala East, Wekanda, Wekumbura, Welagama, Welaihala Udugoda, Welamboda, Welampe, Welandagoda, Welangahawatta, Welapahala, Welata, Welegedara, Welemulla, Welgahawadiya, Weligalla, Weliganwala, Weligodapola, Weliketiya, Welivitta, Weliwaranagolla, Weliwita, Weliwita Ihalagama, Weliwita Pahalagama, Wellagiriya, Wellangolla, Wellatota, Welletota Kadaweediya, Welpanala, Wepatana, Weragalawatta, Weragama, Weragamtota, Weragantota, Weralanda, Weralugastenna, Werapitiya, Werapitiya Ihalagama, Werapitiya Pahalagammedda, Werawala, Werella, Werellagama, West Watta, Wetagepota, Wetakedeniya, Wetakepotha, Wetalawa, Wetasseyaya, Weteggama, Wettehena, Wettewa, Wewagammedda, Wewakele, Wewala, Wewatenna, Wewelmada, Wewelobe, Wiguhumpola, Wijebahukanda, Wilawala, Wilgomuwa, Wilwala, Wiyanamulla

== Y ==
Yaggala, Yahala, Yahalatenne, Yahaletenna, Yakadagoda, Yakgahapitiya, Yakkuragala, Yalegoda, Yalkumbura, Yamanmulla, Yapagama, Yasanampura, Yatala, Yatapana, Yatawara, Yatawatta, Yatawatta, Yatigammana, Yatihalagala, Yatihalagala Pallegama, Yatimadura, Yatipiyangala, Yatirawana, Yatiwawala, Yatiwehera, Yatiwella, Yattakule, Yodagannawa, Yombuweltenna, Yompana, Yonpane

== See also ==
- List of cities in Sri Lanka
- List of towns in Sri Lanka
