= Yompana =

Coordinates: 7°02′N 80°57′E

Maspanna
- Village
- Interactive map of Maspanna
- Country: Sri Lanka
- Province: Uva Province
- Time zone: UTC+5:30 (Sri Lanka Standard Time)
- Postal code: 90328

Maspanna is a village in Sri Lanka. It is located within Uva Province.

== See also ==
- List of towns in Central Province, Sri Lanka
