= Ambatalawa, Nuwara Eliya district =

Village in Sri Lanka

Ambatalawa
- Village
- Location within Sri Lanka
- Coordinates: 6°58′0″N 80°30′0″E
- Country: Sri Lanka
- Province: Central Province
- Time zone: UTC+5:30 (Sri Lanka Standard Time)

Ambatalawa is a village in Sri Lanka. It is located within Central Province.

== See also ==
- List of towns in Central Province, Sri Lanka
