= Gollangolla =

Coordinates: 7°15′N 80°33′E

- Village
- Interactive map of Gollangolla
- Country: Sri Lanka
- Province: Central Province
- Time zone: UTC+5:30 (Sri Lanka Standard Time)

Gollangolla is a village located within Central Province in Sri Lanka.

== See also ==
- List of towns in Central Province, Sri Lanka
