= Naranpanawa Karagastenna =

Coordinates: 7°20′N 80°44′E

- Village
- Interactive map of Naranpanawa Karagastenna
- Country: Sri Lanka
- Province: Central Province
- Time zone: UTC+5:30 (Sri Lanka Standard Time)

Naranpanawa Karagastenna is a village in the Central Provinceof in Sri Lanka.

== See also ==
- List of towns in Central Province, Sri Lanka
