= Legundeniya =

Coordinates: 7°10′N 80°38′E

- Village
- Interactive map of Legundeniya
- Country: Sri Lanka
- Province: Central Province
- Time zone: UTC+5:30 (Sri Lanka Standard Time)

Legundeniya is a village in Sri Lanka.

== Location ==
It is located within Central Province.

== See also ==
- List of towns in Central Province, Sri Lanka
