= Wijebahukanda =

Coordinates: 7°01′N 80°37′E

- Village
- Interactive map of Wijebahukanda
- Country: Sri Lanka
- Province: Central Province
- Time zone: UTC+5:30 (Sri Lanka Standard Time)

Wijebahukanda is a village in the Central Province of Sri Lanka.

== See also ==
- List of settlements in Central Province (Sri Lanka)
