= Pellepitiya =

Coordinates: 7°07′N 80°32′E

- Village
- Interactive map of Pellepitiya
- Country: Sri Lanka
- Province: Central Province
- Time zone: UTC+5:30 (Sri Lanka Standard Time)

Pellepitiya is a village located in the Central Province, in Sri Lanka.

== See also ==
- List of towns in Central Province, Sri Lanka
