= Uda Talawinna Megodagammedda =

Coordinates: 7°21′N 80°38′E

Uda Talawinna
- Village
- Interactive map of Uda Talawinna
- Country: Sri Lanka
- Province: Central Province
- Time zone: UTC+5:30 (Sri Lanka Standard Time)

Uda Talawinna Megodagammedda, also known as Udatalawinna, is a village in Sri Lanka. It is located within Central Province. The majority of the population is Sinhala.

== See also ==
- List of towns in Central Province, Sri Lanka
