= Giraulla =

Coordinates: 7°08′N 80°32′E

- Village
- Interactive map of Giraulla
- Country: Sri Lanka
- Province: north western Province
- Time zone: UTC+5:30 (Sri Lanka Standard Time)

Giraulla is a village in Sri Lanka. It is located within north western Province.

== See also ==
- List of towns in Central Province, Sri Lanka
