= Naranpanawe Kandegammedda =

Coordinates: 7°21′N 80°44′E

- Village
- Interactive map of Naranpanawe Kandegammedda
- Country: Sri Lanka
- Province: Central Province
- Time zone: UTC+5:30 (Sri Lanka Standard Time)

Naranpanawe Kandegammedda is a village in Sri Lanka. It is located within Central Province. Naranpanawe Kandegammedda is a place with a very small population in the province of Central, Sri Lanka which is located in the continent/region of Asia. Cities, towns and places near Naranpanawe Kandegammedda include Naranpanawa, Naranpanawe Egodagammedda, Naranpanawa Kandegammedda and Naranpanawa Egodagammedda. The closest major cities include Colombo, Tirunelveli, Nagercoil and Madurai.

== See also ==
- List of towns in Central Province, Sri Lanka
