= Giddawa =

- Village
- Location in Sri Lanka
- Coordinates: 7°20′41″N 80°44′23″E
- Country: Sri Lanka
- Province: Central Province
- Time zone: UTC+5:30 (Sri Lanka Standard Time)

Giddawa is a village in Sri Lanka. It is located within Central Province.

A 2.0 MW hydroelectric dam is located in the village.

== See also ==
- List of towns in Central Province, Sri Lanka
