= Gunnepana Madige =

Coordinates: 7°20′N 80°39′E

- Village
- Interactive map of Gunnepana Madige
- Country: Sri Lanka
- Province: Central Province
- Time zone: UTC+5:30 (Sri Lanka Standard Time)

Gunnepana Madige is a village in Sri Lanka. It is located within Central Province. It lies in the Pathadumbara Divisional Secretariat area.

Some nearby reference points are Polgolla Barrage, Nittawela Rugby Stadium, and proximity to the city of Kandy are mentioned in mapping context.

== See also ==
- List of towns in Central Province, Sri Lanka
