= Hapugaspitiya =

Coordinates: 7°10′N 80°34′E

- Village
- Interactive map of Hapugaspitiya
- Country: Sri Lanka
- Province: Central Province
- Time zone: UTC+5:30 (Sri Lanka Standard Time)

Hapugaspitiya is a village in Sri Lanka. It is located within Central Province.

== Culture and Community ==
Hapugaspitiya is home to a diverse population that reflects Sri Lank's multi-religious and multicultural fabric. Religious harmony is visible in the presence of both temples and churches, with the community actively participating in religious and cultural festivities.

== See also ==
- List of towns in Central Province, Sri Lanka
