= Warakawa =

- Village
- Location in Sri Lanka
- Coordinates: 7°05′N 80°32′E
- Country: Sri Lanka
- Province: Central Province
- District: Kandy (replace with the actual district name)

Area
  - Land: 705 sq mi (1,825 km^{2})

Population (2024)
  - Total: 2,189
- Time zone: UTC+5:30 (Sri Lanka Standard Time)

Warakawa is a village in Sri Lanka. It is located within Central Province.

The population was 2,189 in 2024

== See also ==
- List of towns in Central Province, Sri Lanka
