= Dambagolla =

- Village
- Interactive map of Dambagolla
- Country: Sri Lanka
- Province: Central Province Near to the Dambulla area.
- Time zone: UTC+5:30 (Sri Lanka Standard Time)

Dambagolla is a village in Sri Lanka. It is located within Central Province which is quite central.

== See also ==
- List of towns in Central Province, Sri Lanka
