= Millawana Pahalagama =

Coordinates: 7°40′N 80°35′E

Millawana
- Village
- Interactive map of Millawana
- Country: Sri Lanka
- Province: Central Province
- Time zone: UTC+5:30 (Sri Lanka Standard Time)

Millawana is a well known populated locality situated in the Central Province of Sri Lanka which lies in the Asia continent/region. Its neighboring areas include Nagahapola, Welemulla, Kobbewehera, and Kandewatta.

The significant cities near Millawana are Pallepola, Melsiripura, Galewela, and Matale.

== See also ==
- List of towns in Central Province, Sri Lanka
