= Kongahawela =

- Village
- Interactive map of Kongahawela
- Country: Sri Lanka
- Province: Central Province
- Time zone: UTC+5:30 (Sri Lanka Standard Time)

Kongahawela is a village in Sri Lanka. It is located within Central Province.

== See also ==
- List of towns in Central Province, Sri Lanka
- Find Kongahawela on Google Map

https://www.google.com/maps/place/Kongahawela,+Sri+Lanka/@7.6904499,80.6987856,14z/data=!3m1!4b1!4m5!3m4!1s0x3afcaca94e1c9075:0xe013114b5d7bcab0!8m2!3d7.6897523!4d80.7158977
