= Walawela =

- Village
- Interactive map of Walawela
- Coordinates: 7.5222°N 80.5973°E
- Country: Sri Lanka
- Province: Central Province
- Time zone: UTC+5:30 (Sri Lanka Standard Time)

Walawela is a village in Sri Lanka. It is located within Central Province with postal code of 21048.

== See also ==
- List of towns in Central Province, Sri Lanka
