= Halgolla =

- Village
- Interactive map of Halgolla
- Country: Sri Lanka
- Province: Central Province
- Time zone: UTC+5:30 (Sri Lanka Standard Time)

Halgolla is a village in Sri Lanka. It is located within Central Province, in Kandy District. It is about 26 km away from Kandy. It is situated 4 km from Ankumbura. It is administrated by Pujapitiya divisional secretariat.

== See also ==
- List of towns in Central Province, Sri Lanka
