= Irahanda =

Coordinates: 7°07′N 80°31′E

Irahanda Cabs & tours
- Village
- Interactive map of Irahanda Cabs & tours
- Country: Sri Lanka
- Province: Central Province
- Time zone: UTC+5:30 (Sri Lanka Standard Time)
- Website: www.irahandacabs.com

Irahanda is a village in Sri Lanka. It is located within Central Province.

== See also ==
- List of towns in Central Province, Sri Lanka
