= Gurulupota =

Coordinates: 7°20′N 80°56′E

- Village
- Interactive map of Gurulupota
- Country: Sri Lanka
- Province: Central Province
- Time zone: UTC+5:30 (Sri Lanka Standard Time)

Gurulupota is a village in Sri Lanka. It is located within Central Province. The 8th-century Gurulupota Archaeological site is located in this village on the wayside of the Kandy-Mahiyangana road near the 18 hairpin bend.

== See also ==
- List of towns in Central Province, Sri Lanka
