= Bulukohotenna =

Coordinates: 7°22′N 80°36′E

- Village
- Interactive map of Bulukohotenna
- Country: Sri Lanka
- Province: Central Province
- Time zone: UTC+5:30 (Sri Lanka Standard Time)

Bulukohotenna is a village in Sri Lanka. It is located within Central Province. It is home for many people.

== See also ==
- List of towns in Central Province, Sri Lanka
