= Andawala =

- Village
- Interactive map of Andawala
- Coordinates: 7°36′58″N 80°40′42″E
- Country: Sri Lanka
- Province: Central Province
- Time zone: UTC+5:30 (Sri Lanka Standard Time)

Andawala is a remote village in Sri Lanka's Central Province. There are 3 roads to access Andawala by a vehicle. First is via Matale, Madawala Uplatha and others are via Naula, Ambana or Opalgala. Many villagers are farmers and few are working as government officers. There is a trekking to Riverston via Andawala. Therefore, many visitors come for adventure travel.

There are two Buddhist temples in the village, and one was built in 1800s. Approximately, 400 families live there.

== See also ==
- List of towns in Central Province, Sri Lanka
