= Ambaliyadda =

Village in Sri Lanka

Coordinates: 7°1′N 80°54′E

Ambaliyadda (7°1'N 80°54'E)
- Village
- Interactive map of Ambaliyadda (7°1'N 80°54'E)
- Country: Sri Lanka
- Province: Central Province
- Time zone: UTC+5:30 (Sri Lanka Standard Time)

Ambaliyadda (7°1'N 80°54'E) is a village in Sri Lanka. It is located within Central Province.

== See also ==
- List of towns in Central Province, Sri Lanka
