= Halminiya =

Coordinates: 7°31′N 80°50′E

- Village
- Interactive map of Halminiya
- Country: Sri Lanka
- Province: Central Province
- Time zone: UTC+5:30 (Sri Lanka Standard Time)

Halminiya is a village in Central Province, Sri Lanka.

== See also ==
- List of towns in Central Province, Sri Lanka
