= Metagama =

- Village
- Interactive map of Metagama
- Coordinates: 7°01′N 80°38′E
- Country: Sri Lanka
- Province: Central Province
- Time zone: UTC+5:30 (Sri Lanka Standard Time)

Metagama is a village in Nuwara Eliya District in Sri Lanka. It is located within Central Province.

== See also ==
- List of towns in Central Province, Sri Lanka
