= Pilihudugolla Ihalagama =

Coordinates: 7°42′N 80°39′E

- Village
- Interactive map of Pilihudugolla Ihalagama
- Country: Sri Lanka
- Province: Central Province
- Time zone: UTC+5:30 (Sri Lanka Standard Time)

Pilihudugolla Ihalagama is a village in Sri Lanka. It is in Central Province.

== See also ==
- List of towns in Central Province, Sri Lanka
