= Pussella =

Village in Sri Lanka

Coordinates: 7°16′N 80°21′E

Pussella is a village situated about 8 km away from Mawathagama in Sri Lanka.
