= Weralugastenna =

Coordinates: 7°31′N 80°42′E

- Village
- Interactive map of Weralugastenna
- Country: Sri Lanka
- Province: Central Province
- Time zone: UTC+5:30 (Sri Lanka Standard Time)

Weralugastenna is a village in Sri Lanka. It is located within Central Province.
