= Kandy =

Second largest city in Sri Lanka

Kandy මහනුවර (Sinhala) கண்டி (Tamil)
- Administrative capital city
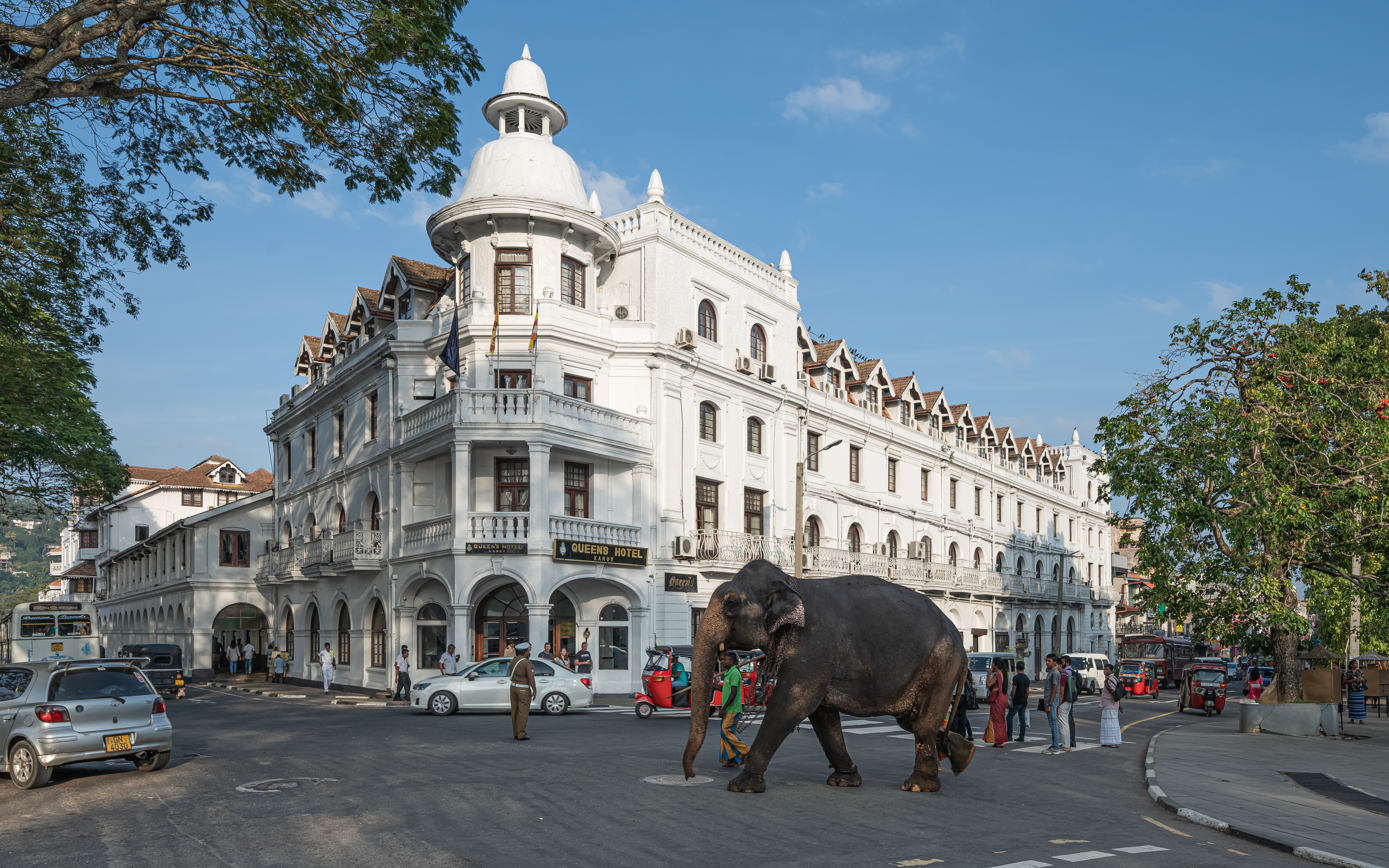
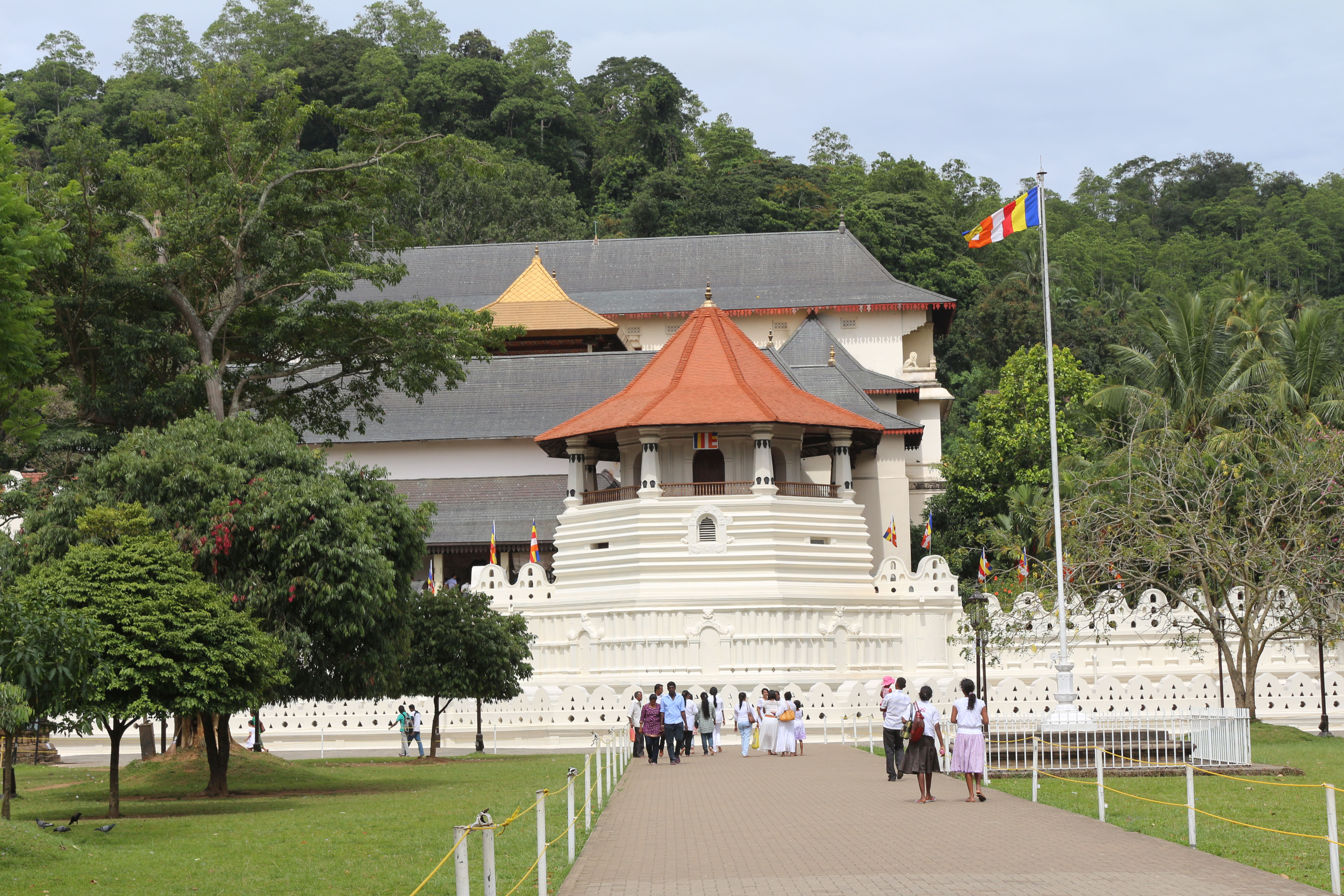
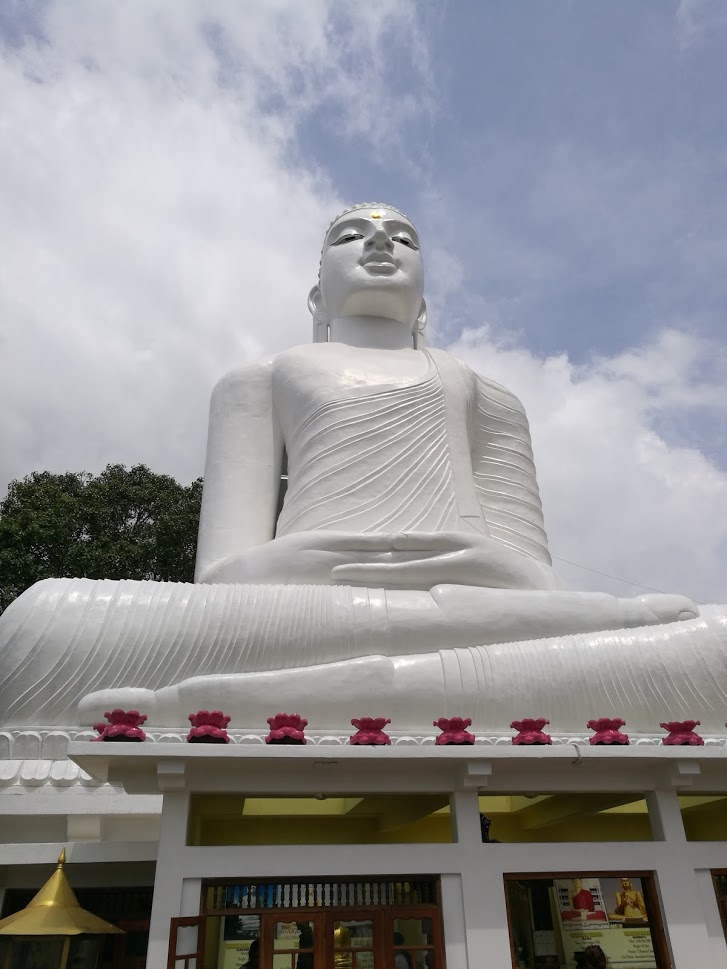
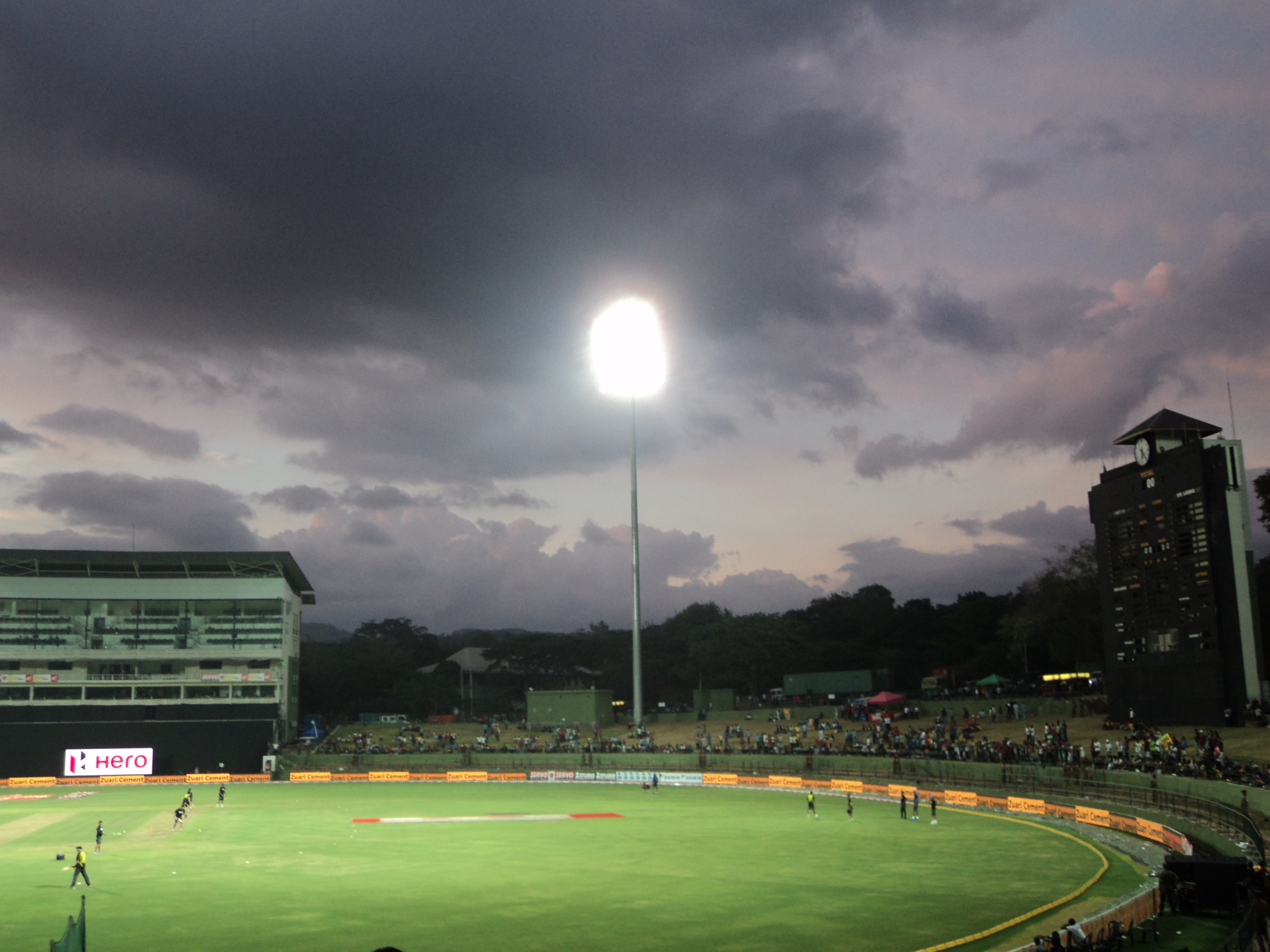
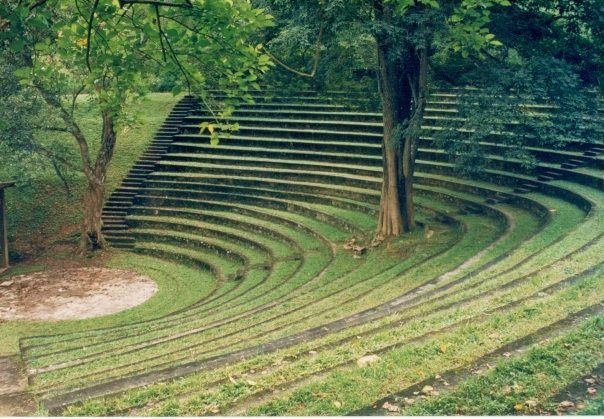
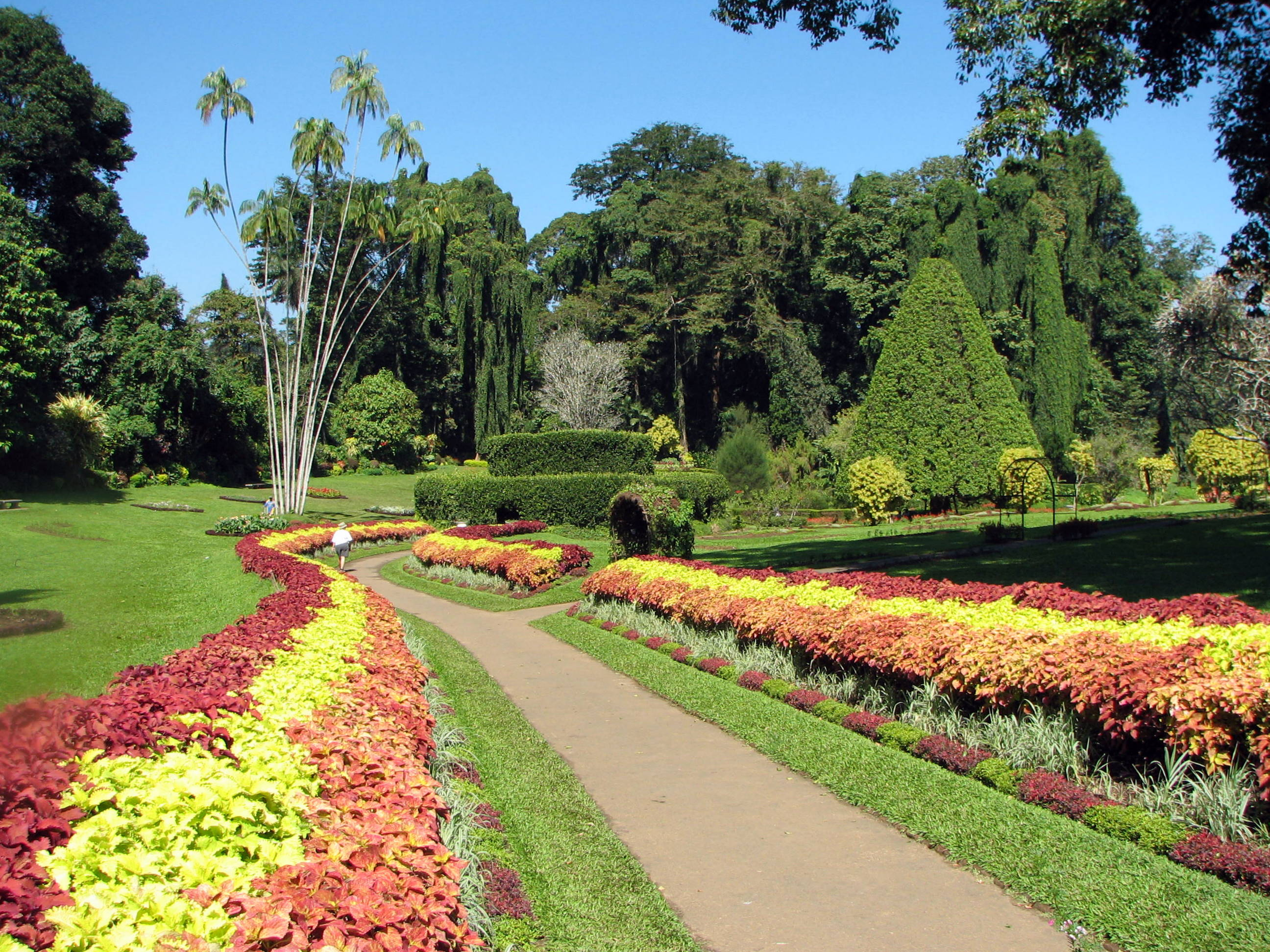
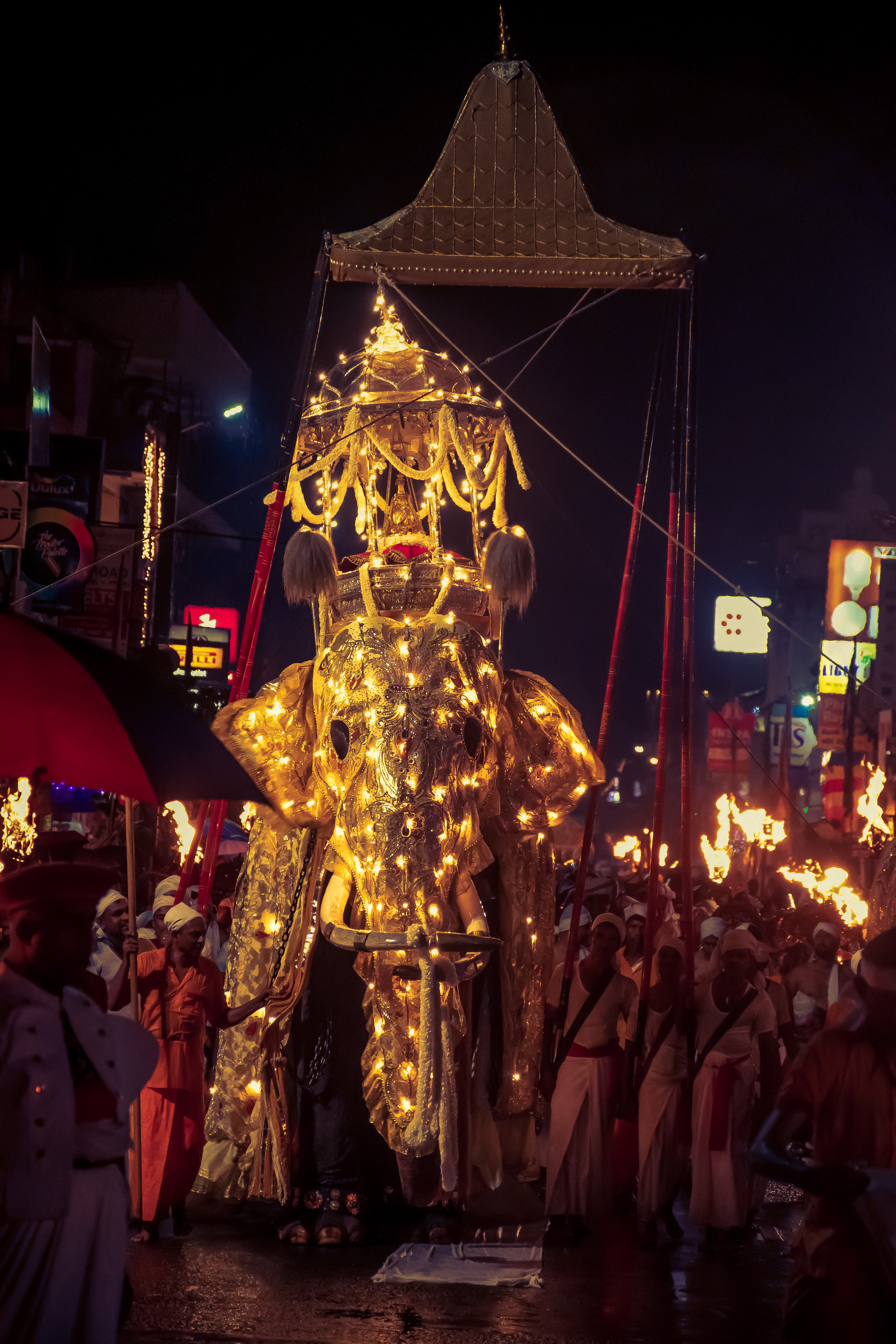
- Downtown Kandy Temple of the Tooth Bahirawakanda Temple Pallekele International Cricket Stadium Sarachchandra Open-Air Theatre Royal Botanic Gardens, Peradeniya Kandy Esala Perahera
- Nicknames: Nuwara (Sinhala: නුවර, romanised: Nuwara); Senkadagala (Sinhala: සෙංකඩගල, romanised: Seṁkaḍagala)
- Motto: Loyal and Free
- Location within Sri Lanka Location within South Asia Location within Asia
- Coordinates: 7°17′35″N 80°38′06″E
- Country: Sri Lanka
- Province: Central Province
- District: Kandy District
- Divisional Secretariat: Kandy Four Gravets and Gangawata Korale Divisional Secretariat
- Senkadagalapura: 14th century
- Capital of the Kingdom of Kandy: 1469
- Founder: Senasammata Vikramabahu

Government
  - Type: Municipal Council
  - Body: Kandy Municipal Council
  - Mayor: Chandrasiri Wijenayake (NPP)

UNESCO World Heritage Site
- Criteria: Cultural: iv, vi
- Reference: 450
- Inscription: 1988 (12th Session)

Area
  - Total: 28.53 km^{2} (11.02 sq mi)
- Elevation: 500 m (1,600 ft)

Population (2011)
  - Total: 125,400
  - Density: 4,591/km^{2} (11,890/sq mi)
- Demonym: Kandyan
- Time zone: UTC+05:30 (Sri Lanka Standard Time)
- Postal code: 20000
- Area code: 081
- Website: Kandy Municipal Council

Kandy (Sinhala: මහනුවර, romanised: Mahanuwara [mahanuʋərə]; Tamil: கண்டி, romanised: Kaṇṭi [ˈkaɳɖi]) is a major city located in the Central Province of Sri Lanka. It was the last capital of the Sinhalese monarchy from 1469 to 1818, under the Kingdom of Kandy. The city is situated in the midst of hills in the Kandy plateau. Kandy is the administrative capital of the Central Province, and considered as the cultural capital of Sri Lanka, due to its architectural heritage. Kandy is the home of the Temple of the Tooth Relic (Sri Dalada Maligawa), one of the most important places of the Buddhist world. It was declared a World Heritage Site by UNESCO in 1988. Historically the local Buddhist rulers resisted Portuguese, Dutch, and British colonial expansion and occupation.

== Etymology ==
The city and the region have been known by many different names and versions of those names. Some scholars suggest that the original name of Kandy was Katubulu Nuwara located near the present Watapuluwa. However, the more popular historical name is Senkadagala or Senkadagalapura, officially Senkadagala Siriwardhana Maha Nuwara (meaning 'great city of Senkadagala of growing resplendence'), generally shortened to 'Maha Nuwara'. According to folklore, this name originated from one of the several possible sources. One being the city was named after a brahmin with the name Senkanda who lived in a cave nearby, and another being a queen of Vikramabahu III was named Senkanda, and after a coloured stone named Senkadagala. In addition, there is another idea that the ancient name Senkadagala was born from the name of Lord Vishnu, who was also known as Chenkatan. The Kingdom of Kandy has also been known by various names. The English name Kandy, which originated during the colonial era, is derived from an anglicised version of the Sinhala Kanda Uda Rata (meaning the land on the mountain) or Kanda Uda Pas Rata (the five counties/countries on the mountain). The Portuguese shortened this to "Candea", using the name for both the kingdom and its capital. In Sinhala, Kandy is called Maha Nuwara, meaning "Great City" or "The Capital", although this is most often shortened to Nuwara in daily use.

== History ==
=== Founding ===
Historical records suggest that Kandy was first established by the Parakramabahu III (1357–1374 AD), who was the monarch of the Kingdom of Kurunegala, southeast of the present city, and named Senkadagalapura at the time. Minister and General Siriwardhana built the Asgiri Maha Viharaya in Kandy, which is the oldest establishment in Kandy.

=== Kandyan Kingdom ===
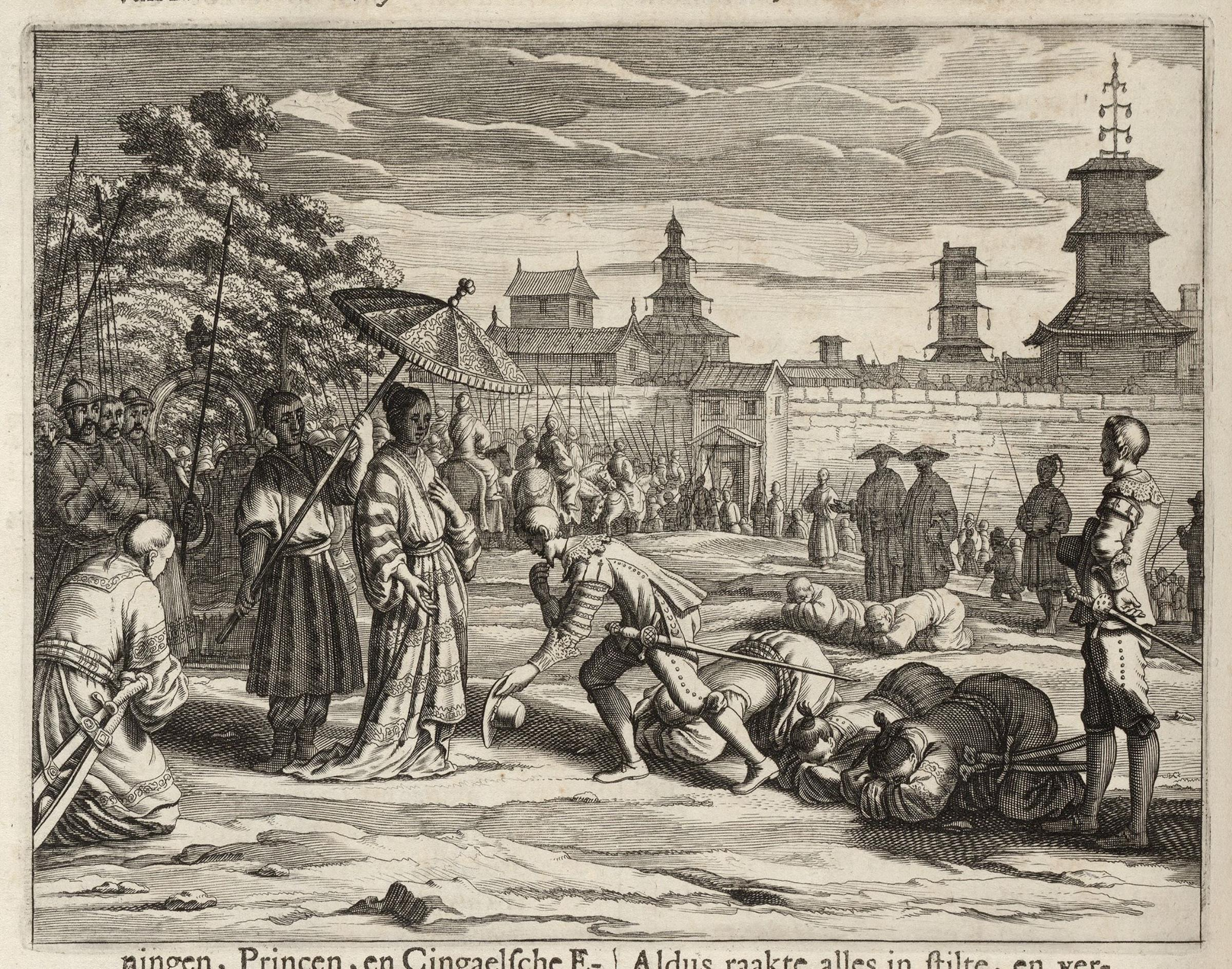
Portuguese governor Pedro Lopes de Sousa welcomes Kusumasana Devi a.k.a. Dona Catharina during the campaign of Danture, 1594

Sena Sammatha Wickramabahu (1473–1511) was the first king of the Kingdom of Kandy. He was a royal from the Kotte Royal Bloodline and ruled Kandy as a semi-independent kingdom under the Kingdom of Kotte, making it the new capital of the Kandyan Kingdom. Sena Sammatha Wickramabahu was followed by his son Jayaweera Astana (1511–1551) and then by Karaliyadde Bandara (1551–1581) who was succeeded by his daughter Dona Catherina of Kandy (1581–1581). Dona Catherina was succeeded by Rajasinha I. Rajasinha I, however, preferred to rule the hill country from the Kingdom of Sitawaka on the west of the island. A period of turmoil for power ended with the ascent to the throne by Konappu Bandara who came to be known as Vimaladharmasuriya I. Having embraced Buddhism, he consolidated his authority further by bringing the tooth relic of the Buddha to Kandy from a place called Delgamuwa.

In 1592 Kandy became the capital city of the last remaining independent kingdom in the island after the coastal regions had been conquered by the Portuguese. Several invasions by the Portuguese were repelled, most notably in the campaign of Danture. After the Sinhalese–Portuguese War and the establishment of Dutch Ceylon, attempts by the Dutch to conquer the kingdom were repelled.

The kingdom tolerated a Dutch presence on the coast of Sri Lanka, although attacks were occasionally launched. The most ambitious offensive was undertaken in 1761, when King Kirti Sri Rajasinha attacked and overran most of the coast, leaving only the heavily fortified Negombo intact. When a Dutch retaliatory force returned to the island in 1763, Kirti Sri Rajasinha abandoned the coastline and withdrew into the interior. When the Dutch continued to the jungles the next year, they were constantly harassed by disease, heat, lack of provisions, and Kandyan sharpshooters, who hid in the jungle and inflicted heavy losses on the Dutch.

The Dutch launched a better-adapted force in January 1765, replacing their troops' bayonets with machetes and using more practical uniforms and tactics suited to jungle warfare. The Dutch were initially successful in capturing the capital, which was deserted, and the Kandyans withdrew to the jungles once more, refusing to engage in open battle. However, the Dutch were again worn down by constant attrition warfare. A peace treaty was signed in 1766. The Dutch remained in control of the coastal areas until 1796, when Great Britain took them over (while the Netherlands was under French control) due to the Kew letters during the Napoleonic wars. British possession of these areas was formalised with the treaty of Amiens in 1802. The next year the British also invaded Kandy in what became known as the First Kandyan War but were repulsed.

As the capital, Kandy had become home to the relic of the tooth of the Buddha which symbolises a 4th-century tradition that used to be linked to the Sinhalese monarchy, since the protector of the relic was the ruler of the land. Thus the Royal Palace and the Temple of the Tooth were placed in close proximity to each other.

The last ruling dynasty of Kandy was the Nayaks. Kandy stayed independent until the early 19th century.

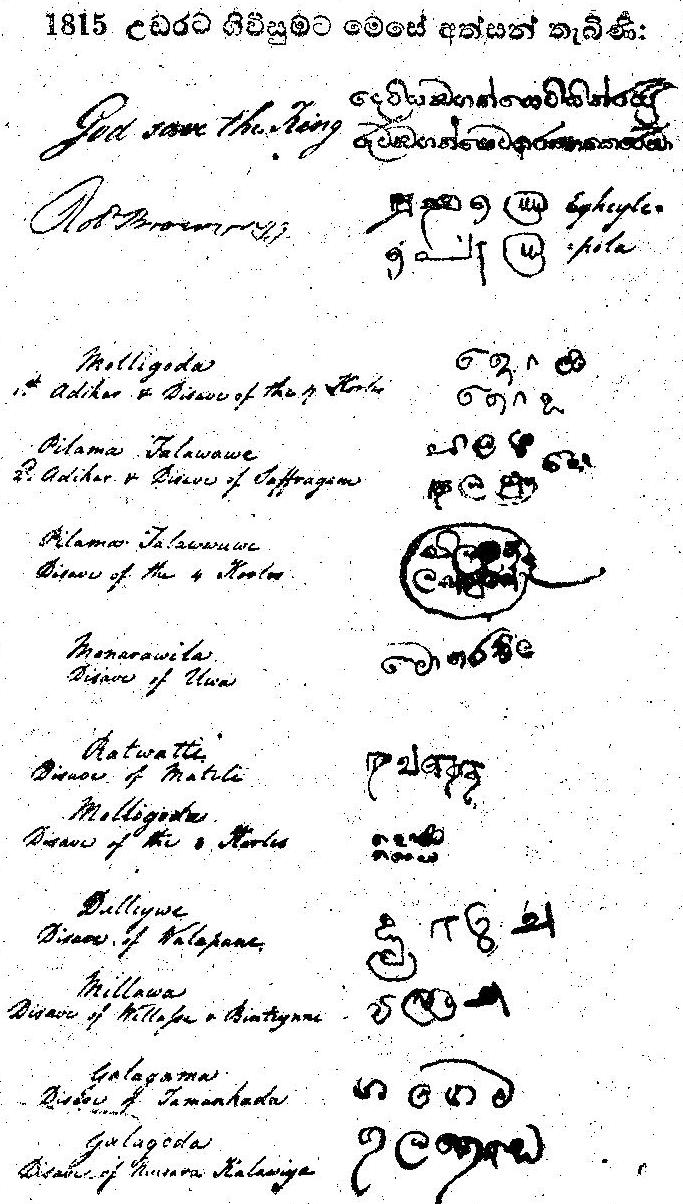
The Kandyan Convention signed between the British and the Kandyan chiefs in 1815

In the Second Kandyan War, the British launched an invasion that met no resistance and reached the city on 10 February 1815. The first time Sri Lanka fully fell into the hands of a foreign power was in Kandy with the signing of the Kandyan Convention in 1815 at the Sri Dalada Maligawa. The king, Vikrama Rajasinha of Kandy who was of South Indian ancestry faced powerful opposition from the Sinhalese chieftains and sought to reduce his power. A successful coup was organised by the Sinhalese chieftains in which they accepted the British crown as their new king. This ended over 2500 years of Sinhalese monarchs and the line of Kandyan monarchs and Rajasinha was taken as prisoner. By 2 March 1815 the island's sovereignty was under that of the British Empire. A treaty known as the Kandyan Convention was signed between the British and the Radalas (Kandyan aristocrats). The treaty was not signed by the deposed King but by members of his court and other dignitaries of the Kandyan Kingdom. With this treaty, Kandy recognised George III as its King and became a British protectorate. The last king of the kingdom Sri Vikrama Rajasinha was captured and taken as a royal prisoner by the British to Vellore Fort in southern India along with all claimants to the throne. Some of the family members were also exiled to Tanjore (now known as Thanjavur, in Tamil Nadu). Their erstwhile living place is still referred to as "Kandy Raja Aranmanai" on the eastern part of Thanjavur town on Old Mariamman Koil Road.

=== Colonial era ===
During the British period in Sri Lanka, the history of Kandy and its townscape witnessed a rapid and drastic change and particularly after the Uva Rebellion. Sir Lowry is noted for recording in his Gazetteer "The story of English rule in the Kandyan country during the rebellion of 1818 cannot be related without shame...Hardly a member of the leading families remained alive...Those whom the sword and the gun had spared, cholera and small pox and privations had slain by the hundreds...Others became ignorant and apathetic. Any subsequent development efforts of the government for many years were only attempts begun and abandoned".

In 1848 led by Gongalegoda Banda and Puran Appu saw the rebellion known as the Matale Rebellion. Prior to that the city and the country had been under British rule for 32 years, during which the British had expropriated the common land of the Kandyan peasantry and reduced them to extreme poverty. The Kandyan villagers were forced to abandon their traditional way of life and become wage-workers in the abominable conditions that prevailed on these new estates and plantations that had been introduced. Despite all the pressure exerted by the colonials, the Kandyans refused. This forced the British to bring in hundreds of thousands of Tamil coolies from southern India.

The rebellion began on 26 July 1848 with Gongalegoda Banda, crowned as king, and Puran Appu, as prime minister, and their main objective was to capture Kandy back from the British. The Matale Rebellion was a peasant revolt in the hands of the Common people, the Kandyan leadership being totally wiped out after the Uva Rebellion, marked the first step in a transition from the classic feudal form of anti-colonial revolt to modern independence struggles. The leadership was for the first time passed from the Kandyan provinces into the hands of ordinary people or non-aristocrats.

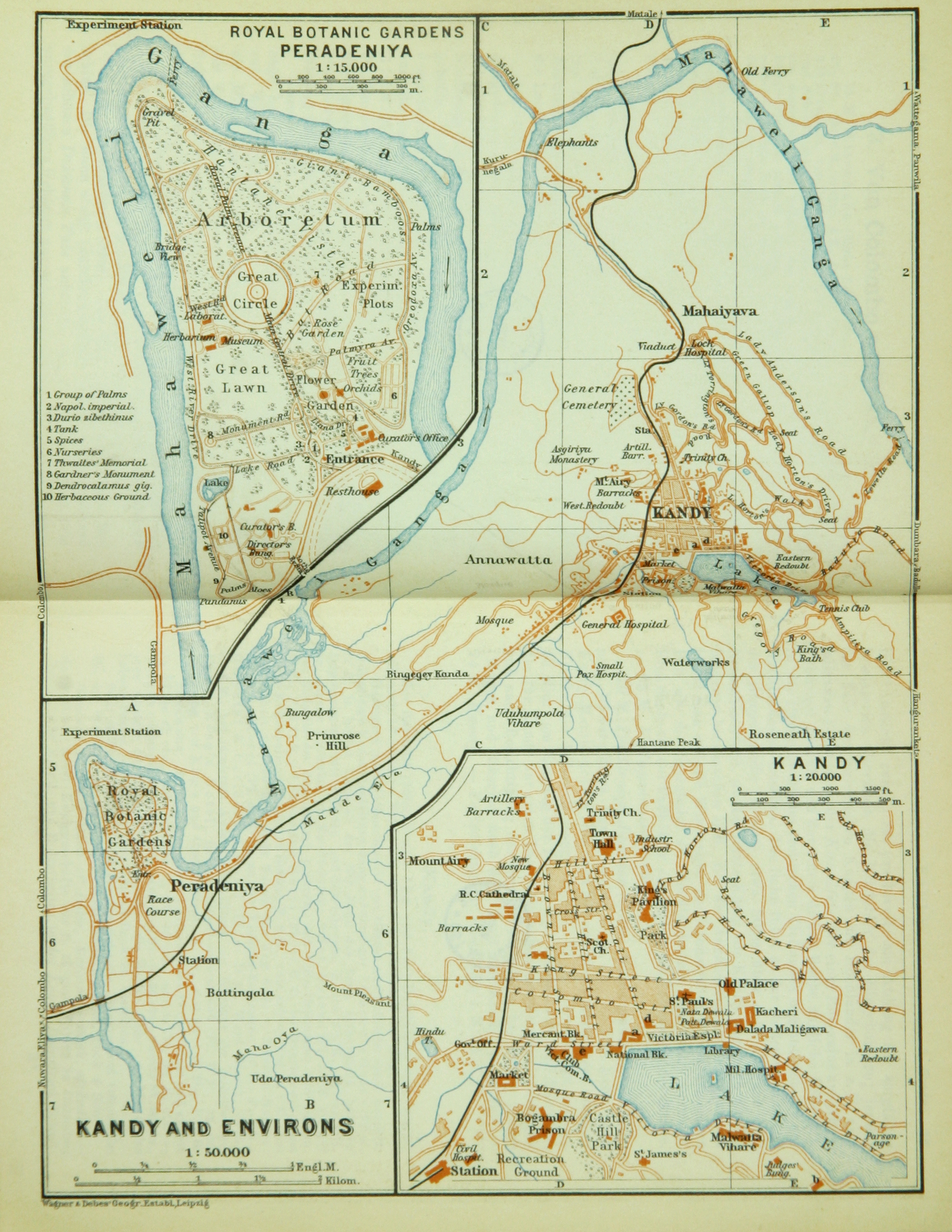
Kandy and environs, incl the Royal Botanic Gardens at Peradeniya, ca 1914

In 1944, during World War II, the South East Asia Command of the allies was moved to Kandy, where it remained until the end of the war.

=== Contemporary Kandy ===
It is the capital of the Central Province of modern Sri Lanka. Its geographic location has made it a major transportation hub in the island: while Kandy being the gateway to the Central Highlands of Sri Lanka, the city can be reached by major motorways in every direction of the island. The railway line from Colombo, the seaport on the western coast runs via Kandy to the farthest point of Badulla in the Central Highlands. The main roads Colombo-Kandy and Kandy-Nuwara Eliya are two of the most scenic roads of Sri Lanka; Colombo-Kandy road passes through the rubber, tea plantations and rice paddies, Kandy-Nuwara Eliya road cuts through paddy fields and seamless tea plantations. Both roads claw their way up winding, rounding over the rings of hills. Currently, feasibility studies are afoot for another highway between Colombo and Kandy via Kadawata and the scenic city of Katugastota.

== Geography and climate ==
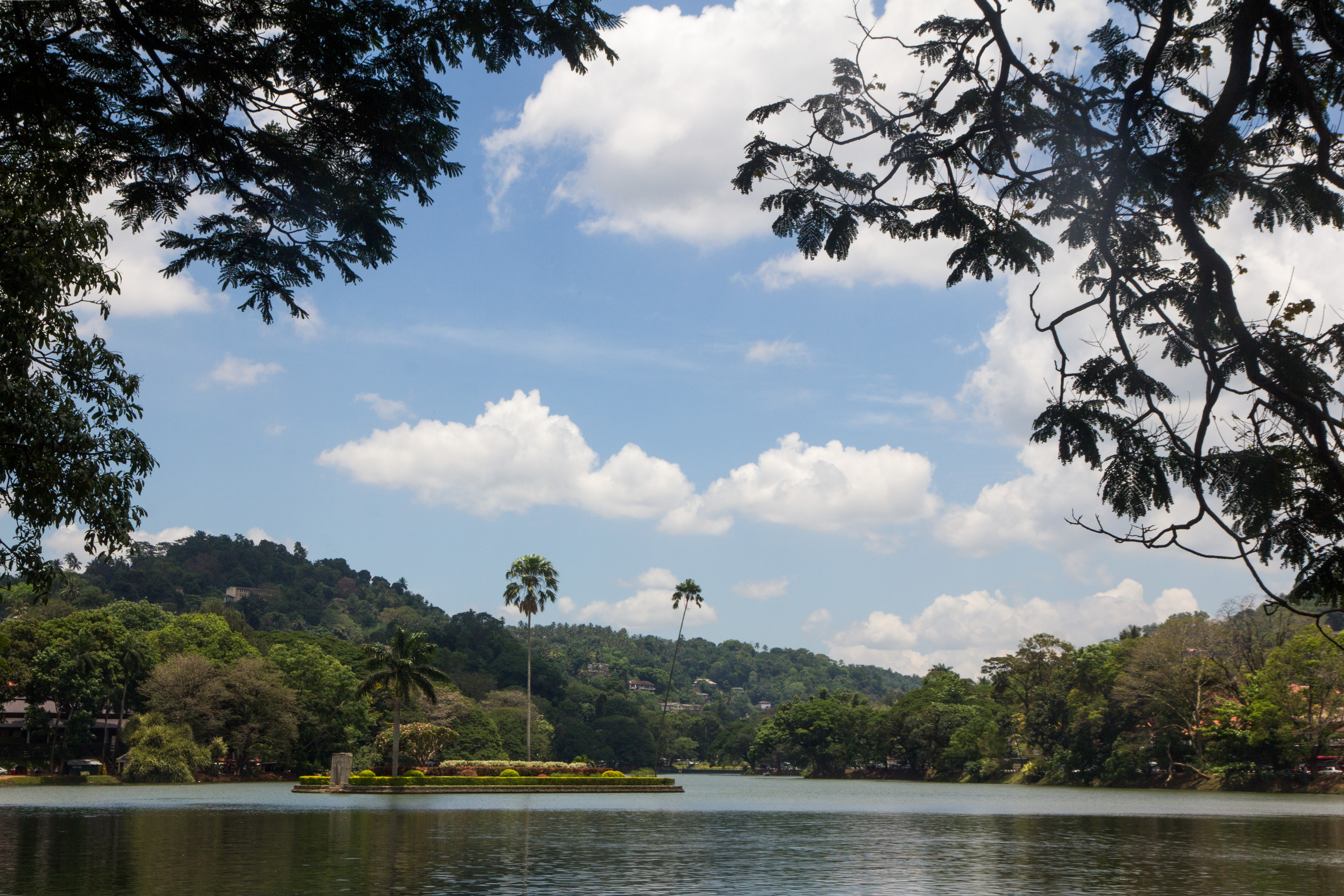
Panoramic view of the Kandy lake

=== Topography ===
Kandy is located in the mountainous and thickly forested interior of the island. The city is located in between multiple mountain ranges including the Knuckles Mountain Range and the Hanthana Mountain Range, giving the city an elevation of 500 metres (1,600 ft) above sea level. Kandy Lake, a human-made lake lies in the middle of the city, adjacent to the Central Business District (CBD). Udawattakele forest reserve located east of the CBD, make it the only city in Sri Lanka with a forest reserve located adjacent to the CBD.

=== Climate ===
In Köppen-Geiger climate classification system, its climate is tropical rainforest (Af). With Kandy located in the centre of the island and in a high elevation, the city has a relatively wetter and cooler temperatures than that of the tropical climate of the rest of the country, especially the coastal regions. Nuwara Eliya is south to it and has a cooler climate due to its higher elevation. Nevertheless, Kandy's climate is still tropical as mean temperatures year round are above 18 °C on average. The city does experience a drier period from January to April. From May through to July and October to December the region experiences its monsoon season, during this time the weather is rough and unstable. From March through the middle of May is the intermonsoonal period, during this time there is light rain and strong humidity. The humidity is generally between 70% and 79%.

Climate data for Kandy
Month	Jan	Feb	Mar	Apr	May	Jun	Jul	Aug	Sep	Oct	Nov	Dec	Year
Mean daily maximum °C (°F)	27 (81)	28 (82)	30 (86)	30 (86)	29 (84)	28 (82)	27 (81)	28 (82)	28 (82)	28 (82)	27 (81)	27 (81)	28 (83)
Daily mean °C (°F)	23.1 (73.6)	24.1 (75.4)	25.4 (77.7)	25.9 (78.6)	25.6 (78.1)	24.8 (76.6)	24.3 (75.7)	24.4 (75.9)	24.3 (75.7)	24.3 (75.7)	24 (75)	23.7 (74.7)	24.5 (76.1)
Mean daily minimum °C (°F)	18 (64)	18 (64)	18 (64)	20 (68)	20 (68)	20 (68)	20 (68)	19 (66)	19 (66)	19 (66)	19 (66)	18 (64)	19 (66)
Average precipitation mm (inches)	79 (3.1)	74 (2.9)	71 (2.8)	188 (7.4)	144 (5.7)	132 (5.2)	128 (5.0)	113 (4.4)	155 (6.1)	264 (10.4)	296 (11.7)	196 (7.7)	1,840 (72.4)
Average rainy days	6	5	8	14	11	15	14	13	13	17	16	14	146
Mean daily sunshine hours	7	8	8	7	6	6	6	6	6	6	6	6	7
Source 1: Weather2Travel for highs, lows and sunshine, Climate-Data.org for daily mean temperatures (altitude: 518 m)
Source 2: World Climate Guide, HolidayCheck.com, World Climate

== Cityscape ==
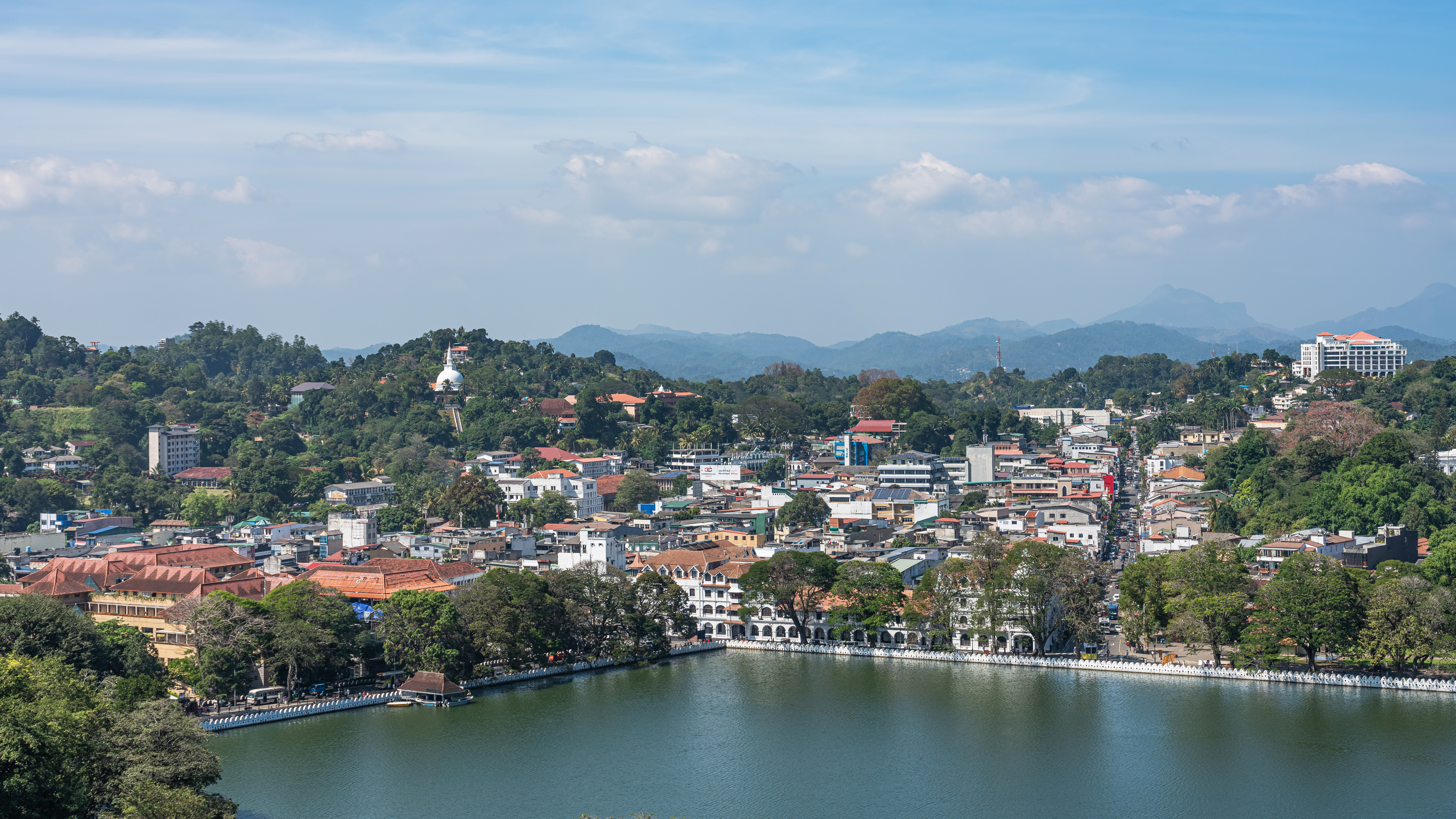
View from the Arthur's seat

The city of Kandy lies at an elevation of 465 metres (1,526 ft) above sea level. Its plan developed around two open spaces: an elongated square, at the end of which are the administration buildings of the old capital, and an artificial lake that is quadrangular in form. A public garden adds to the openness of the city's spatial organisation.

Kandy has now grown out to encompass Peradeniya, home to the University of Peradeniya and the Botanical Gardens, Katugastota to the north, and east to Kundasale, Tennekumbura and Gurudeniya.

=== Neighbourhoods ===
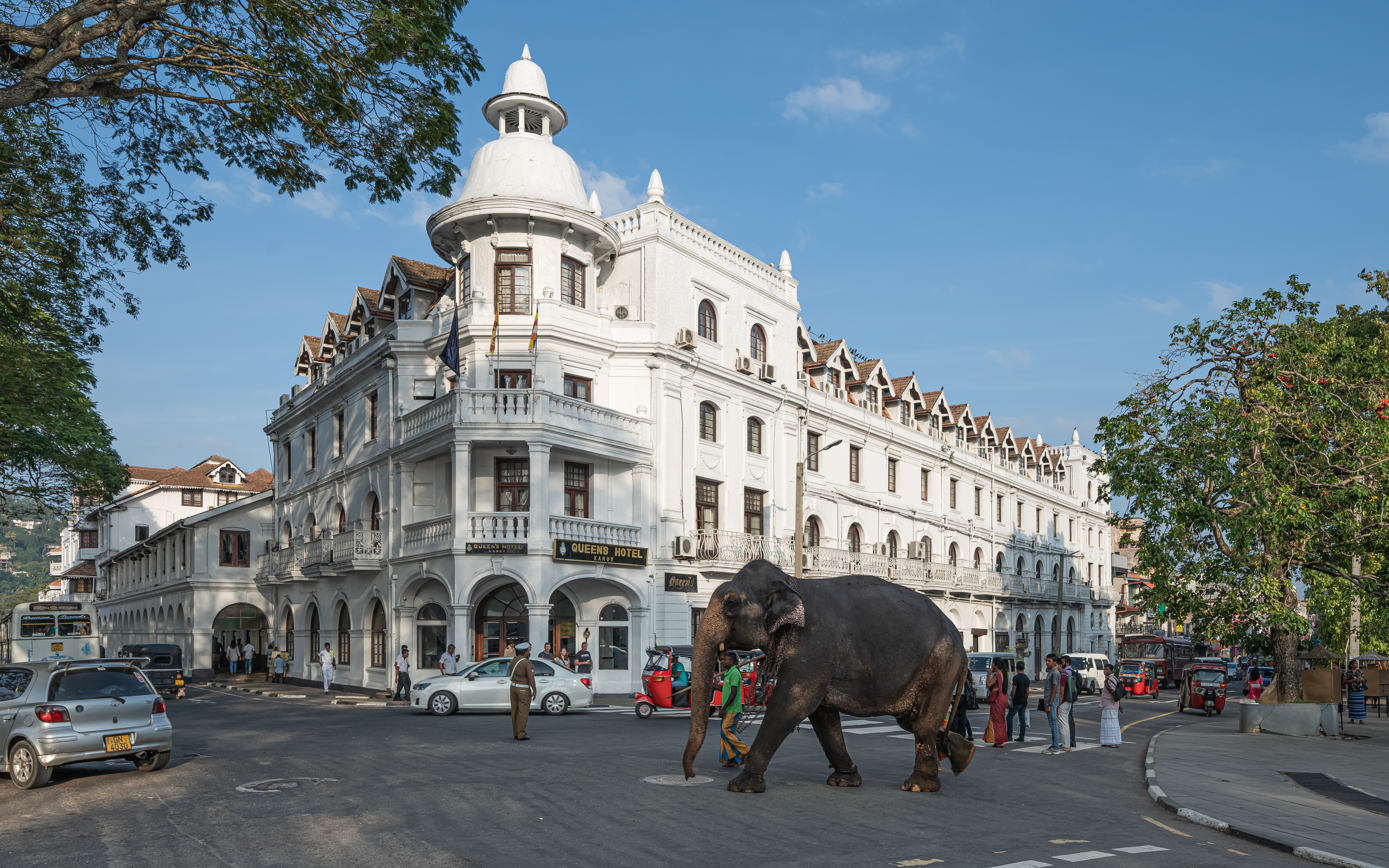
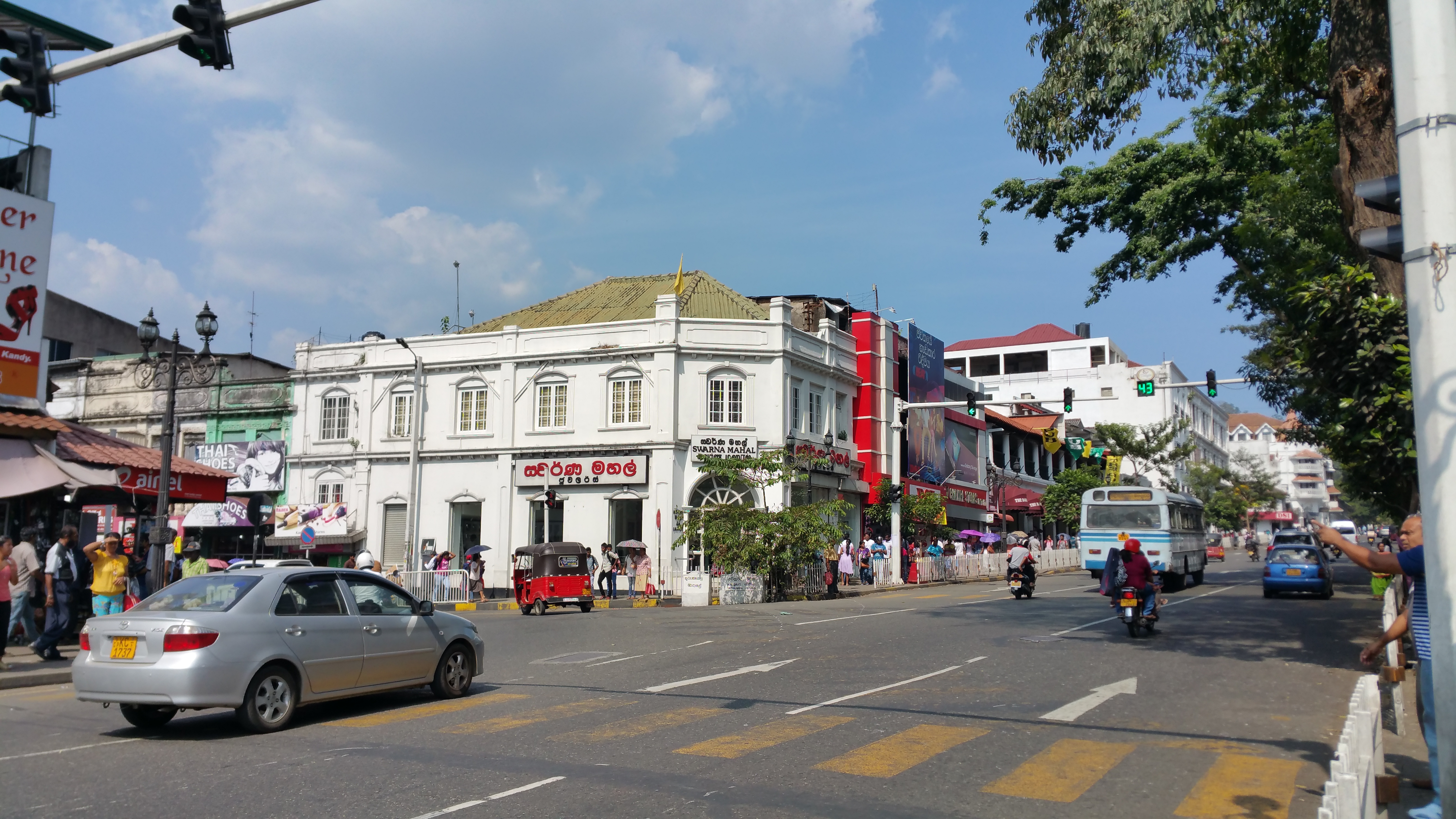
Downtown Kandy
- Akurana
- Ampitiya
- Ampitiya North
- Ampitiya South
- Anniwatta
- Aruppola East
- Asgiriya
- Bahirawakanda
- Bogambara
- Bogodawatta
- Bowala
- Buwelikada
- Dangolla
- Deiyannewela
- Etamoragodawatta Colony
- Gannoruwa West
- Gelioya
- Gampola
- Hinagama
- Katugastota
- Katukele
- Kosgaspitiya
- Kotugodella
- Lewella
- Madawala
- Mahaiyawa
- Malwatta
- Mapanawatura
- Mavilmada
- Menikkumbura
- Mulgampola
- Navayalatenna
- Nittawela
- Nuwara Dodanwala
- Peradeniya
- Polgolla
- Siyabalapitiya
- Siyambalagastenna
- Suduhumpola East
- Suduhumpola West
- Talwatta
- Tennekumbura
- Udamadapola
- Udathalawinna
- Watapuluwa
- Wattarantenna
- Wewelpitiya
- Yatiwawala
- Wattegama

=== Wards ===
Kandy has 24 wards:

== Government ==
Kandy Municipal Council මහනුවර මහ නගර සභා

Type
- Type: Local authority
- Houses: Unicameral
- Term limits: Four years

History
- Founded: 1865

Leadership
- Mayor of Kandy: Chandrasiri Wijenayake, NPP since 3 June 2025
- Municipal Commissioner: Chandana Tennakoon
- Seats: 46

Elections
- Voting system: open list proportional representation system
- Last election: 2025 Sri Lankan local elections

Website
- kandy.mc.gov.lk

Kandy is a charter city, with a Mayor Council form of government. The Mayor of Kandy and the councillors are elected through local government elections held once in five years. The Head of administration is the Municipal Commissioner, who handles the day-to-day operations of the 16 departments that it is made up of.

The Kandy Municipal Council governs the City of Kandy, it was established under the Municipalities Ordinance of 1865. The inaugural meeting had been held on 20 March 1866. The Kandy Town Hall was established in the present premises known as the Dunuwille Walawwe in 1870.

The Government Agent of the Central Province had presided over the council until 1939 when the Mayor was elected. The first elected mayor was Sir Cuda Ratwatte. With further amendments to the ordinance in 1978, the Mayor became the Executive Head whilst the Commissioner was the Administrative head.

Following the 2025 local government election, the Kandy Municipal Council has 46 members. The National People's Power emerged as the largest party with 24 seats, followed by the Samagi Jana Balawegaya with 11 seats and the United National Party with 6 seats. The Council meets once a month to review the progress and decide on the implementation of its projects. Five standing committees of the council, namely Finance, Law, Works, Sports and Welfare Services (Pre-Schools, Library), also meet monthly to evaluate and recommend to Council relative matters for approval.

== Demographics ==
Kandy is a Sinhalese majority city; there are sizeable communities belonging to other ethnic groups, such as Moors and Tamils. The city remains an important religious centre of the Sinhalese and a place of pilgrimage for Buddhists, namely those belonging to the Theravada school. The Catholic Church has a diocese headquartered in the city.

=== Census of population (2012) ===
Ethnicity in Kandy (2012)
Population	Percent
Sinhalese	74.55%
Sri Lankan Moors	10.90%
Sri Lankan Tamils	9.59%
Indian Tamils	3.53%
Others	1.43%

Ethnicity	Population	% Of Total
Sinhalese	118,209	74.55
Sri Lankan Moors	17,282	10.90
Sri Lankan Tamils	15,203	9.59
Indian Tamils	5,601	3.53
Other (including Burgher, Malay)	2,266	1.43
Total	158,561	100

Source:statistics.gov.lk

Religion in Kandy Four Gravets and Gangawata Korale DS Division (2012)
1. Buddhist (71.0%)
2. Hindu (10.2%)
3. Muslim (12.0%)
4. Roman Catholic (4.77%)
5. Other Christian (2.10%)
6. Other (0.04%)

== Economy ==
Kandy contributes greatly to the country's economy, generating the highest income after Colombo and Gampaha. Many major corporations have large branch offices in Kandy and many industries including textiles, Sri Lankan gemstones, furniture, information technology, and jewellery are found there. Many agriculture research centres are located throughout the city.

== Health care ==
Kandy has significant number of principal healthcare centres in Sri Lanka and serves the Central Province as well as neighbouring districts. The city has a mix of government hospitals, teaching institutions, specialist centres and private healthcare providers.

=== Government sector ===
The largest state medical institution in the city is the National Hospital Kandy, one of the major tertiary-care hospitals in Sri Lanka. It provides specialist services and functions as a teaching hospital for medical training.

Other important public healthcare institutions in and around Kandy include the Teaching Hospital, Peradeniya, the Dental Hospital Peradeniya, and the Sirimavo Bandaranayake Specialized Children's Hospital. These institutions provide secondary and tertiary care, specialist treatment, and academic training.

Primary healthcare services in the Kandy area are also supported by divisional hospitals, community medical facilities and public health units administered by the Ministry of Health.

=== Private sector ===
Kandy also has an established private healthcare sector consisting of private hospitals, specialist clinics, dental centres, laboratories and diagnostic institutions. These facilities complement the public healthcare system by providing outpatient care, elective procedures and specialist consultations.

Among private healthcare providers in the city are institutions such as Asiri Hospital, Kandy, Suwasewana Hospital, Kandy, Cayo Dental Hospital and other independently operated medical and dental practices.

== Infrastructure ==
=== Transportation ===
Kandy has a public transport system based primarily on buses. The bus service is operated both by private companies and the government's own Sri Lanka Transport Board (SLTB). The Kandy Multimodal Transport Terminal (KMTT) after constructed will integrate a major bus terminal to the Kandy railway station. KMTT will handle about 2,000 bus departures, up to 3,000 further through-services, and about 320,000 passenger movements on a daily basis. EoIs from consultants for the Design, Construction Supervision and Contract Administration of the project were called in 2016 funded by the Government of the Republic of Korea and the development of the Greater Kandy Urban Plan by the UDA of Sri Lanka under the assistance of the Japan International Cooperation Agency (JICA).

==== Air ====
A domestic airport serving Kandy has been proposed for locations including Kundasale and later Maberiyatenna, Digana. In 2018, the Cabinet approved a feasibility study for a domestic airport intended to improve regional air connectivity. As of 2026, the project remains at the proposal stage.

==== Roads ====
A-Grade highways

- A1 highway (Kandy road) connects Colombo with Kandy.
- A9 highway connects Jaffna with Kandy.
- A26 highway connects Padiyathalawa with Kandy via Mahiyangana.
- A10 highway connects Puttalam with Kandy via Kurunegala and Katugastota.
- A5 highway connects Chenkalady with Kandy via Padiyathalawa Badulla Nuwara Eliya and Peradeniya.

High-speed expressways

- The proposed Colombo–Kandy expressway is being developed through sections of the Central Expressway (E04) and related link roads. As of 2026, several sections are operational or under construction, while key segments connecting the Kandy region, including the Rambukkana–Galagedara section, remain under development.

==== Rail ====
- Matale Line of the Sri Lanka Railways connects Kandy by way of Peradeniya and Matale. It connects to the Main Line that links Colombo and BadullaRail transport in Kandy has periodically been affected by severe weather events, including flooding and landslides. Following major floods in late 2025, sections of the railway network serving Kandy and the Up-Country line experienced temporary suspensions, infrastructure damage and service delays while repairs were carried out.

=== Architecture ===
Kandy World Heritage Site marker

==== Temple of the Tooth ====
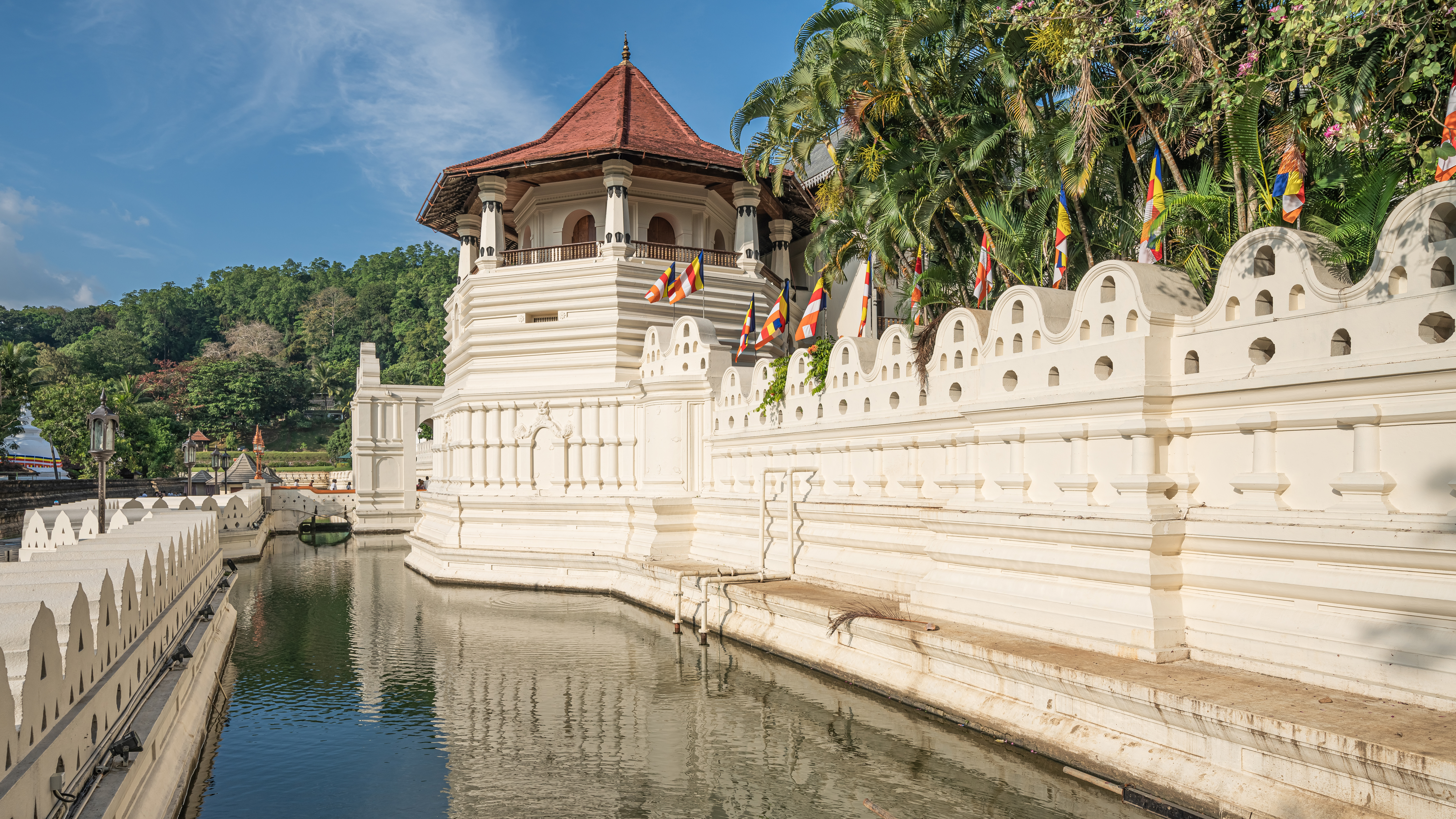
Temple of the Tooth Relic, Kandy.

On the north shore of the lake, which is enclosed by a parapet of white stone dating to the beginning of the 19th century, are the city's official religious monuments, including the Royal Palace and the Temple of the Tooth, known as the Sri Dalada Maligawa (daḷadā māligāva). Reconstructed in the 18th century, the Sri Dalada Maligawa is built on a base of granite that was inspired by the temples of Sri Lanka's former capital city, Anuradhapura. An array of materials (limestone, marble, sculpted wood, ivory, etc.) contribute to the richness of this temple. Throughout this small holy city, a number of recent Buddhist monasteries can be found.

The monumental ensemble of Kandy is an example of construction that associates the Royal Palace and the Temple of the Tooth (Palace of the tooth relic) is the place that houses the relic of the tooth of the Buddha. Originally part of the Royal Palace complex of the Kandyan Kingdom, it is one of the holiest places of worship and pilgrimage for Buddhists around the world. It was the last of a series of temples built in the places where the relic, the actual palladium of the Sinhalese monarchy, was brought following the various relocations of the capital city.

The Palace of the Tooth relic, the palace complex and the holy city of Kandy are associated with the history of the dissemination of Buddhism. The temple is the product of the last peregrination of the relic of the tooth of Buddha and the testimony of a religion which continues to be practiced today.

The International Buddhist Museum nearby houses objects contributed by India, Gandhara, Bhutan, Nepal, Korea, Thailand, etc. A 16-foot statue of Gautama Buddha, a replica of the Sarnath Buddha is installed in front of the museum, gifted by the Government of India.

==== Royal Palace ====
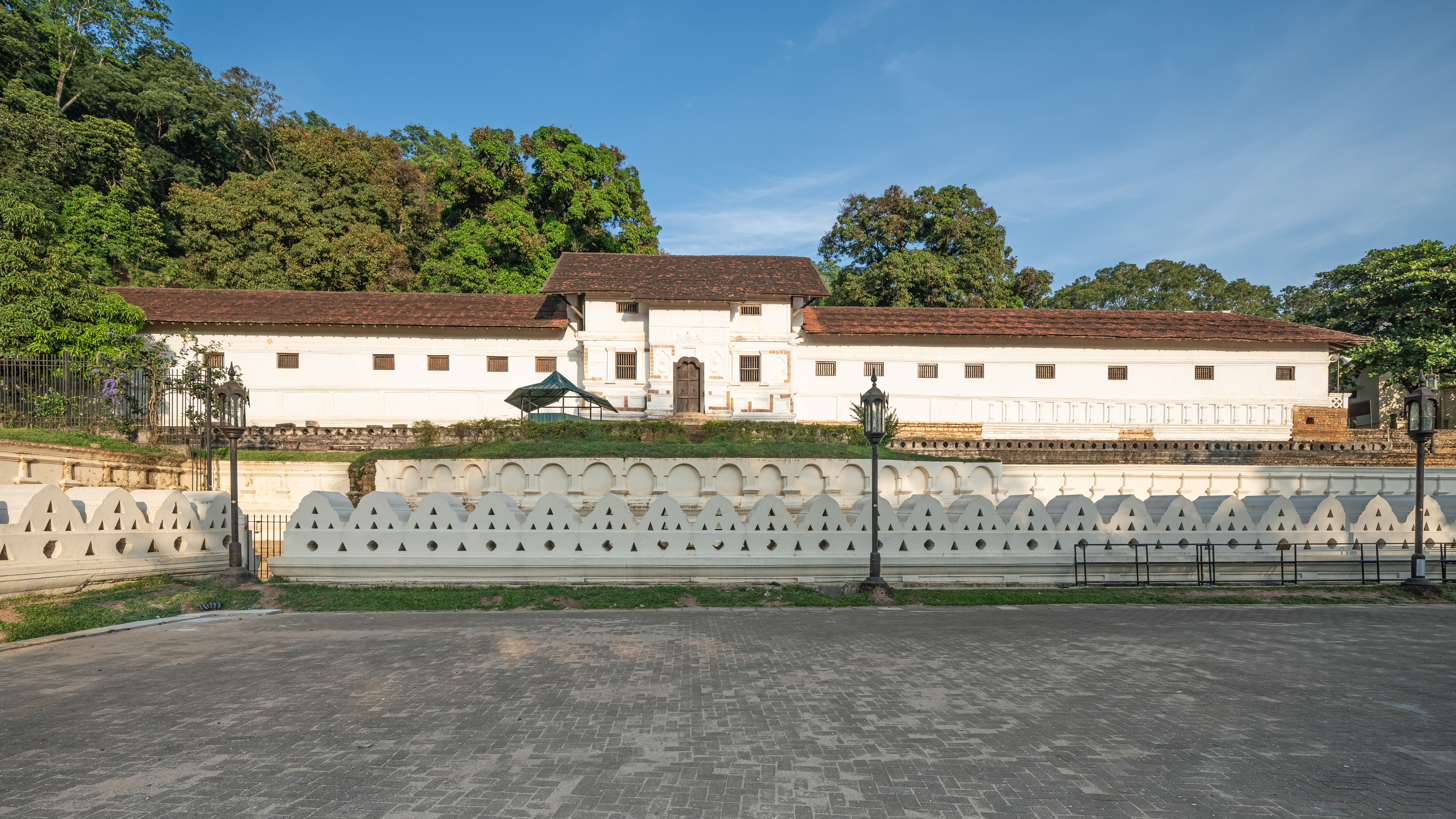
The Royal Palace of Kandy

The Royal Palace of Kandy is the last Royal Palace built in the island. Although only part of the original palace complex remains. The Temple of the Tooth was part of this complex, due to the ancient tradition that stated that the monarch is the protector of the relic though which the ruler of the land. It today houses the National Museum Kandy which holds an extensive collection of artefacts from both the Kandy Kingdom and the British colonial rule.

==== Lankatilaka Temple ====
The Lankatilaka Temple is considered to be one of the best-preserved examples of traditional Sinhalese temple architecture. Built on a rock, the temple is reached by a long series of rock-cut steps. An arched passage of the image house leads through a Mandapa (hall) into the inner sanctum which is decorated with floral designs. The two side walls and the ceiling are decorated with paintings. In the inner sanctum is a large seated image of the Buddha.

==== Gadaladeniya Temple ====
The Gadaladeniya Temple's design is of South Indian origin with a Devale attached to it, similar in character to the Natha Devale and the Gedige of Adahana Maluwa. The main shrine room has a seated Buddha statue and the remains of some paintings of the Gampola period.

Among other important temples around Kandy are Dodanwala Devalaya (shrine), Embekka Devalaya (shrine), Galmaduwa Vihara temple, Handagala Vihara temple, Medawala Vihara and Nalanda Gedige.

=== Parks and gardens ===
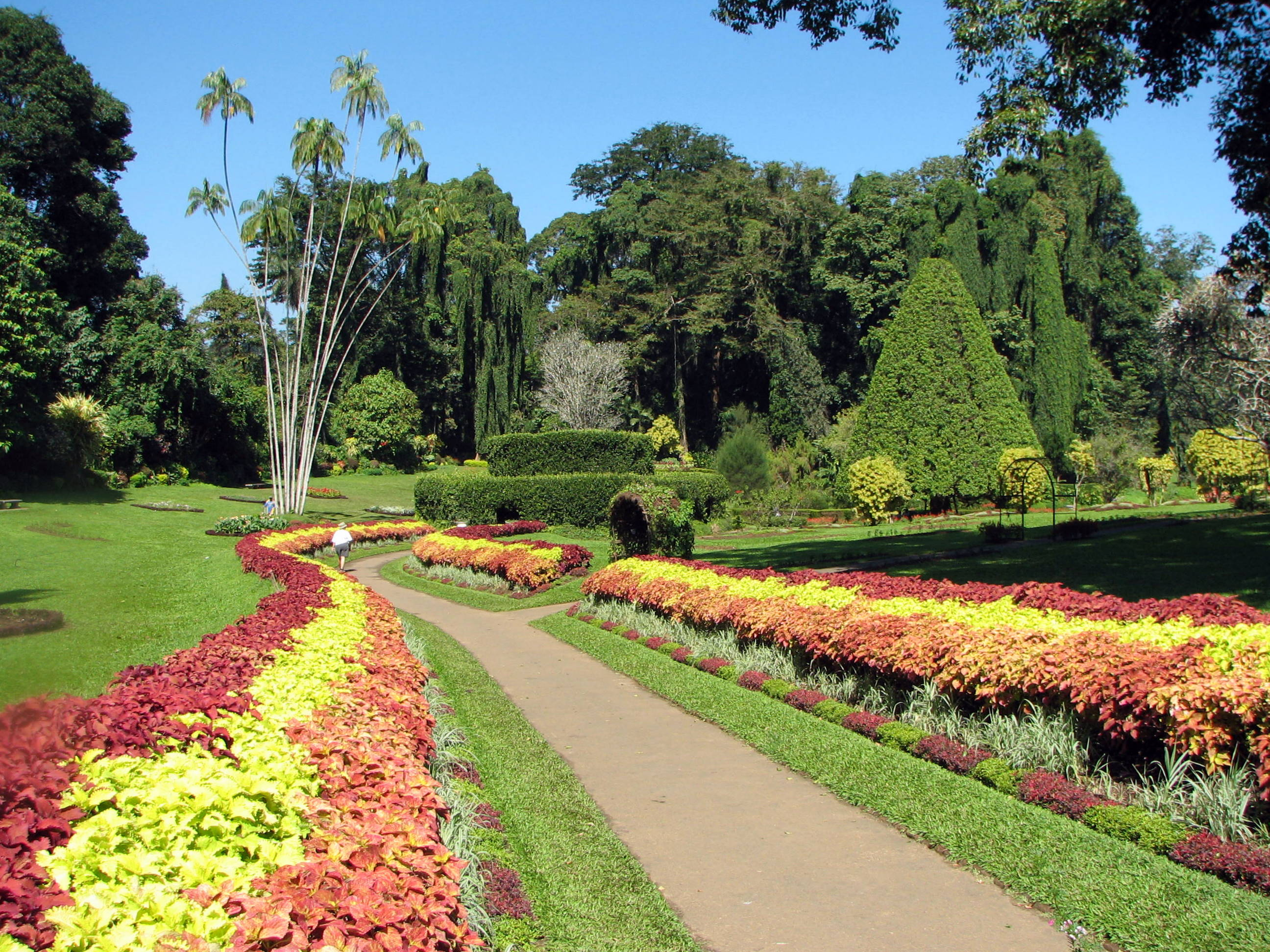
Peradeniya Botanic garden

The Royal Botanic Gardens, Peradeniya is situated about 5 km to the west of the city centre at Peradeniya and is visited by 2 million people per year. It is the largest botanical garden on the island extending to 147 acres (59 ha) and containing over 4000 species of plants. Knuckles Mountain Range in Kandy is a world heritage site of UNESCO. Alagalla Mountain Range also named in English as Potato Range both famous for trekking in Sri Lanka. The Udawatta Kele (Udawatta Forest) is a protected sanctuary situated in the heart of the city, just north of the Temple of the Tooth. Known as "Uda Wasala Watta" in Sinhala meaning, "the garden situated above the royal palace", it was designated as a forest reserve in 1856, and it became a sanctuary in 1938.

The Royal Palace Park, known as Wales Park is a small park that overlooks Kandy Lake and most of the city. In the park is a Japanese field gun which was captured by the British 14th Army in Burma during World War II and presented to the city of Kandy by Lord Mountbatten, Supreme Allied Commander South East Asia Theatre.

== Education ==
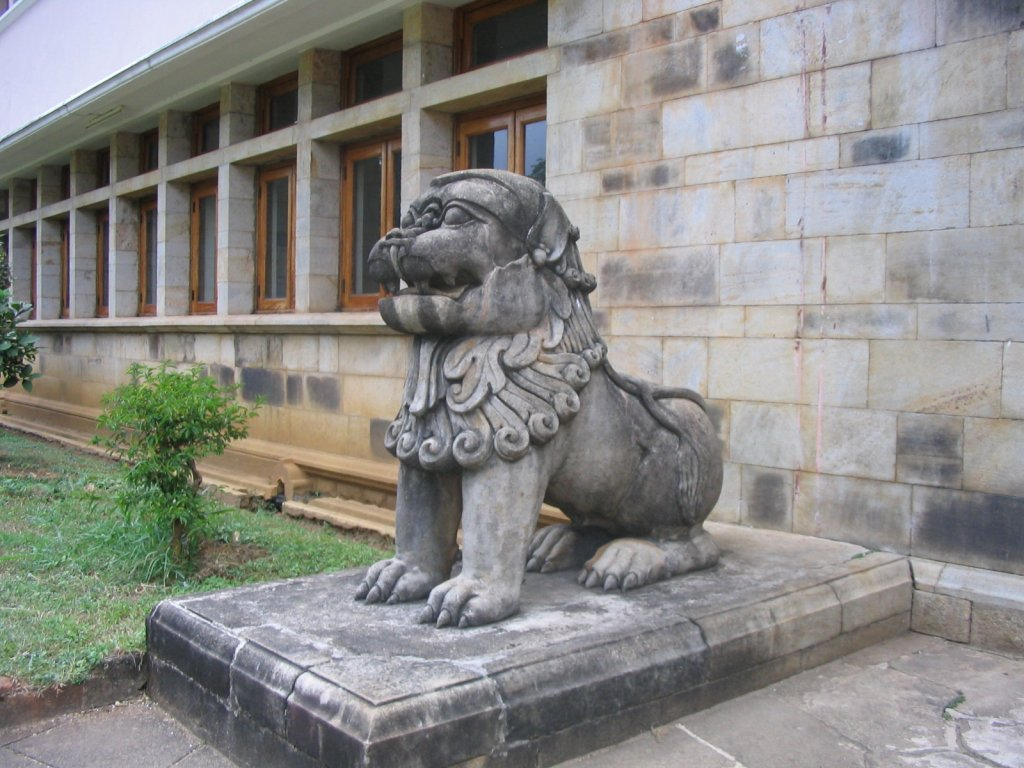
A traditional lion statue in front of the senate building of the university

=== Primary and secondary education ===
Kandy is home to some of the island's oldest and leading schools.

- Dharmaraja College
- Girls' High School, Kandy
- Good Shepherd Convent, Kandy
- Gothami Girls College
- Hemamali Girls College
- Hillwood College
- Kingswood College
- Mahamaya Girls' College, Kandy
- Pushpadana Girls' College, Kandy
- Ranabima Royal College
- St. Anthony's College, Kandy
- St. Anthony's Girls College
- St. Benedict's College, Kandy
- St. Sylvester's College
- Sarasavi Uyana College
- Seethadevi Girls' College
- Sri Chandananda Buddhist College
- Sri Rahula College
- Swarnamali Girls College
- Trinity College Kandy
- Vidyartha College
- Viharamahadevi Girls College
- Wariyapola Sri Sumangala College

=== Tertiary education ===
The country's second-oldest university, University of Peradeniya is situated in Peradeniya, while the Open University of Sri Lanka, the Sri Lanka Institute of Information Technology, the National Institute of Business Management and the College of Technology have centres in the city. Most of the private-sector higher educational institutions also have their branches in Kandy.

The Geology Department at the University of Peradeniya is the only earth science department in Sri Lanka.

== Culture ==
=== Leisure and entertainment ===
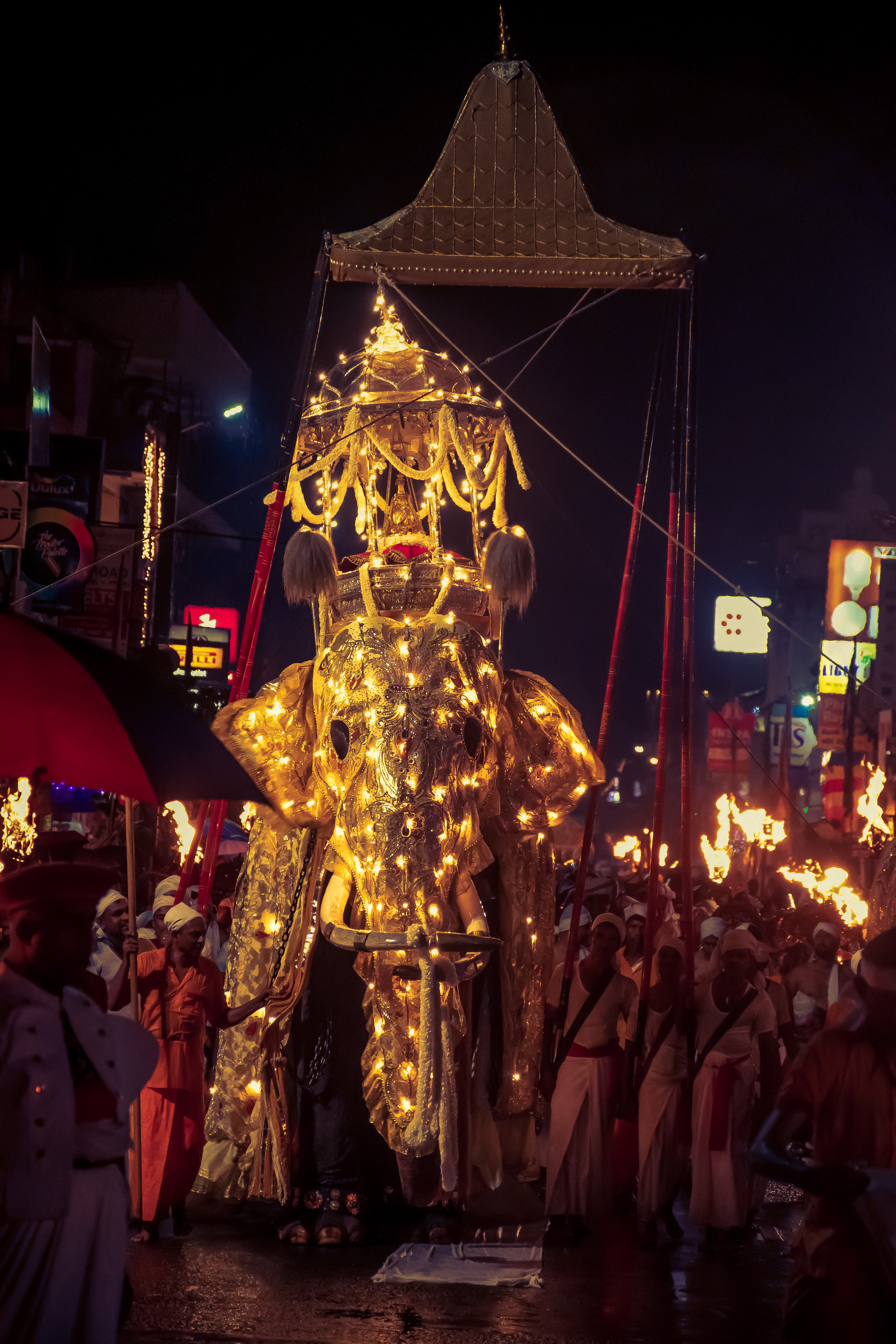
Esala Perahera is the prominent cultural event of the city

Kandyans do many things for leisure and entertainment in the city. Kandy is popular due to the annual procession known as the Esala Perahera, in which one of the inner caskets used for covering the tooth relic of Buddha is taken in a grand procession through the streets of the city. This casket is taken on a royal tusker. The procession includes traditional dancers and drummers, flag bearers of the provinces of the old Kandyan kingdom, the Nilames (lay custodians of temples ) wearing their traditional dresses, torch-bearers, and also the grandly attired elephant. This ceremony which is annually held in the months of July or August attracts large crowds from all parts of the country and also many foreign tourists.

Kandy City Centre is commercial and shopping complex open in 2005 at Dalada Veediya. and is the most modern commercial complex in Kandy. The complex is studded with ultra-modern features, also incorporating the traditional architecture of Kandy during the medieval period of Sri Lanka. The city centre is host to several leading banks, a fully equipped supermarket, modern restaurants, an entertainment zone including a 3-cinema complex, a well-designed state-of-the-art food court, Sri Lanka's leading bookshop, flora, and an Ayurveda site. There is a five-level car park outside managed separately by the Kandy Municipal Council and is the largest car park in Kandy.

The city has a significant hospitality sector, with hotels, restaurants, cafés and lakefront venues contributing to tourism and evening leisure activity.

=== Literature, film and television ===
Much of the 1984 film Indiana Jones and the Temple of Doom was shot in Kandy.

=== Sport ===
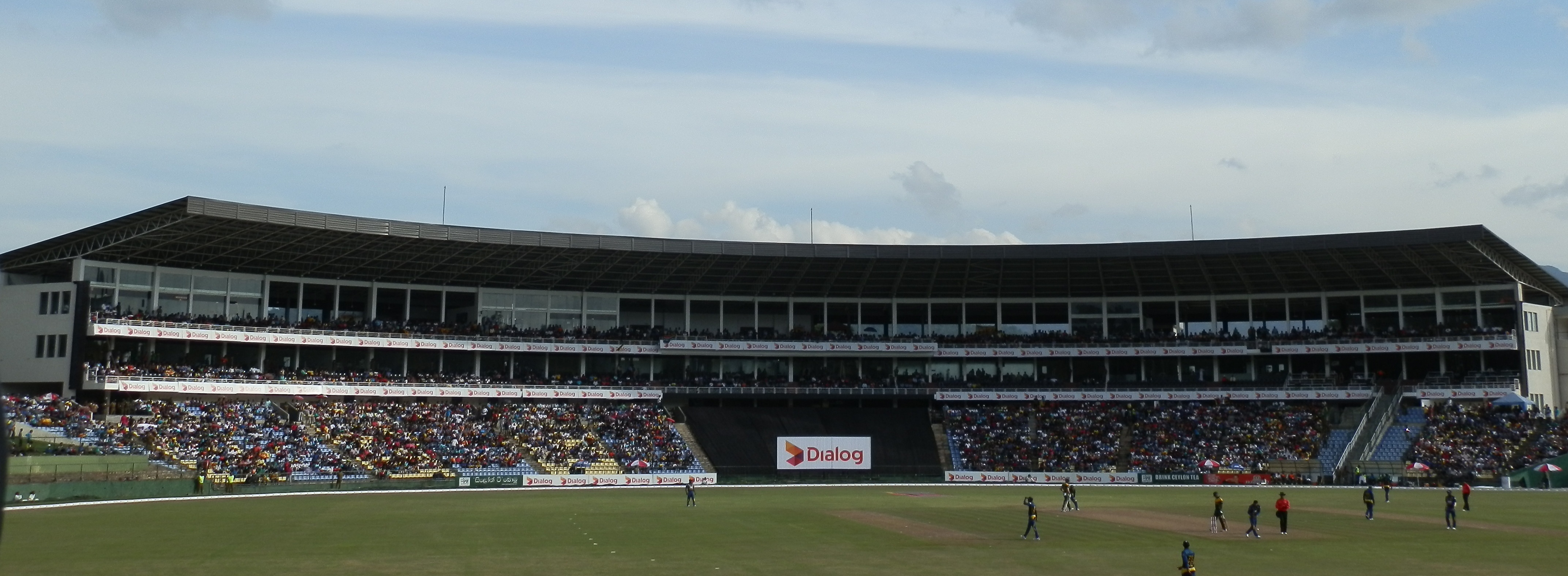
Pallekele International Cricket Stadium

Kandy has produced national-level competitors in a wide range of sports, including cricket, rugby union, association football, swimming, field hockey, athletics, table tennis, boxing, basketball, golf, and even baseball, which has only been introduced into Kandy recently. Kandy has produced national captains of cricket and rugby and athletes that play at the highest level of all sports.

Unlike the rest of the country rugby is the most popular sport in the region. This is because of the local rugby union club, Kandy Sports Club being the reigning Club Rugby Champions in the national league for almost a decade, as well as the fondness and support the local schools treat the sport with. The Sri Lanka Sevens tournament is an annual international rugby union event held at the local Bogambara Stadium, attracting nations from all over the world.

Cricket is widely played in Kandy with the city having three first-class teams in the Premier Trophy, Saracens, Kandy Cricket Club and Kandy Youth Cricket Club, as well as being the main city for the Lanka Premier League side Kandy Falcons. Kandy is host to the Sri Lanka national cricket team with two grounds hosting Test matches, Asgiriya International Stadium (dating from 1915) and the newer Pallekele International Cricket Stadium (built in time for the 2011 Cricket World Cup). Both stadiums have held World Cup matches. Other cricket venues are Katugastota Oval (St. Anthony's College ground), Lake View ground at Dharmaraja College, and Police ground Kandy.

Sports like field hockey, volleyball (the national sport of Sri Lanka), and association football however have not taken off in Kandy as much as other sports, due to the lack of proper playing fields, funding, and support. Cue games like billiards and snooker have hardly anyone playing. However, basketball, table tennis, badminton, and swimming are common due to the high participation of students and schools.

== Twin towns and sister cities ==
The City of Kandy has a sister city relationship with:

Country	City	Province	Year
Thailand	Ayudhya	Ayutthaya	2013
China	Chengdu	Sichuan	2015

== See also ==
- Esala Perahera
- Kingdom of Kandy
- World Heritage Sites of Sri Lanka
