= Sri Maha Bodhi Viharaya =

Theravada Buddhist temple in Kandy, Sri Lanka

Sri Maha Bodhi Vihara
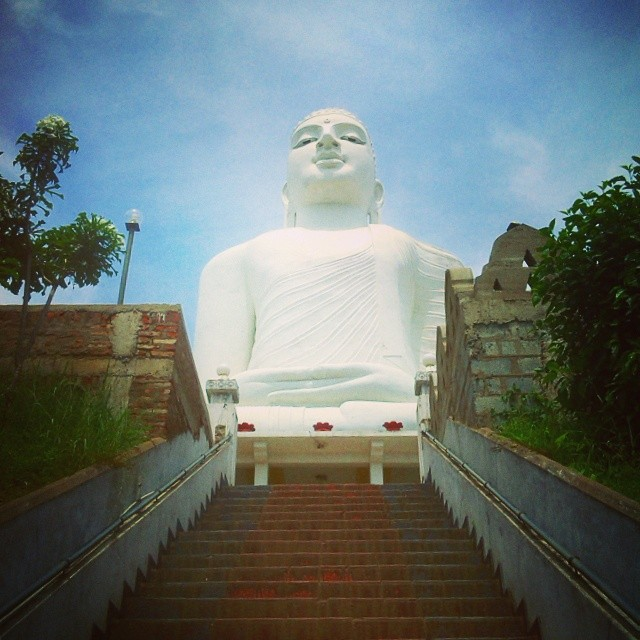

Religion
- Affiliation: Buddhism
- Province: Central Province
- Year consecrated: 1972

Location
- Location: Kandy
- Country: Sri Lanka
- Interactive map of Sri Maha Bodhi Vihara
- Coordinates: 7°17′29.6″N 80°37′45.0″E

Architecture
- Type: Buddha Statue
- Height (max): 26.83m

Sri Maha Bodhi Viharaya is a Theravada Buddhist temple in Kandy, Sri Lanka. It is located in Bahirawakanda, approximately 2 km (1.2 mi) from the city centre. The temple is known for its giant Buddha statue. The statue of Buddha is depicted in the position of the Dhyana Mudra, the posture of meditation associated with his first Enlightenment, and can be seen from almost everywhere in Kandy. It stands at 26.83 m (88.0 ft) high and is one of the tallest Buddha statues in Sri Lanka.

The temple is built on land donated by the Minister of Lands, Hector Kobbekaduwa, to Ven. Ampitiye Dammarama Thero, a monk from the Amarapura Nikaya in the early 1970s. Initially Dammarama lived in a makeshift dwelling whilst soliciting funds for the construction of the temple. The temple was opposed by the senior monks of the Sri Dalada Maligawa (Temple of the Sacred Tooth Relic), claiming it would overshadow the centre of the Siyam Nikaya. In the 1980s a chief monk of the Amarapura Nikaya, Hinatiyana Dhammaloka, successfully petitioned President Ranasinghe Premadasa to intervene and legally grant the land to Dammarama.

In the late 1980s Dammarama began to build a statue of Buddha, with construction of the statue completed in 1992. It was officially opened on 1 January 1993 by President Ranasinghe Premadasa. It is now a popular tourist attraction.

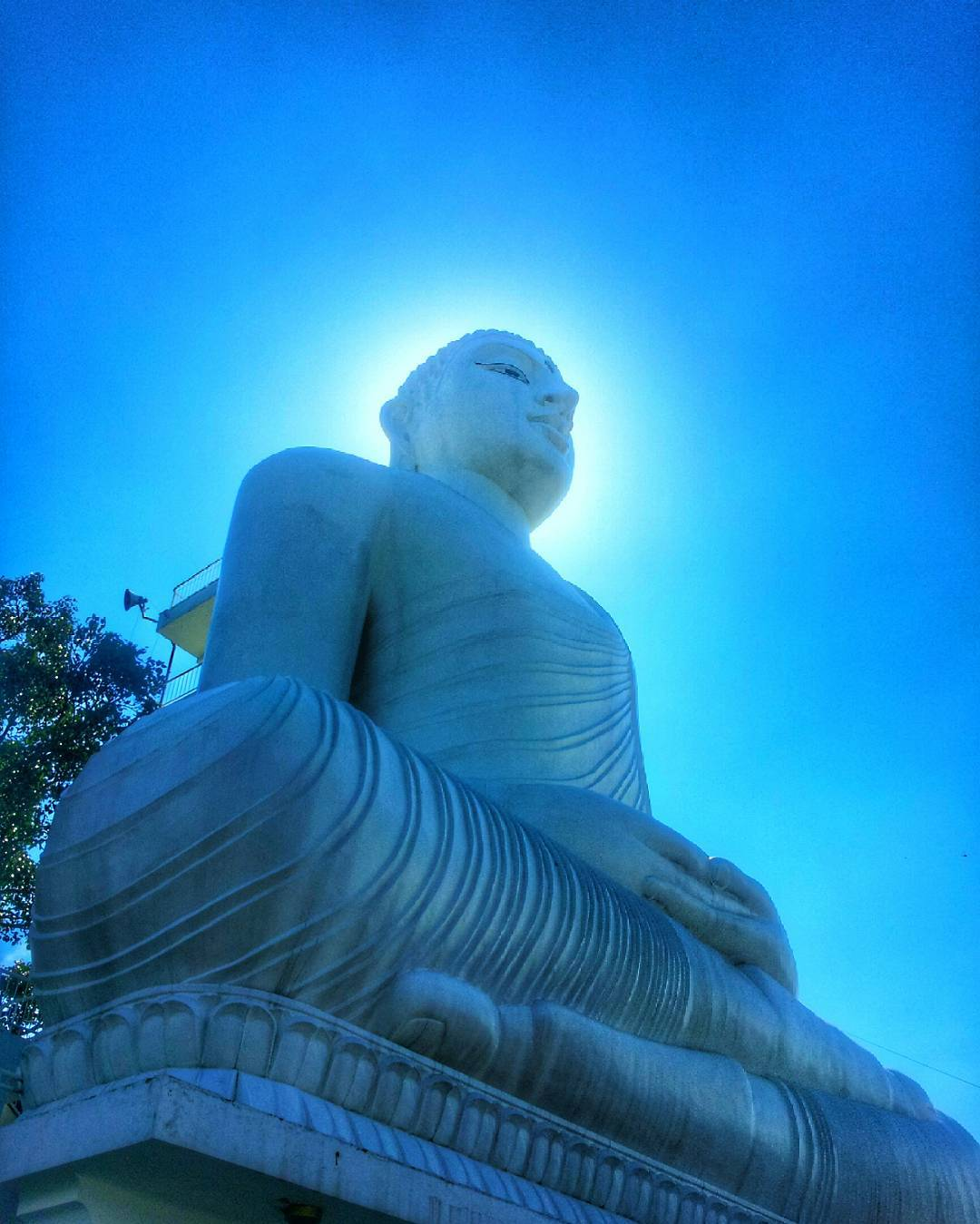
Buddha statue of Sri Maha Bodhi Viharaya

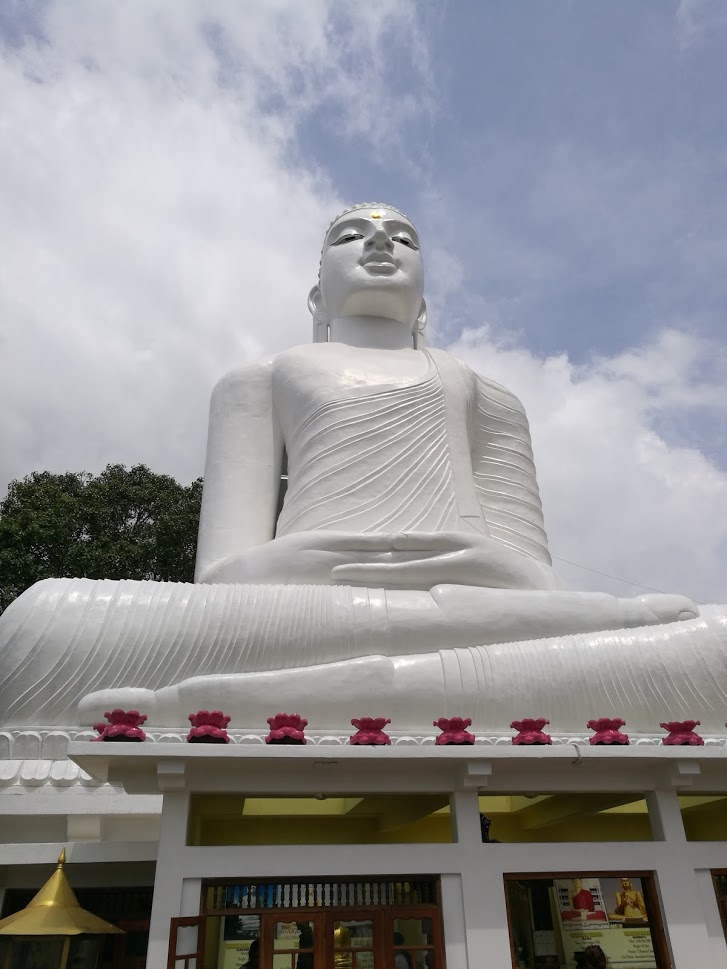
Buddha statue in daytime
