= Suduhumpola =

- Village
- Location of Suduhumpola in Sri Lanka
- Coordinates: 7°16′41″N 80°37′36″E
- Country: Sri Lanka
- Province: Central Province
- District: Kandy District
- Divisional secretariat: Kandy Four Gravets and Gangawata Korale
- Elevation: 500 m (1,600 ft)
- Time zone: UTC+5:30 (Sri Lanka Standard Time)
- Postal code: 20000
- Area code: 081

Suduhumpola is a village in Kandy District, Central Province, Sri Lanka. It lies 1.5 miles from Kandy on the foothills of the Hanthana Mountain Range, in Kandy Four Gravets and Gangawata Korale.

== History ==
Suduhumpola originates with the Suduhumpola Raja Maha Vihara, completed in 1777, according to Archibald Campbell Lawrie's A Gazetteer of the Central Province. Another tradition states it was completed in 1769 by Kirti Sri Rajasinha of Kandy. Tradition relates that when the king visited the temple, a white cloth was laid for him to step on, hence the name "Suduhumpola" meaning "where the white cloth was laid".

== Demographics ==
Historical population
| Year | Pop. | ±% |
|---|---|---|
| 1881 | 260 | — |
| 1891 | 220 | −15.4% |
| 1901 | 433 | +96.8% |
| 1911 | 431 | −0.5% |

== See also ==
- List of towns in Central Province, Sri Lanka
- Suduhumpola Raja Maha Vihara
