= National Hospital (Teaching), Kandy =

The National Hospital Kandy
- Ministry of Health, Sri Lanka

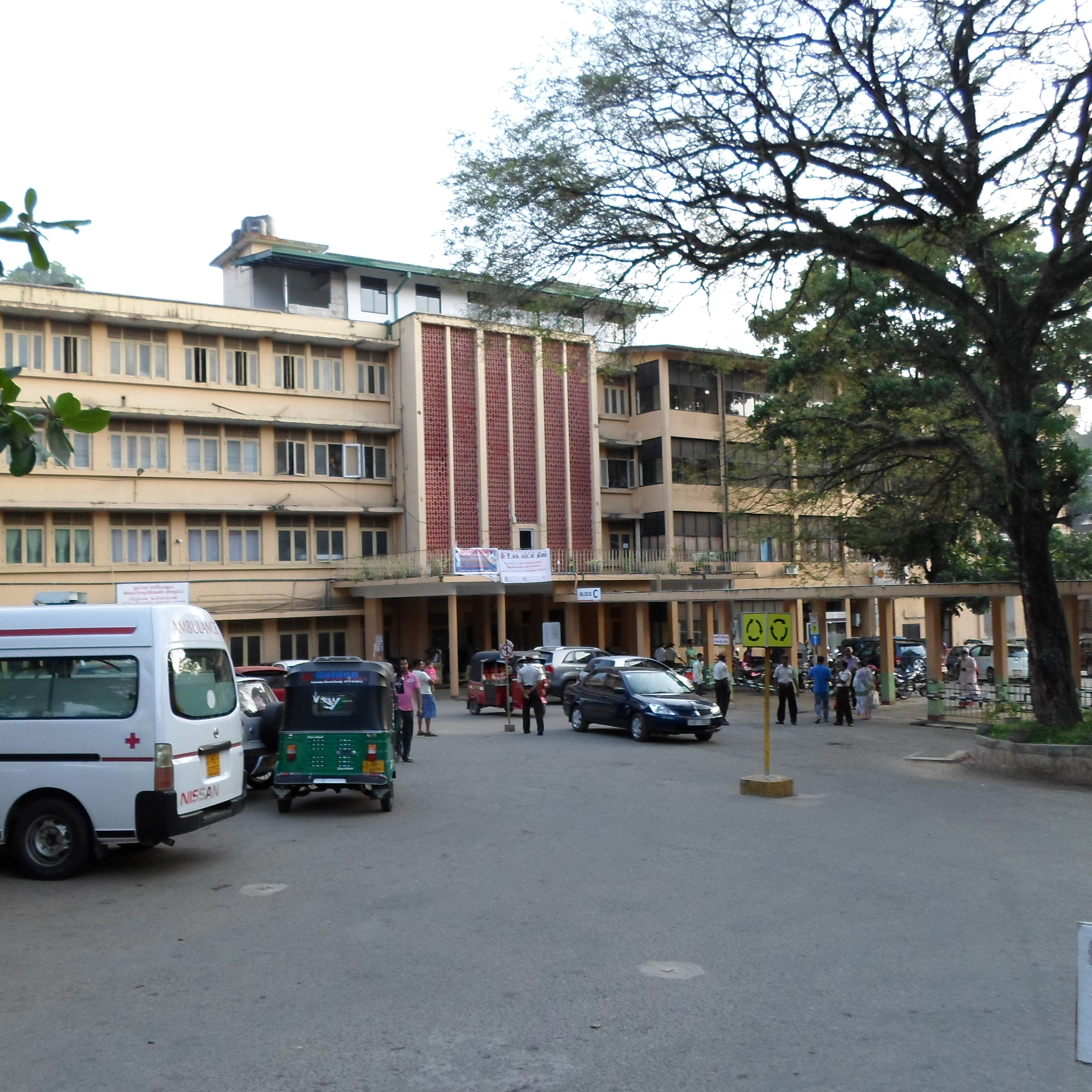

Geography
- Location: Kandy, Central Province, Sri Lanka
- Coordinates: 7°17′10.5″N 80°37′53.7″E

Organisation
- Care system: Public
- Type: Teaching
- Affiliated university: University of Peradeniya

Services
- Emergency department: Yes
- Beds: 2741 (2020)
- Speciality: National

History
- Former names: Teaching Hospital, Kandy
- Founded: 1889; 137 years ago

Links
- Website: nhkandy.org
- Lists: Hospitals in Sri Lanka

The National Hospital Kandy (NH Kandy) is the second largest Hospital in Sri Lanka with a bed strength of 2741 and is the major tertiary care unit in the Central Province. In 2019, Teaching Hospital Kandy was upgraded as the second National Hospital of Sri Lanka.

== History ==
The fall of the Kandyan Kingdom in 1815 led to the establishment of Western (English) rule. Dr. John Davy was an army surgeon and physician to Governor Robert Brownrigg from 1817 to 1819. Davy came to Kandy with the British Troops and lived next to Diyawadana Nilame's resident in Malabar Street.

A Military Hospital was built in a renovated existing building and was located at the site of the present “Kandyan Art Association”. Later it served both military and civilians especially for Cholera and Smallpox.

After 1821, Indian laborers came to Sri Lanka for coffee and later tea enterprises. Civil hospitals were needed due to poor nutrition, Cholera and Malaria.

Once the civil medical department was separated from the military service, Colonial Surgeons were appointed to Central Province. This medical Board appointed vaccination officers who were responsible for vaccinating the public against smallpox.

In around 1861, an infectious disease hospital was established in Deiannewela (the smallpox hospital). This pauper hospital was later expanded to become the General Hospital Kandy. One of the first buildings of the Kandy Hospital was the Cholera ward, opened in 1866. It was located at the site of the current laundry in between the kitchen and the old KSM building.

== Academic facilities ==
Teaching Hospital Kandy has strong links to the University of Peradeniya, conducts undergraduate training programs for the university students studying at the Medicine and Postgraduate Institute of Medicine(PGIM) which is a national institute attached to the University of Colombo. PGIM appoints post-graduate trainees, registrars and senior registrars to this hospital on a regular basis and is one of the oldest Hospitals which provides the entire range of medical and surgical specialties under the administration of a single institution. Teaching Hospital Kandy is a training center for the student Nurses from the Nurses Training School in the hospital. It also provides teaching facilities for foreign Students who seek exposure on Tropical Diseases.

== Healthcare ==
Kandy Hospital is the second largest medical institution in the Island established and administered under the purview of the Ministry of Health Care and Nutrition, Sri Lanka, and is a tertiary care institution maintained by the Sri Lankan Government.

Teaching Hospital Kandy provides specialized health care services in 37 areas to the Central Province and to all other provinces except Western and Southern. People come from all other 7 provinces to seek expert care from Teaching Hospital Kandy.

=== Other services ===
The hospital has 78 Wards and 13 Special Units for inpatient services. It also has 10 Intensive Care Units (ICUs) and 24 Operating Theatres. Out-Patient Service, Specialized Clinic Service and an Emergency Treatment Units are also within the hospital. In addition, Chemical, Microbiological, Histological and Pathological Investigations, X Rays, USS, CT, MRI, Exercise ECG, Physiotherapy and Pharmacies services are available. The first heart transplant in Sri Lanka was carried out at this hospital while kidney transplants, liver transplants, neurosurgeries and many other surgeries are also performed.

== Location ==
Kandy hospital is situated close to Kandy railway Station along the William Gopallawa Mawatha from one side and along the Hanthana Road (Hospital Road) from the other side. This is one of the largest building complexes in Kandy.

== Professional associations ==
Office facilities for the Kandy Society of Medicine which conducts many academic and research activities is also situated within the hospital complex.
