= Deiannewela =

Deiannewela Deiyannewela
- suburb
- Location within Sri Lanka
- Coordinates: 7°17′N 80°38′E
- Country: Sri Lanka
- Province: Central Province
- District: Kandy District
- Divisional secretariat: Gagawata Korale Divisional Secretariat
- Time zone: UTC+5:30 (Sri Lanka Standard Time)
- Kandy Four Gravets and Gangawata Korale Divisional Secretariat

Deiannewela or Deiyannewela (Sinhala: දෙයියන්නේවෙල Tamil: தெய்யன்னவெல) is a Village Officer Domain (or GN Division) of Gangawata Korale Divisional Secretariat in Kandy District, Central Province, Sri Lanka. It is the location of a railway station and the National Hospital.

In 1934 the Kandy Municipal Council, constructed a number of model tenements in Deiyannewela, as part of its slum clearance programme. As the building of these tenements proceeded slums in other areas of Kandy were declared unfit for human habitation, those structures were destroyed and the occupants were rehoused in the new tenements. There were over 145 tenement buildings constructed, housing over one thousand unskilled and skilled labourers. The model tenements, along with those constructed at Katukelle and Mahaiyawa, were the first of their kind in the country. The program was sponsored and promoted by George E. de Silva, the Minister for Health and member of the State Council of Ceylon, representing Kandy.

== See also ==
- List of towns in Central Province, Sri Lanka
