= Bahirawakanda =

Bahirawakanda බහිරවකන්ද
- Village
- Location within Sri Lanka
- Coordinates: 7°17′47″N 80°38′6″E
- Country: Sri Lanka
- Province: Central Province
- District: Kandy District
- Time zone: UTC+5:30 (Sri Lanka Standard Time)

Bahirawakanda (Sinhala: බහිරවකන්ද) is a village in the centre of the Kandy, Sri Lanka. In Sinhala, Bahirawa Kanda translates to mountain of Bahirawa. According to Sri Lankan myths, Bahirawa is a sanguinary deity associated with earth and territory protection.

It is known for the Sri Maha Bodhi Viharaya, construction of which commenced in 1972, under the direction of Ven. Ampitiye Dammarama Thero. It was opened to the public on 1 January 1993, by President Ranasinghe Premadasa.

== See also ==
- List of towns in Central Province, Sri Lanka
