= Seethadevi Girls College =

Seethadevi Girls' College
- සීතාදේවි බාලිකා විද්‍යාලය

Location
- Kandy; Sri Lanka; 7°16′43″N 80°37′00″E

Information
- Motto: ණැන වඩමු - රට නගමු (Uplift Knowledge - Build Country)
- Established: 1980
- Founder: Pushparama Temple
- Principal: Mrs. Nilmini Amarasinghe
- Grades: Grade 1 - 13
- Gender: Girls
- Education system: National Education Curriculum of Ministry of Education (Sri Lanka)
- Colors: Green and White
- Website: www.seethadevi.sch.lk

Seethadevi Girls' College (Sinhala: සීතාදේවි බාලිකා විද්‍යාලය) is a girls' school in Kandy, Sri Lanka. M. D. Kamalawathi was the first principal of the girls' college. It is a provincial school funded by the central government providing primary and secondary education.

== History ==
Seethadevi Girls’ College was established on 18 January 1980 as a primary educational institution for girls with 18 girls at the Pushparama temple situated in Mulgampola in the Kandy district. The school was opened by the governor of the North Central Province, E.L. Senanayaka. After a few years E.L.Senanayaka donated his official residence as a school building. In the beginning, the school was open to 18 students. In 2018, the school had around 2400 students. Also, had a staff of 122 and a non-academic staff of 8.

Students currently study the National Education Curriculum of the Education Ministry in both Sinhala and English mediums. Education in the primary, secondary levels are carried out in mathematics, science, arts, languages and commerce sectors.

Under-16 Seethadevi Girls' College A team won the Sri Lanka Schools Hockey A division tournament in 2019.

== Past principals ==
Name of the principle	Took the office	Left the office
Mrs. M.D.K. Karunathissa	1980	1988
Miss. S. Rathnayaka	1988	1990
Mrs. A.G.D. Sumanasinghe	1990	1991
Mrs. H.K. Wijerathne	1991	2013
Mrs. Chandrakanthi Karunanayake	2013	2023
Mrs. Nilmini Amarasinghe	2023	Present

== Houses ==
- - SOMA DEVI
- - SAMUDRA DEVI
- - VIHARAMAHA DEVI
- - SUNETHRA DEVI

== Hockey ==
In 2019, the school's under 16 A team won the Sri Lankan Schools Hockey division A championship beating Holy Family Convent, Wennappuwa in a penalty shootout. Hesendi Ranmali of the school was awarded the best goal keeper's award. The school was the semifinalists and won the 3rd place of Sri Lanka Schools Hockey Association tournament in 2018.

In 2017, A and B teams of the school travel to India to compete in Sub junior National Hockey Championship and won against the home teams.

== See also ==
- Education in Sri Lanka
