= Hinagama =

Coordinates: 7°19′N 80°36′E

Hinagama Sinhala: හීණගම
- Village
- Interactive map of Hinagama
- Country: Sri Lanka
- Province: Central Province
- Time zone: UTC+5:30 (Sri Lanka Standard Time)

Hinagama (Sinhala: හීණගම, romanized: Heenagama) is a village in Sri Lanka. It is located within Central Province.

== See also ==
- List of towns in Central Province, Sri Lanka
