= Tennekumbura =

- Village
- Interactive map of Tennekumbura
- Country: Sri Lanka
- Province: Central Province
- Time zone: UTC+5:30 (Sri Lanka Standard Time)

Tennekumbura is a village in Sri Lanka. It is located within, Kandy District in Central Province.

== See also ==
- List of towns in Central Province, Sri Lanka
