= Watapuluwa =

Coordinates: 7°19′N 80°39′E

- Village
- Interactive map of Watapuluwa
- Country: Sri Lanka
- Province: Central Province
- Time zone: UTC+5:30 (Sri Lanka Standard Time)

Watapuluwa is a village in Sri Lanka. It is located within Central Province and situated in the county Gangawata Korale. The estimate terrain elevation above sea level is 434 metres.

The renowned Ambala Rajamaha Viharaya is located within the Watapuluwa Village.

== See also ==
- List of towns in Central Province, Sri Lanka
