= Udathalawinna =

Pallethalawinna පල්ලේතලවින්න
- Village
- Location within Sri Lanka
- Coordinates: 7.367°N 80.6167°E
- Country: Sri Lanka
- District: Kandy
- Elevation: 485.7632 m (1,593.711 ft)
- Time zone: UTC+5:30 (Sri Lanka Standard Time Zone)

Pallethalawinna is a village situated in the Kandy district of Sri Lanka, located north of Kandy city. This village is situated at an elevation of 495 meters above sea level, with an average temperature of 24 degrees Celsius. The annual rainfall in this area averages about 2500–3000 mm. The majority of the population here is Sinhalese, but there are also Muslims, Christians, and Tamils living in the village. The primary languages spoken in Pallethalawinna are Sinhala. The village has a population of approximately 55,366 people, with most of the children attending the local school, Rathanajothi Maha Vidyalaya.

The people in the village organize various cultural and sports functions that entertain the residents, including cricket matches held between sports clubs several times a year. The population of Pallethalawinna is steadily increasing, and improvements are being made to meet the desires and needs of the community. A stream flows through the village, attracting many visitors who use it for bathing and as a source of drinking water. Additionally, there is a railway station in the village that was built by the British government.

Pallethalawinna is renowned for Pallethalawinna Purana Bomalu Tampita Viharaya, a historical temple dating back to the era of King Dutugamunu.
