= Gurudeniya =

- Village
- Location within Sri Lanka
- Coordinates: 7°16′N 80°41′E
- Country: Sri Lanka
- Province: Central Province
- Time zone: UTC+5:30 (Sri Lanka Standard Time)

Gurudeniya is a village in Kandy, Sri Lanka. It is located within Central Province. It is known for the old brick bridge which was built in 1847 over the stream Thalathu oya.

== See also ==
- List of towns in Central Province, Sri Lanka
