= Pallegama (disambiguation) =

Pallegama is a village in Sri Lanka. Pallegama may also refer to the following villages in Sri Lanka

- Ankumbura Pallegama
- Atabage Pallegama
- Haputale Pallegama
- Migammana Pallegama
- Pallegama Ihalagammedda
- Pallegama Pahalagammedda
- Tembiligala Pallegama
- Udagama Pallegama
- Uduwela Pallegama
- Vilana Pallegama
- Yatihalagala Pallegama
