= Udagama (disambiguation) =

Udagama is a village in Sri Lanka. Udagama may also refer to the following Sri Lankan places or people

Villages

- Ankumbura Udagama
- Haputale Udagama
- Tembiligala Udagama
- Udagama, Eastern Province
- Udagama Pallegama
- Uduwela Udagama
- Vilana Udagama

Other

- Deepika Udagama, Sri Lankan lawyer
- Udagama Kanda, a mountain
