= Migammana (disambiguation) =

Migammana is a village in Sri Lanka. Migammana may also refer to the following villages in Sri Lanka:

- Migammana Ihalagammedda
- Migammana Mahagammedda
- Migammana Pallegama
