= Pahalagammedda (disambiguation) =

Pahalagammedda is a village in Sri Lanka. Pahalagammedda may also refer to the following villages in Sri Lanka

- Kengalla Pahalagammedda
- Pallegama Pahalagammedda
- Werapitiya Pahalagammedda
