= Vilana (disambiguation) =

Vilana is a white Greek wine grape variety. Vilana may also refer to

- Vilana Udagama, a village in Sri Lanka
- Vilana Pallegama, a village in Sri Lanka
- Vilana (surname)
