= Haputale (disambiguation) =

Haputale is a town in Sri Lanka. Haputale may also refer to the following villages in Sri Lanka

- Haputale Pallegama
- Haputale Udagama
