= Ihalagammedda =

Ihalagammedda may refer to the following villages in Sri Lanka

- Migammana Ihalagammedda
- Pallegama Ihalagammedda
