= Uduwela =

Uduwela may refer to the following villages in Sri Lanka

- Uduwela Pallegama
- Uduwela Udagama
