= Tembiligala =

Tembiligala may refer to the following villages in Sri Lanka

- Tembiligala Pallegama
- Tembiligala Udagama
