= Vilana (surname) =

Vilana is a Hispanic surname. Notable people with the surname include:

- Ramon de Vilana Perlas (1663–1741), Spanish nobleman
- Ricardo Vilana (born 1981), Brazilian footballer
