= Digahawatura =

Coordinates: 7°22′N 80°39′E

- Village
- Interactive map of Digahawatura
- Country: Sri Lanka
- Province: Central Province
- Time zone: UTC+5:30 (Sri Lanka Standard Time)

Digahawatura is a village in Sri Lanka. It is located within Central Province.

== Weather ==
=== Average temperature ===
| January | February | March | April | May | June | July | August | September | October | November | December |
|---|---|---|---|---|---|---|---|---|---|---|---|
| High: 19 °C | 20 °C | 21 °C | 22 °C | 21 °C | 18 °C | 18 °C | 18 °C | 18 °C | 19 °C | 19 °C | 19 °C |
| Low: 9 °C | 9 °C | 10 °C | 11 °C | 12 °C | 12 °C | 12 °C | 12 °C | 11 °C | 11 °C | 11 °C | 11 °C |

=== Precipitation ===
| January | February | March | April | May | June | July | August | September | October | November | December |
|---|---|---|---|---|---|---|---|---|---|---|---|
| 96mm | 60mm | 66mm | 135mm | 153mm | 153mm | 156mm | 135mm | 135mm | 186mm | 192mm | 153mm |

== See also ==
- List of towns in Central Province, Sri Lanka
