= Talagune =

Coordinates: 7°20′N 80°53′E

Talagune තලගුනේ
- Village
- Interactive map of Talagune
- Country: Sri Lanka
- Province: Central Province
- Time zone: UTC+5:30 (Sri Lanka Standard Time)

Talagune is a village in Sri Lanka. It is located in Central Province. The village has a nice view with surrounded mountains, Terraced paddy fields and a nice water fall named Allegala.

This village is famous for Dumbara Rata Hand Looms. Several families make this hand looms in a traditional way. They mainly target foreign markets to sell their items.

The main Livelihood of residents is farming. They farm rice and vegetables.

== Route ==
Thalagune is approximately 2 hours drive from Kandy and 6 hours drive from Colombo. Go 45 km on Kandy-Mahiyangana road towards to Mahiyangana. Turn left from Udadumbara town. Then go about 3 km on Udadumara-Kalugala road towards to Kalugala.

== See also ==
- List of towns in Central Province, Sri Lanka
