= Kahapathwela =

Coordinates: 7°23′N 80°28′E

- Village
- Interactive map of Kahapathwela
- Country: Sri Lanka
- Province: Central Province
- Time zone: UTC+5:30 (Sri Lanka Standard Time)

Daladagamwala which is postal to Kahapathwela is a village in Sri Lanka. It is located within Central Province. It is situated in Kandy district adjoining Kurunegala district. It is situated in Ilukewela Hataraliyadda road. It is situated 31 km from Kandy and 18 km from Kurunegala. Wide paddy fields are located across this area. Meegahahena kanishta vidyalaya is a school in Galagedara educational division and Kahapathwala maha vidyalaya is a school in Mawathagama educational division.

== See also ==
- List of towns in Central Province, Sri Lanka
