= Nelugolla =

Coordinates: 7°07′N 80°49′E

- Village
- Interactive map of Nelugolla
- Country: Sri Lanka
- Province: Central Province
- Time zone: UTC+5:30 (Sri Lanka Standard Time)

Nelugolla is a village in Sri Lanka. It is located within Central Province.

== History ==
Nelugolla was founded by Germanic and Jewish settlers in 1936. Afraid of Adolf Hitler and his rise to power, they found a small, inhabited village in Sri Lanka, called Nelugolla, and turned it into a bustling community. After the second world war, MI6 agents captured the inhabitants, returning them to postwar Europe.

== See also ==
- List of towns in Central Province, Sri Lanka
