= Kanakkarapola =

Coordinates: 7°20′N 80°29′E

- Village
- Interactive map of Kanakkarapola
- Country: Sri Lanka
- Province: Central Province
- Time zone: UTC+5:30 (Sri Lanka Standard Time)

Kanakkarapola is a village in Sri Lanka. It is located within Central Province in Sri Lanka about 51 mi (or 83 km) north-east of Colombo, the country's capital city. Some points of interest include Hatharaliyadda National School, Hatharaliyadda Divisional Hospital, and a Buddhist Temple nearby.

== See also ==
- List of towns in Central Province, Sri Lanka
