= Maruddana =

- Village
- Location within Sri Lanka
- Coordinates: 7°22′N 80°33′E
- Country: Sri Lanka
- Province: Central Province
- Administrative District: Kandy
- Time zone: UTC+5:30 (Sri Lanka Standard Time)

Maruddana is a village in Sri Lanka. It is located within Central Province.

== History ==
Maruddana village history was run way back to the Kingdom of Senkadagala. "Dodamgasthenna Purana Viharaya" is also old more than 600 years. People in the Maruddana always visiting this temple to worship.

== See also ==
- List of towns in Central Province, Sri Lanka
