= Yatimadura =

Coordinates: 7°05′N 80°56′E

- Village
- Interactive map of Yatimadura
- Country: Sri Lanka
- Province: Central Province

Government
  - Type: Mayor

Population
  - Total: 42
- Time zone: UTC+5:30 (Sri Lanka Standard Time)

Yatimadura is a village in Sri Lanka. It is located within Central Province. It is located amongst the paddy fields next to the Kuda Oya River.

In 2016, the population of Yatimadura was 42. The dominant religions are Buddhism and Hinduism.

== See also ==
- List of towns in Central Province, Sri Lanka
