= Tumpelawake =

Coordinates: 7°10′N 80°40′E

- Village
- Interactive map of Tumpelawake
- Country: Sri Lanka
- Province: Central Province
- Time zone: UTC+5:30 (Sri Lanka Standard Time)

Tumpelawake is a village in Sri Lanka located within the Central Province. The village is a preferred tourist destination famous for the places like 'Ramboda Falls', 'Royal Botanical Gardens, Peradeniya', 'Temple of the Tooth', and, 'Upper Kotmale Dam'.

== See also ==
- List of towns in Central Province, Sri Lanka
