= Madugalle =

Madugalle is a surname. Notable people with the surname include:

- Ranjan Madugalle (born 1959), Sri Lankan cricketer and referee

== See also ==
- Madugalla
