= Halangoda =

Coordinates: 7°26′N 80°37′E

- Village
- Interactive map of Halangoda
- Country: Sri Lanka
- Province: Central Province
- Time zone: UTC+5:30 (Sri Lanka Standard Time)

Halangoda is a village in Sri Lanka. It is located within Central Province. It is a small village with an estimated population of 1300 to date. The population has been steadily declining, and within the last 15 years has declined by an estimated 27%. It is a small and isolated village, and there is very little information available on the community.

== See also ==
- List of towns in Central Province, Sri Lanka
