= Makulussa Colony =

Coordinates: 7°33′N 80°37′E

- Village
- Interactive map of Makulussa Colony
- Country: Sri Lanka
- Province: Central Province
- Time zone: UTC+5:30 (Sri Lanka Standard Time)

Makulussa Colony is a village in Sri Lanka. It is located within Central Province (Sinhalese: මධ්‍යම පළාත Madhyama Palata, Tamil: மத்திய மாகாணம் Madhiya Maakaanam).

== See also ==
- List of towns in Central Province, Sri Lanka
