= Awulbodale =

Coordinates: 7°19′N 80°28′E

- Village
- Interactive map of Awulbodale
- Country: Sri Lanka
- Province: Central Province
- Time zone: UTC+5:30 (Sri Lanka Standard Time)

Awulbodale is a village in Sri Lanka, about 81 kilometres (50 mi) north-east of the capital Colombo. It is located within Central Province. Geographical coordinates: 7° 19' 0" North, 80° 28' 0" East

== See also ==
- List of towns in Central Province, Sri Lanka
