= Dadahogama =

Coordinates: 7°19′N 80°36′E

- Village
- Interactive map of Dadahogama
- Country: Sri Lanka
- Province: Central Province
- Time zone: UTC+5:30 (Sri Lanka Standard Time)

Dadahogama is a village in Sri Lanka. It is located within Central Province.

== Population ==
As of 2015, Dadahogama is home to around 190 residents. The male median age is 29.3 years, and the female median age is 31.7 years.

== See also ==
- List of towns in Central Province, Sri Lanka
