= Dandenikumbura =

Coordinates: 7°28′N 80°52′E

- Village
- Interactive map of Dandenikumbura
- Country: Sri Lanka
- Province: Central Province
- Time zone: UTC+5:30 (Sri Lanka Standard Time)

Dandenikumbura is a village in Sri Lanka. It is located within Central Province. Now in present only one man is living in this village. His name is Maharagedara Heenbanda he is a village Physician (වෙද මහතෙක්).

== See also ==
- List of towns in Central Province, Sri Lanka
