= Uguressapitiya =

Coordinates: 7°19′N 80°36′E

- Village
- Interactive map of Uguressapitiya
- Country: Sri Lanka
- Province: Central Province

Population (17 February 2011)
  - Total: 6,615
- Time zone: UTC+5:30 (Sri Lanka Standard Time)

Uguressapitiya is a village in Sri Lanka. It is located within Central Province. This is close to the second major city of Sri Lanka, Kandy.

== See also ==
- List of towns in Central Province, Sri Lanka
