= Medawala =

- Village
- Interactive map of Medawala
- Coordinates: 7°21′26″N 80°33′57″E
- Country: Sri Lanka
- Province: Central Province
- Time zone: UTC+5:30 (Sri Lanka Standard Time)

Medawala is a village in Sri Lanka. It is located within Central Province. It is a junction connecting of roads to Ranawana along Katugasthota, Hedeniya, Pujapitiya and Bokkawala.

== See also ==
- List of towns in Central Province, Sri Lanka
