= Dekinda =

- Village
- Location within Sri Lanka
- Coordinates: 7°1′N 80°31′E
- Country: Sri Lanka
- Province: Central Province
- Time zone: UTC+5:30 (Sri Lanka Standard Time)

Dekinda is a village in Sri Lanka. It is located within Central Province. This could be regarded as a village blessed with scenic beauty because there are beautiful waterfalls near the village, one of them being Galboda Ella.

== See also ==
- List of towns in Central Province, Sri Lanka
