= Mediriya =

Coordinates: 7°18′N 80°53′E

- Village
- Interactive map of Mediriya
- Country: Sri Lanka
- Province: Central Province
- Time zone: UTC+5:30 (Sri Lanka Standard Time)

Mediriya is a village in Sri Lanka. It is located within Central Province. The Latitude is 7° 17' 59" N and the Longitude is 80° 52' 59" E. It has a tropical rainforest climate.

== See also ==
- List of towns in Central Province, Sri Lanka
