= Bodikotuwa =

Coordinates: 7°30′N 80°43′E

- Village
- Interactive map of Bodikotuwa
- Country: Sri Lanka
- Province: Central Province
- Time zone: UTC+5:30 (Sri Lanka Standard Time)

Bodikotuwa is a village in Sri Lanka. It is located within Central Province. It is best known for its hiking trails due to its landscape, maximum elevation is 1.4 miles.

== See also ==
- List of towns in Central Province, Sri Lanka
