= Rambawela =

- Village
- Interactive map of Rambawela
- Coordinates: 7°50′00″N 80°34′00″E
- Country: Sri Lanka
- Province: Central Province
- Time zone: UTC+5:30 (Sri Lanka Standard Time)

Rambawela is a village in Sri Lanka. It is located within the Central Province. It is located 128 km (79 mi) northeast of Colombo, Sri Lanka's capital.

== See also ==
- List of towns in Central Province, Sri Lanka
