= Madawala Ulpota =

Coordinates: 7°37′N 80°37′E

- Village
- Interactive map of Madawala Ulpota
- Country: Sri Lanka
- Province: Central Province
- Time zone: UTC+5:30 (Sri Lanka Standard Time)

Madawala Ulpota is a village in Sri Lanka. It is located within Central Province at 7° 37' 0" North, 80° 38' 0" East.

== See also ==
- List of towns in Central Province, Sri Lanka
