= Malagammana =

Coordinates: 7°19′N 80°35′E

- Village
- Interactive map of Malagammana
- Country: Sri Lanka
- Province: Central Province

Population (2012)
  - Total: 451
- Time zone: UTC+5:30 (Sri Lanka Standard Time)

Malagammana is a village in Sri Lanka, located within the Central Province. As of the 2012 census, it had a population of 451.

== See also ==
- List of towns in Central Province, Sri Lanka
