= Nikagolla =

Nikagolla Galahamam
- Village
- Interactive map of Nikagolla
- Country: Sri Lanka
- Province: Central Province
  - Density: 3,100/sq mi (1,200/km^{2})
- Time zone: UTC+5:30 (Sri Lanka Standard Time)
- Postal code: 21056

Nikagolla is a village in Sri Lanka. It is located within Central Province.

== See also ==
- List of towns in Central Province, Sri Lanka
