= Ratninda =

- Village
- Interactive map of Ratninda
- Coordinates: 7°30′15″N 80°34′54″E
- Country: Sri Lanka
- Province: Central Province
- Elevation: 2,070 ft (631 m)
- Time zone: UTC+5:30 (Sri Lanka Standard Time)

Ratninda is a village in Sri Lanka. It is located within Central Province.

== See also ==
- List of towns in Central Province, Sri Lanka
