= Kirlulgama =

- Village
- Location within Sri Lanka
- Coordinates: 7°33′N 80°38′E
- Country: Sri Lanka
- Province: Central Province
- Elevation: 1,617 ft (493 m)
- Time zone: UTC+5:30 (Sri Lanka Standard Time)

Kirlulgama is a village in Sri Lanka. It is located within Central Province.

== See also ==
- List of towns in Central Province, Sri Lanka
