= Mahalakotuwa =

- Village
- Interactive map of Mahalakotuwa
- Country: Sri Lanka
- Province: Central Province
- Time zone: UTC+5:30 (Sri Lanka Standard Time)

Mahalakotuwa is a village in Sri Lanka. It is located within Central Province. The village was the site of a 2010 internet-access project designating it as an "eVillage".

== See also ==
- List of towns in Central Province, Sri Lanka
