= Ududeniya Sinhalagama =

Coordinates: 7°12′N 80°45′E

- Village
- Interactive map of Ududeniya Sinhalagama
- Country: Sri Lanka
- Province: Central Province
- Time zone: UTC+5:30 (Sri Lanka Standard Time)

Ududeniya Sinhalagama is a village in Central Province, Sri Lanka.

== See also ==
- List of towns in Central Province, Sri Lanka
