= Dombawela =

- Village
- Interactive map of Dombawela
- Country: Sri Lanka
- Province: Central Province
- Elevation: 1,430 ft (436 m)
- Time zone: UTC+5:30 (Sri Lanka Standard Time)

Dombawela is a village in Sri Lanka. It is located within Central Province and has an elevation of 436 m (1,430 ft).

== See also ==
- List of towns in Central Province, Sri Lanka
