= Weliwita Pahalagama =

Coordinates: 7°19′N 80°30′E

- Village
- Interactive map of Weliwita Pahalagama
- Country: Sri Lanka
- Province: Central Province
- Time zone: UTC+5:30 (Sri Lanka Standard Time)

Weliwita Pahalagama is a village in Sri Lanka. It is located within Central Province.

== See also ==
- List of towns in Central Province, Sri Lanka
