= Uda Talawinnamadige =

- Village
- Location in Sri Lanka
- Coordinates: 7°20′30″N 80°39′05″E
- Country: Sri Lanka
- Province: Central Province
- Time zone: UTC+5:30 (Sri Lanka Standard Time)

Uda Talawinnamadige is a village in Sri Lanka. It is located within Central Province.

== See also ==
- List of towns in Central Province, Sri Lanka
