= Millawana Ihalagama =

Coordinates: 7°39′N 80°34′E

- Village
- Interactive map of Millawana Ihalagama
- Country: Sri Lanka
- Province: Central Province
- Time zone: UTC+5:30 (Sri Lanka Standard Time)

Millawana Ihalagama is a village in Sri Lanka. It is located within Central Province.

== See also ==
- List of towns in Central Province, Sri Lanka
