= Palle Hapuwida =

- Village
- Interactive map of Palle Hapuwida
- Coordinates: 7°26′N 80°40′E
- Country: Sri Lanka
- Province: Central Province
- Time zone: UTC+5:30 (Sri Lanka Standard Time)

Palle Hapuwida is a village in central Sri Lanka. It is located within Central Province.

== See also ==
- List of towns in Central Province, Sri Lanka
