= Nawayalatenna =

Coordinates: 7°20′N 80°38′E

- Village
- Interactive map of Nawayalatenna
- Country: Sri Lanka
- Province: Central Province
- Time zone: UTC+5:30 (Sri Lanka Standard Time)

Nawayalatenna is a village in Sri Lanka. It is located within Central Province.

== See also ==
- List of towns in Central Province, Sri Lanka
