= Polpitiya =

- Village
- Interactive map of Polpitiya
- Coordinates: 6°58′35″N 80°27′02″E
- Country: Sri Lanka
- Province: Central Province
- Time zone: UTC+5:30 (Sri Lanka Standard Time)

Polpitiya is a village in Sri Lanka. It is located within Central Province.

== See also ==
- List of towns in Central Province, Sri Lanka
