= Uduwa =

- Village
- Interactive map of Uduwa
- Coordinates: 7°21′35″N 80°29′16″E
- Country: Sri Lanka
- Province: Central Province
- Time zone: UTC+5:30 (Sri Lanka Standard Time)

Uduwa is a small village located in Sri Lanka. It is located within Central Province.

== See also ==
- List of towns in Central Province, Sri Lanka
