= Hatiyalwela =

Coordinates: 7°18′N 80°49′E

- Village
- Interactive map of Hatiyalwela
- Country: Sri Lanka
- Province: Central Province
- Time zone: UTC+5:30 (Sri Lanka Standard Time)

Hatiyalwela is a village in the Central Province of Sri Lanka.

== See also ==
- List of towns in Central Province, Sri Lanka
