= Narangolla =

- Village
- Interactive map of Narangolla
- Coordinates: 7°32′04″N 80°41′06″E
- Country: Sri Lanka
- Province: Central Province
- Time zone: UTC+5:30 (Sri Lanka Standard Time)

Narangolla is a village in Sri Lanka. It is located within Central Province.

== See also ==
- List of towns in Central Province, Sri Lanka
