= Nagolla, Central Province =

Nagolla
- Village
- Interactive map of Nagolla
- Country: Sri Lanka
- Province: Central Province
- Time zone: UTC+5:30 (Sri Lanka Standard Time)

The Nagolla located at 7°22′N 80°52′E is a village in the Central Province of Sri Lanka.

== See also ==
- List of towns in Central Province, Sri Lanka
