= Tawalantenna =

- Village
- Interactive map of Tawalantenna
- Coordinates: 7°13′N 80°47′E
- Country: Sri Lanka
- Province: Central Province
- Time zone: UTC+5:30 (Sri Lanka Standard Time)

Tawalantenna is a village in Central Province, Sri Lanka.

== See also ==
- List of towns in Central Province, Sri Lanka
