= Wellatota =

- Village
- Country: Sri Lanka
- Province: Central Province
- Time zone: UTC+5:30 (Sri Lanka Standard Time)

Wellatota is a village in Sri Lanka. It is located within Central Province. Wellatota is approximately 113 kilometers away from the Sri Lankan Capital, Colombo.

== See also ==
- List of towns in Central Province, Sri Lanka
