= Elpitiya, Central Province =

Elpitiya
- Town
- Country: Sri Lanka
- Province: Southern Province, Sri Lanka
- Time zone: UTC+5:30 (Sri Lanka Standard Time)
- Postal code: 80400

Elpitiya is a village in Sri Lanka. It is located within Southern province.

== See also ==
- List of towns in Central Province, Sri Lanka
