= Hitigegama =

Coordinates: 6°57′N 80°27′E

- Village
- Interactive map of Hitigegama
- Country: Sri Lanka
- Province: Central Province
- Time zone: UTC+5:30 (Sri Lanka Standard Time)

Hitigegama is a village located in Central Province, Sri Lanka.

== See also ==
- List of towns in Central Province, Sri Lanka
