= Jahakagama =

Coordinates: 7°42′N 80°35′E

- Village
- Interactive map of Jahakagama
- Country: Sri Lanka
- Province: Central Province
- Time zone: UTC+5:30 (Sri Lanka Standard Time)

Jahakagama is a village in the Central Province of Sri Lanka.

== See also ==
- List of towns in Central Province, Sri Lanka
