= Pannala II =

Coordinates: 7°09′N 80°52′E

- Village
- Interactive map of Pannala II
- Country: Sri Lanka
- Province: Central Province
- Time zone: UTC+5:30 (Sri Lanka Standard Time)

Pannala II is a village located within Central Province, Sri Lanka.

== See also ==
- List of towns in Central Province, Sri Lanka
