= Loolkade =

Coordinates: 7°38′N 80°33′E

- Village
- Interactive map of Loolkade
- Country: Sri Lanka
- Province: Central Province
- Time zone: UTC+5:30 (Sri Lanka Standard Time)

Loolkade is a village in Central Province, Sri Lanka.

== See also ==
- List of towns in Central Province, Sri Lanka
