= Batagolla =

- Village
- Interactive map of Batagolla
- Country: Sri Lanka
- Province: Central Province
- Time zone: UTC+5:30 (Sri Lanka Standard Time)

Batagolla is a village in Sri Lanka. It is located within Central Province. It is where people made groups against British

== See also ==
- List of towns in Central Province, Sri Lanka
