= Ginnoruwa =

Coordinates: 7°30′N 80°59′E

- Village
- Interactive map of Ginnoruwa
- Country: Sri Lanka
- Province: Uva Province
- Time zone: UTC+5:30 (Sri Lanka Standard Time)

Ginnoruwa is a village in Sri Lanka. It is located within Uva Province.
