= Mawatupola =

- Village
- Country: Sri Lanka
- Province: Central Province
- Time zone: UTC+5:30 (Sri Lanka Standard Time)

Mawatupola is a village in Sri Lanka. It is located within the Central Province.

== See also ==
- List of towns in Central Province, Sri Lanka
