= Dambarawa =

- Village
- Interactive map of Dambarawa
- Country: Sri Lanka
- Province: Central Province
- Time zone: UTC+5:30 (Sri Lanka Standard Time)

Dambarawa is a village in Central Province, Sri Lanka.
