= Yaggala =

- Village
- Country: Sri Lanka
- Province: Central Province

Yaggala is a village in Sri Lanka. It is located within Central Province.

== See also ==
- List of settlements in Central Province (Sri Lanka)
